= List of ambassadors of the United States to the World Trade Organization =

United States diplomatic position

Deputy United States Trade Representative and Chief of Mission for the Permanent Mission of the United States to the World Trade Organization

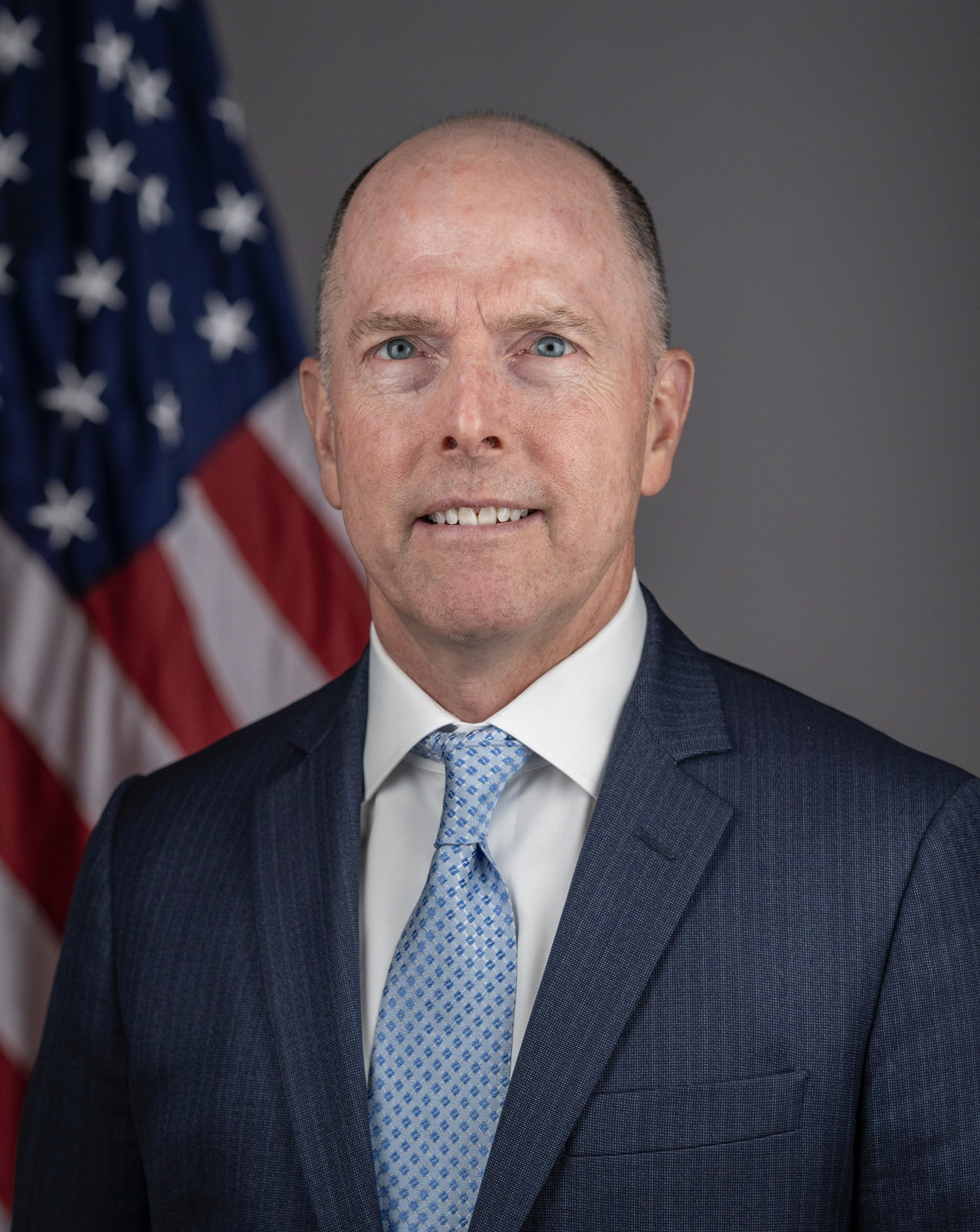
- Incumbent; Joseph Barloon since October 14, 2025
- Reports to: United States Trade Representative
- Residence: Geneva, Switzerland
- Appointer: President of the United States
- Term length: No fixed term; At the pleasure of the president of the United States
- Inaugural holder: Booth Gardner
- Website: U.S. Mission to the World Trade Organization

The following is a list of U.S. ambassadors to the World Trade Organization. The formal title is Chief of Mission for the Permanent Mission of the United States to the WTO with the rank of Ambassador during tenure of service. Historically, one of the Deputy United States Trade Representatives has served as the U.S. ambassador to the WTO.

== List of U.S. Ambassadors to the WTO ==
Ambassador	Image	Assumed office	Left office
Booth Gardner		1995	1997
Rita Derrick Hayes		November 1997	August 2001
Linnet F. Deily		2001	2005
Peter F. Allgeier		October 5, 2005	August 2009
Michael Punke		March 2010	December 2016
Dennis C. Shea		March 13, 2018	December 2020
María Pagán		March 14, 2022	January 20, 2025
Joseph Barloon		October 14, 2025	present
