= Ambassadors of the United States =

United States diplomatic position

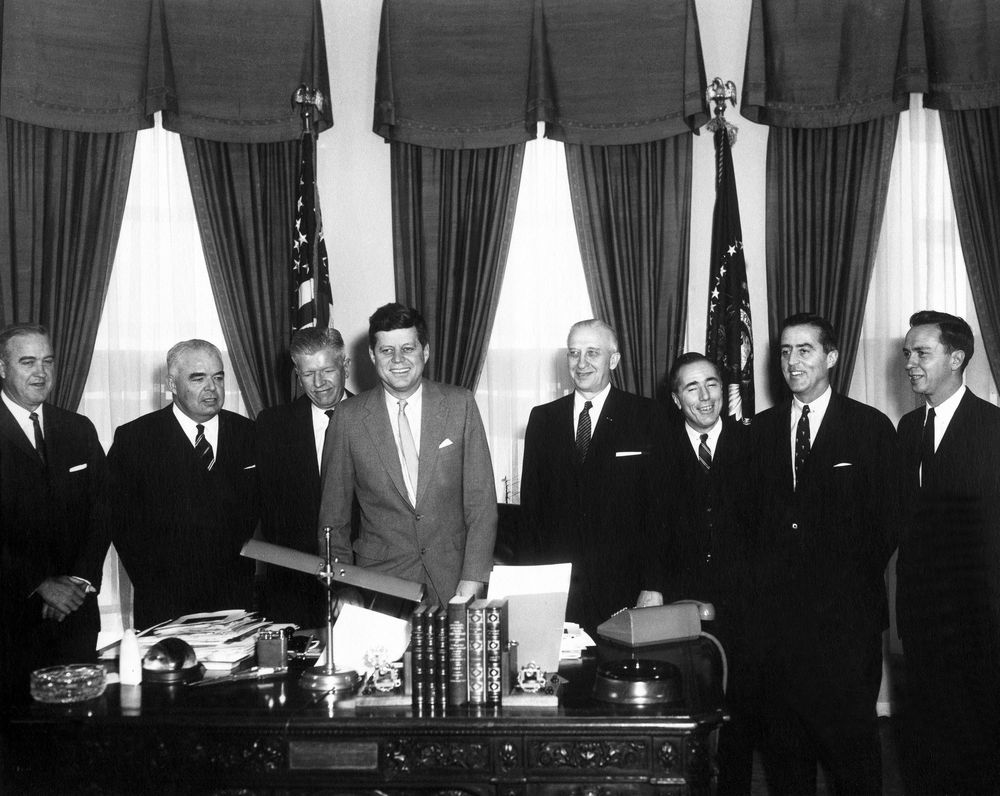
President John F. Kennedy with a group of ambassadors in March 1961

Ambassadors of the United States are persons nominated by the president to serve as the United States' diplomatic representatives to foreign nations, international organizations, and as ambassadors-at-large. Under Article II, Section 2 of the U.S. Constitution, their appointment must be confirmed by the United States Senate; while an ambassador may be appointed during a recess, they can serve only until the end of the next session of Congress, unless subsequently confirmed.

Ambassadors are the highest-ranking diplomats of the U.S. and are usually based at the embassy in the host country. They are under the jurisdiction of the Department of State and answer directly to the secretary of state; however, ambassadors serve "at the pleasure of the President", meaning they can be dismissed at any time. Appointments change regularly for various reasons, such as reassignment or retirement.

An ambassador may be a career Foreign Service officer (career diplomat – CD) or a political appointee (PA). In most cases, career foreign service officers serve a tour of approximately three years per ambassadorship, whereas political appointees customarily tender their resignations upon the inauguration of a new president. From 1974 to 2025, between 57% and 74% of ambassadors were career diplomats.

The State Department publishes a monthly list of ambassadors. A listing by country of past chiefs of mission is maintained by the Office of the Historian of the U.S. Department of State, along with the names and appointment dates of past and present ambassadors-at-large and mission to international organizations.

== Current U.S. ambassadors ==
Note that the information in this list is subject to change due to regular personnel changes resulting from retirements and reassignments. The State Department posts updated lists of ambassadors approximately monthly, accessible via an interactive menu-based website.

Host country	List	Ambassador	Background	Embassy and website	Position established	Confirmed
Afghanistan (Note: The U.S. Embassy in Kabul transferred operations to Doha, Qatar, on August 31, 2021, following the fall of Kabul to the Taliban. Since December 31, 2021, the U.S. Interests Section at the Embassy of Qatar in Kabul has served as the protecting power for the U.S. in Afghanistan.)	List	Vacant since January 6, 2020; Don Brown, chargé d'affaires a.i.	(N/A)	Kabul Homepage	1921	
Albania	List	Eric Wendt	PA	Tirana	1922	August 7, 2026
Algeria	List	Vacant since January 16, 2026; Mark A. Schapiro, Chargé d'affaires a.i	(N/A)	Algiers	1962	
Andorra (Note: One ambassador, resident at Madrid, is accredited to Andorra and Spain.)	List	Benjamin Leon	PA	Madrid	1998	December 18, 2025
Angola (Note: One ambassador, resident at Luanda, is accredited to Angola and São Tomé and Príncipe.)	List	Vacant since October 2024; Shannon Nagy Cazeau, chargé d'affaires a.i.	(N/A)	Luanda	1994	
Antigua and Barbuda (Note: One ambassador, resident at Bridgetown, is accredited to Antigua and Barbuda, Barbados, Dominica, Grenada, Saint Kitts and Nevis, Saint Lucia, and Saint Vincent and the Grenadines.)	List	Vacant since January 20, 2025; Karin B. Sullivan, chargé d'affaires a.i.	(N/A)	Bridgetown	1981	
Argentina	List	Peter Lamelas	PA	Buenos Aires	1823	September 18, 2025
Armenia	List	Vacant since January 16, 2026; David Allen, Chargé d'affaires a.i.	(N/A)	Yerevan Homepage	1993	
Australia	List	Dave Brat	PA	Canberra Homepage	1940	August 7, 2026
Austria	List	Arthur Fisher	PA	Vienna Homepage	1838	October 7, 2025
Azerbaijan	List	Vacant since January 18, 2025; Amy Carlon, chargé d'affaires a.i.	(N/A)	Baku	1992	
Bahamas	List	Herschel Walker	PA	Nassau	1973	October 7, 2025
Bahrain	List	Stephanie Hallett	CD	Manama Homepage	1971	October 7, 2025
Bangladesh	List	Brent T. Christensen	CD	Dhaka Homepage	1974	December 18, 2025
Barbados	List	Vacant since January 20, 2025; Karin B. Sullivan, chargé d'affaires a.i.	(N/A)	Bridgetown	1966	
Belarus	List	Vacant since June 9, 2022; Michael Kreidler, chargé d'affaires a.i.	(N/A)	Minsk	1992	
Belgium	List	Bill White	PA	Brussels Homepage	1832	October 7, 2025
Belize	List	André Bauer	PA	Belmopan	1981	August 7, 2026
Benin	List	Peter Lord	CD	Cotonou	1960	September 30, 2026
Bhutan	The United States does not maintain formal diplomatic relations with Bhutan. Informal contact is maintained through the U.S. Embassy in New Delhi.					
Bolivia	List	Vacant since September 15, 2008; Amanda Porter, chargé d'affaires a.i.	(N/A)	La Paz	1849	
Bosnia and Herzegovina	List	Vacant since February 15, 2025; John Ginkel, chargé d'affaires a.i.	(N/A)	Sarajevo Homepage	1993	
Botswana	List	Vacant since August 26, 2026; Christopher J. Gunning, chargé d'affaires a.i.	(N/A)	Gaborone	1966	
Brazil	List	Daniel Perez	PA	Brasília	1825	August 7, 2026
Brunei	List	Vacant since June 30, 2026; Laura Brown, chargé d'affaires a.i.	(N/A)	Bandar Seri Begawan	1984	
Bulgaria	List	Vacant since January 29, 2025; H. Martin McDowell, chargé d'affaires a.i.	(N/A)	Sofia	1901	
Burkina Faso	List	Joann M. Lockard	CD	Ouagadougou	1960	May 2, 2024
Burma (Myanmar) (Note: In 1989 the military government of Burma changed the name of the nation to Myanmar, but the United States government and other Western governments still refer to the country as Burma in official usage.)	List	Vacant since December 17, 2022; Douglas Sonnek, chargé d'affaires a.i.	(N/A)	Yangon Homepage	1947	
Burundi	List	Vacant since January 18, 2026; Tim Sikes, Chargé d'affaires a.i.	(N/A)	Bujumbura	1962	
Cabo Verde (Cape Verde)	List	Nutan Patel	PA	Praia	1976	September 30, 2026
Cambodia	List	Christopher J. Anderson	PA	Phnom Penh Homepage	1950	August 7, 2026
Cameroon	List	Vacant since January 17, 2026; John G. Robinson, Chargé d'affaires a.i.	(N/A)	Yaoundé	1960	
Canada	List	Pete Hoekstra	PA	Ottawa Homepage	1927	April 9, 2025
Central African Republic	List	Vacant since March 27, 2025; Melanie Anne Zimmerman, chargé d'affaires a.i.	(N/A)	Bangui	1960	
Chad	List	Vacant since February 28, 2025; William Flens, chargé d'affaires a.i.	(N/A)	N'Djamena	1961	
Chile	List	Brandon Judd	PA	Santiago	1824	October 7, 2025
China	List	David Perdue	PA	Beijing Homepage	1844	April 29, 2025
Colombia	List	Vacant since June 1, 2022; Hugo Guevara, chargé d'affaires a.i.	N/A	Bogotá	1823	
Comoros (Note: One ambassador, resident at Antananarivo, is accredited to Madagascar and Comoros.)	List	Vacant since January 29, 2026; Tom Bevan, Chargé d'affaires a.i.	N/A	Antananarivo	1977	
Republic of the Congo	List	Vacant since July 10, 2025; Amanda S. Jacobsen, chargé d'affaires a.i.	N/A	Brazzaville	1960	
Democratic Republic of the Congo	List	Vacant since December 31, 2025; Ian J. McCary, chargé d'affaires a.i.	N/A	Kinshasa	1960	
Costa Rica	List	Melinda Hildebrand	PA	San José	1853	October 7, 2025
Croatia	List	Nicole McGraw	PA	Zagreb	1992	October 7, 2025
Cuba	List	Vacant since October 28, 1960; Mike Hammer, chargé d'affaires a.i.	(N/A)	Havana Homepage	1902	
Cyprus	List	John Breslow	PA	Nicosia	1960	August 7, 2026
Czech Republic	List	Nicholas Merrick	PA	Prague Homepage	1992	October 7, 2025
Denmark	List	Ken Howery	PA	Copenhagen Homepage	1827	October 7, 2025
Djibouti	List	Cynthia Kierscht	CD	Djibouti City	1980	May 2, 2024
Dominica	List	Vacant since January 20, 2025; Karin B. Sullivan, chargé d'affaires a.i.	(N/A)	Bridgetown	1979	
Dominican Republic	List	Leah Campos	PA	Santo Domingo	1884	October 7, 2025
East Timor (Timor-Leste)	List	Vacant since February 24, 2025; Bruce Begnell, chargé d'affaires a.i.	(N/A)	Dili	2002	
Ecuador	List	Vacant since April 17, 2025; Lawrence Petroni, chargé d'affaires a.i.	(N/A)	Quito	1833	
Egypt	List	Vacant since January 17, 2026; Robert Silverman, Chargé d'affaires a.i.	(N/A)	Cairo	1848	
El Salvador	List	Vacant since July 31, 2025; Naomi Fellows, chargé d'affaires a.i.	(N/A)	San Salvador Homepage	1863	
Equatorial Guinea	List	Stanley L. Brown	CD	Malabo	1967	August 7, 2026
Eritrea	List	Vacant since July 19, 2010; Christine E. Meyer, chargé d'affaires a.i.	(N/A)	Asmara	1991	
Estonia	List	Roman Pipko	PA	Tallinn Homepage	1922	October 7, 2025
Eswatini	List	Vacant since December 20, 2022; Marc Weinstock, chargé d'affaires a.i.	(N/A)	Mbabane	1971	
Ethiopia	List	Ervin Jose Massinga	CD	Addis Ababa	1908	July 27, 2023
Fiji (Note: One ambassador, resident at Suva, is accredited to Fiji, Kiribati, Nauru, Tonga, and Tuvalu.)	List	Vacant since January 16, 2026; Christina Cavallo, Chargé d'affaires a.i.	(N/A)	Suva	1971	
Finland	List	Howard Brodie	PA	Helsinki	1920	October 7, 2025
France (Note: One ambassador, resident at Paris, is accredited to France and Monaco.)	List	Charles Kushner	PA	Paris Homepage	1778	May 19, 2025
Gabon	List	Keith Heffern	CD	Libreville	1960	September 30, 2026
The Gambia	List	Laurence Socha	CD	Banjul	1965	August 7, 2026
Georgia	List	Vacant since July 15, 2025; Courtney Austrian, chargé d'affaires a.i.	(N/A)	Tbilisi	1992	
Germany	List	Vacant since July 13, 2024; Alan Meltzer, chargé d'affaires a.i.	(N/A)	Berlin Homepage	1797	
Ghana	List	Vacant since May 28, 2025; Rolf Olson, chargé d'affaires a.i.	(N/A)	Accra Homepage	1957	
Greece	List	Vacant since October 13, 2026; Josh Huck, chargé d'affaires a.i.	(N/A)	Athens Homepage	1868	
Grenada	List	Vacant since January 20, 2025; Karin B. Sullivan, chargé d'affaires a.i.	(N/A)	Bridgetown	1975	
Guatemala	List	Vacant since January 17, 2026; Jorgan K. Andrews, Chargé d'affaires a.i.	(N/A)	Guatemala City	1826	
Guinea-Bissau (Note: One ambassador, resident at Dakar, is accredited to Guinea-Bissau and Senegal.)	List	Vacant since January 15, 2026; Jennifer Davis-Paguada, Chargé d'affaires a.i.	(N/A)	Dakar	1976	
Guinea	List	Vacant since January 20, 2025; Tiffany McGriff, chargé d'affaires a.i.	(N/A)	Conakry	1959	
Guyana	List	Nicole D. Theriot	CD	Georgetown	1966	July 27, 2023
Haiti	List	Vacant since June 11, 2025	(N/A)	Port-au-Prince	1862	
Holy See (Vatican City)	List	Brian Burch	PA	Vatican City Homepage	1984	August 2, 2025
Honduras	List	Vacant since April 18, 2025; Colleen A. Hoey, chargé d'affaires a.i.	(N/A)	Tegucigalpa	1853	
Hungary	List	Vacant since January 13, 2025; Caroline Savage, chargé d'affaires a.i.	(N/A)	Budapest	1921	
Iceland	List	Billy Long	PA	Reykjavík	1941	May 18, 2026
India	List	Sergio Gor	PA	New Delhi Homepage	1947	October 7, 2025
Indonesia	List	Vacant since April 30, 2025; Joy M. Sakurai, chargé d'affaires a.i.	(N/A)	Jakarta Homepage	1949	
Iran	List	No diplomatic relations since April 7, 1980. Informal contact via the U.S. Interests Section in the Swiss embassy. Virtual Embassy Tehran open since December 2011.				
Iraq	List	Vacant since December 7, 2024; Steven Fagin, Chargé d'affaires a.i.	(N/A)	Baghdad Homepage	1931	
Ireland	List	Edward Walsh	PA	Dublin Homepage	1927	June 4, 2025
Israel	List	Mike Huckabee	PA	Jerusalem Homepage	1949	April 9, 2025
Italy (Note: One ambassador, resident at Rome, is accredited to Italy and San Marino.)	List	Tilman Fertitta	PA	Rome Homepage	1831	April 29, 2025
Ivory Coast	List	Vacant since January 16, 2026; Junaid "Jay" Munir, Chargé d'affaires a.i.	(N/A)	Abidjan	1960	
Jamaica	List	Vacant since January 20, 2025; Scott Renner, chargé d'affaires a.i.	(N/A)	Kingston	1962	
Japan	List	George Edward Glass	PA	Tokyo Homepage	1859	April 8, 2025
Jordan	List	James Holtsnider	CD	Amman	1950	October 7, 2025
Kazakhstan	List	Julie Stufft	CD	Astana	1992	October 7, 2025
Kenya	List	Henry T. Wooster	CD	Nairobi Homepage	1964	September 30, 2026
Kiribati	List	Vacant since January 16, 2026; Christina Cavallo, Chargé d'affaires a.i.	(N/A)	Suva	1980	
Kosovo	List	Vacant since December 30, 2024; Anu Prattipati, Chargé d'affaires a.i.	(N/A)	Pristina	2008	
Kuwait	List	Vacant since July 9, 2025; Steven R. Butler, Chargé d'affaires a.i.	(N/A)	Kuwait City	1961	
Kyrgyzstan	List	Steven Gillen	CD	Bishkek	1992	September 30, 2026
Laos	List	Vacant since January 16, 2026; Michelle Y. Outlaw, Chargé d'affaires a.i.	(N/A)	Vientiane	1950	
Latvia	List	Melissa Argyros	PA	Riga	1922	December 18, 2025
Lebanon	List	Michel Issa	PA	Beirut Homepage	1942	October 7, 2025
Lesotho	List	Vacant since April 12, 2024; Thomas Hines, chargé d'affaires a.i.	(N/A)	Maseru	1966	
Liberia	List	Vacant since August 4, 2025; Kristin Gilmore, chargé d'affaires a.i.	(N/A)	Monrovia	1863	
Libya (Note: The U.S. Embassy in Tripoli suspended operations in 2014. Diplomatic personnel operate from the U.S. Embassy in Tunis, Tunisia.)	List	Vacant since September 8, 2022; Inga Heemink, chargé d'affaires a.i.	(N/A)	Tripoli	1952	
Liechtenstein (Note: One ambassador, resident at Bern, is accredited to Switzerland and Liechtenstein.)	List	Callista Gingrich	PA	Bern	1853	September 18, 2025
Lithuania	List	Kara McDonald	CD	Vilnius	1922	November 29, 2023
Luxembourg	List	Stacey Feinberg	PA	Luxembourg Luxembourg City	1903	October 7, 2025
Madagascar	List	Vacant since January 29, 2026; Tom Bevan, Chargé d'affaires a.i.	(N/A)	Antananarivo	1960	
Malawi	List	John McIntyre	CD	Lilongwe	1964	September 30, 2026
Malaysia	List	Joshua Harris	CD	Kuala Lumpur	1957	September 30, 2026
Maldives	List	Vacant since December 10, 2025; Dave Williams, chargé d'affaires a.i.	(N/A)	Malé	2023	
Mali	List	Vacant since September 5, 2026; Wallace R. Bain, chargé d'affaires a.i.	(N/A)	Bamako	1960	
Malta	List	Somers Farkas	PA	Attard Homepage	1964	October 7, 2025
Marshall Islands	List	Vacant since January 12, 2026; Gregory D'Alesandro, chargé d'affaires a.i.	(N/A)	Majuro	1986	
Mauritania	List	Vacant since July 9, 2024; Corina R. Sanders, chargé d'affaires a.i.	(N/A)	Nouakchott	1960	
Mauritius (Note: One ambassador, resident at Port Louis, is accredited to Mauritius and Seychelles.)	List	Vacant since January 16, 2026; Craig Halbmaier, Chargé d'affaires a.i.	(N/A)	Port Louis	1968	
Mexico	List	Ronald D. Johnson	PA	Mexico City Homepage	1825	April 9, 2025
Micronesia	List	Vacant since June 9, 2026; Andrew Wylie, Chargé d'affaires a.i.	(N/A)	Kolonia	1987	
Moldova	List	Mark Burkhalter	PA	Chișinău	1992	August 7, 2026
Monaco	List	Charles Kushner	PA	Paris Homepage	2006	May 19, 2025
Mongolia	List	Richard Buangan	CD	Ulaanbaatar	1988	August 4, 2022
Montenegro	List	Vacant since January 16, 2026; Michael C. Keays, Chargé d'affaires a.i.	(N/A)	Podgorica	1905	
Morocco	List	Duke Buchan	PA	Rabat	1905	October 7, 2025
Mozambique	List	Vacant since May 29, 2025; Abigail L. Dressel, chargé d'affaires a.i.	(N/A)	Maputo	1976	
Namibia	List	John Giordano	PA	Windhoek	1990	October 7, 2025
Nauru	List	Vacant since January 16, 2026; Christina Cavallo, Chargé d'affaires a.i.	(N/A)	Suva	1974	
Nepal	List	Vacant since January 16, 2026; Megan Bouldin, chargé d'affaires	(N/A)	Kathmandu	1959	
Netherlands	List	Joseph Popolo Jr.	PA	The Hague Homepage	1781	October 7, 2025
New Zealand (Note: One ambassador, resident at Wellington, is accredited to New Zealand and Samoa.)	List	Jared Novelly	PA	Wellington	1942	May 18, 2026
Nicaragua	List	Natasha Franceschi	CD	Managua	1851	September 30, 2026
Niger	List	Vacant since January 16, 2026; Colleen Crenwelge, Chargé d'affaires a.i.	(N/A)	Niamey	1960	
Nigeria	List	Vacant since January 16, 2026; Keith Heffern, Chargé d'affaires a.i.	(N/A)	Abuja	1960	
North Korea	The United States does not maintain diplomatic relations with North Korea. Limited consular matters are handled by the Swedish embassy. (Note: American citizens who travel to North Korea do so at their own risk and in some cases in violation of U.S. and/or UN sanctions.)					
North Macedonia	List	Vacant since January 22, 2026; Nicole Vernes, Chargé d'affaires a.i.	(N/A)	Skopje	1993	
Norway	List	Michael E. Kavoukjian	PA	Oslo Homepage	1905	August 7, 2026
Oman	List	Ana A. Escrogima	CD	Muscat	1972	October 17, 2023
Pakistan	List	Vacant since January 10, 2025; Natalie A. Baker, chargé d'affaires a.i.	(N/A)	Islamabad Homepage	1947	
Palau	List	Vacant since May 4, 2026; Shankar Rao, chargé d'affaires a.i.	(N/A)	Koror	2004	
Panama	List	Kevin Marino Cabrera	PA	Panama City	1903	April 9, 2025
Papua New Guinea (Note: One ambassador, resident at Port Moresby, is accredited to Papua New Guinea, Solomon Islands, and Vanuatu.)	List	Vacant since January 16, 2026; Alex M. Berenberg, Chargé d'affaires a.i.	(N/A)	Port Moresby	1975	
Paraguay	List	Vacant since January 20, 2025; Robert Alter, chargé d'affaires a.i.	(N/A)	Asunción	1861	
Peru	List	Bernardo Navarro	PA	Lima Homepage	1827	December 18, 2025
Philippines	List	Lee Lipton	PA	Manila Homepage	1946	May 18, 2026
Poland	List	Tom Rose	PA	Warsaw Homepage	1919	October 7, 2025
Portugal	List	John Arrigo	PA	Lisbon Homepage	1791	August 2, 2025
Qatar	List	Vacant since June 15, 2025; Chris Hodges, chargé d'affaires a.i.	(N/A)	Doha	1971	
Romania	List	Darryl Nirenberg	PA	Bucharest	1880	December 18, 2025
Russia	List	Vacant since June 27, 2025; J. Douglas Dykhouse, chargé d'affaires	(N/A)	Moscow Homepage	1809	
Rwanda	List	Vacant since January 14, 2026; John Armiger, chargé d'affaires a.i.	(N/A)	Kigali	1963	
Saint Kitts and Nevis	List	Vacant since January 20, 2025; Karin B. Sullivan, Chargé d'affaires a.i.	(N/A)	Bridgetown	1984	
Saint Lucia	List	Vacant since January 20, 2025; Karin B. Sullivan, Chargé d'affaires a.i.	(N/A)	Bridgetown	1983	
Saint Vincent and the Grenadines	List	Vacant since January 20, 2025; Karin B. Sullivan, Chargé d'affaires a.i.	(N/A)	Bridgetown	1981	
Samoa	List	Vacant since January 14, 2025; Daniel Tarapacki, Chargé d'affaires a.i.	(N/A)	Apia	1971	
San Marino	List	Tilman Fertitta	PA	Florence; San Marino VPP	2006	April 29, 2025
São Tomé and Príncipe	List	Vacant since October 2024; Shannon Nagy Cazeau, Chargé d'affaires a.i.	(N/A)	Luanda	1975	
Saudi Arabia	List	Vacant since January 20, 2025; Jennifer Larson, Chargé d'affaires a.i.	(N/A)	Riyadh	1939	
Senegal	List	Vacant since January 15, 2026; Jennifer Davis-Paguada, Chargé d'affaires a.i.	(N/A)	Dakar	1960	
Serbia	List	Vacant since January 10, 2025; Alexander Titolo, Chargé d'affaires a.i.	(N/A)	Belgrade	1882	
Seychelles	List	Vacant since January 16, 2026; Christopher L. Green, Chargé d'affaires a.i.	(N/A)	Victoria	1976	
Sierra Leone	List	Daniel Travis	CD	Freetown	1961	September 30, 2026
Singapore	List	Anjani Sinha	PA	Singapore	1966	October 7, 2025
Slovakia	List	Vacant since January 16, 2026; Heather Rogers, Chargé d'affaires a.i.	(N/A)	Bratislava	1993	
Slovenia	List	Asel Roberts	PA	Ljubljana	1992	May 18, 2026
Solomon Islands	List	Vacant since January 16, 2026; Alex M. Berenberg, Chargé d'affaires a.i.	(N/A)	Port Moresby	1978	
Somalia	List	Vacant since January 15, 2026; Ruth Anne Stevens-Klitz, Chargé d'affaires a.i.	(N/A)	Mogadishu	1960	
South Africa	List	L. Brent Bozell III	PA	Pretoria	1929	December 18, 2025
South Korea	List	Michelle Steel	PA	Seoul	1883	June 17, 2026
South Sudan	List	Michael J. Adler	CD	Juba	2011	July 14, 2022
Spain	List	Benjamin Leon	PA	Madrid	1783	December 18, 2025
Sri Lanka	List	Eric Meyer	CD	Colombo	1949	May 18, 2026
Sudan (Note: The U.S. Embassy in Khartoum suspended operations in April 2023. The Ambassador operates from the U.S. Embassy in Addis Ababa, Ethiopia.)	List	Vacant since February 23, 2024; Jonathan P. Howard, Chargé d'affaires a.i.	(N/A)	Khartoum	1956	
Suriname	List	Vacant since January 28, 2026; Rosalyn N. Wiese, Chargé d'affaires a.i.	(N/A)	Paramaribo	1975	
Sweden	List	Christine Toretti	PA	Stockholm	1818	September 18, 2025
Switzerland	List	Callista Gingrich	PA	Bern	1853	September 18, 2025
Syria	List	The embassy was closed on February 6, 2014. Poland became the protecting power until its embassy closed on July 27, 2014, at which point the Czech Republic took responsibility.				
Taiwan	Since January 19, 1979, diplomatic relations have been carried out by the American Institute in Taiwan.					
Tajikistan	List	Vacant since January 20, 2026; Carson Relitz Rocker, Chargé d'affaires a.i.	(N/A)	Dushanbe	1992	
Tanzania	List	William Trachman	PA	Dar es Salaam	1962	August 7, 2026
Thailand	List	Sean O'Neill	CD	Bangkok	1882	October 7, 2025
Togo	List	Charles Goodman III	CD	Lomé	1960	September 30, 2026
Tonga	List	Vacant since January 16, 2026; Christina Cavallo, Chargé d'affaires a.i.	(N/A)	Suva	1972	
Trinidad and Tobago	List	Vacant since January 20, 2025; Philip Kern, Chargé d'affaires a.i.	(N/A)	Port of Spain	1962	
Tunisia	List	Bill Bazzi	PA	Tunis	1956	October 7, 2025
Turkey	List	Tom Barrack	PA	Ankara	1831	April 29, 2025
Turkmenistan	List	Vacant since July 20, 2026; Kristin Hawkins, Chargé d'affaires a.i.	(N/A)	Ashgabat	1992	
Tuvalu	List	Vacant since January 16, 2026; Christina Cavallo, Chargé d'affaires a.i.	(N/A)	Suva	1979	
Uganda	List	Vacant since June 2, 2026; Mikael Claverly, Chargé d'affaires a.i.	(N/A)	Kampala	1963	
Ukraine	List	Vacant since April 21, 2025; Paul R. Houston, Chargé d'affaires a.i.	(N/A)	Kyiv	1992	
United Arab Emirates	List	Vacant since August 5, 2025; Shannon Dolan, Chargé d'affaires a.i.	(N/A)	Abu Dhabi	1972	
United Kingdom (Note: The ambassador to the U.K. is known as the "Ambassador to the Court of St. James's".)	List	Warren Stephens	PA	London	1791	April 29, 2025
Uruguay	List	Lou Rinaldi	PA	Montevideo	1867	August 1, 2025
Uzbekistan	List	Jonathan Henick	CD	Tashkent	1992	August 4, 2022
Vanuatu	List	Vacant since January 16, 2026; Eric Sheffield, Chargé d'affaires a.i.	(N/A)	Port Moresby	1986	
Venezuela	List	Vacant since May 19, 2023; John M. Barrett, Chargé d'affaires a.i.	(N/A)	Caracas	1835	
Vietnam	List	Jennifer Wicks McNamara	PA	Hanoi	1997	May 18, 2026
Yemen (Note: The U.S. Embassy in Sanaa suspended operations in 2015. The Ambassador operates from the U.S. Embassy in Riyadh, Saudi Arabia.)	List	Vacant since July 3, 2026; Neil Hop, Chargé d'affaires a.i.	(N/A)	Sanaa	1988	
Zambia	List	Vacant since April 30, 2026; Mich Coker, Chargé d'affaires a.i.	(N/A)	Lusaka	1965	
Zimbabwe	List	Pamela Tremont	CD	Harare	1980	May 2, 2024
Abkhazia	The Republic of Abkhazia is not recognized by the United Nations or by the United States.					
Northern Cyprus	The Turkish Republic of Northern Cyprus is not recognized by the United Nations or by the United States.					
Palestine	The State of Palestine is not recognized by the United States.					
Sahrawi Arab Democratic Republic	The Sahrawi Arab Democratic Republic is not recognized by the United Nations or by the United States.					
South Ossetia	The Republic of South Ossetia is not recognized by the United Nations or by the United States.					

== Ambassadors to international organizations ==
=== Ambassadors to the United Nations ===
Current ambassadors from the United States to the United Nations:

Host organization	List	Location	Ambassador	Background	Website	Confirmed
United Nations	List	New York, United States	Mike Waltz	PA	New York City	September 19, 2025
United Nations (Deputy)	List	New York, United States	Tammy Bruce	PA	New York City	December 18, 2025
United Nations (Management and Reform)	List	New York, United States	Jeff Bartos	PA	New York City	September 18, 2025
United Nations (Special Political Affairs)	List	New York, United States	Jennifer Locetta	PA	New York City	September 18, 2025
United Nations Economic and Social Council	List	New York, United States	Dan Negrea	PA	New York City	October 7, 2025
United Nations Educational, Scientific and Cultural Organization	List	Paris, France	Vacant since January 20, 2025	(N/A)	Paris	
United Nations Human Rights Council	List	Geneva, Switzerland	Vacant since January 20, 2025	Geneva	(N/A)	
United Nations International Organizations in Geneva	List	Geneva, Switzerland	Todd Steggerda	PA	Geneva	August 7, 2026
United Nations International Organizations in Rome (U.N. Agencies for Food and Agriculture)	List	Rome, Italy	Lynda Blanchard	PA	Rome	October 7, 2025
United Nations International Organizations in Vienna	List	Vienna, Austria	Preston Wells Griffith III	PA	Vienna	August 7, 2026

=== Other international organizations ===
Current ambassadors from the United States to other international organizations:

Host organization	List	Location	Ambassador	Background	Website	Confirmed
African Union	List	Addis Ababa, Ethiopia	Vacant since December 30, 2025; Walter Parrs, chargé d'affaires a.i.	(N/A)	Addis Ababa	
Asia-Pacific Economic Cooperation	List	Singapore	Vacant since July 11, 2025	(N/A)	Singapore	
Asian Development Bank	List	Mandaluyong, Philippines	Vacant since January 20, 2025	(N/A)	Mandaluyong	
Association of Southeast Asian Nations	List	Jakarta, Indonesia	Yeouk Kim	PA	Jakarta	May 18, 2026
Conference on Disarmament	List	Geneva, Switzerland	Vacant since January 20, 2025; Todd Steggerda	PA	Geneva	
European Union	List	Brussels, Belgium	Andrew Puzder	PA	Brussels	August 2, 2025
International Atomic Energy Agency	List	Vienna, Austria	Preston Wells Griffith III	PA	Vienna	August 7, 2026
International Civil Aviation Organization	List	Montreal, Quebec, Canada	Vacant since July 1, 2022; Anthony Clare, chargé d'affaires a.i.	(N/A)	Montreal	
North Atlantic Treaty Organization	List	Brussels, Belgium	Matthew Whitaker	PA	Brussels	April 1, 2025
Organization for Economic Co-operation and Development	List	Paris, France	John Hurley	PA	Paris	August 7, 2026
Organization for the Prohibition of Chemical Weapons	List	The Hague, Netherlands	Nicole Shampaine	CD	The Hague	February 6, 2024
Organization for Security and Co-operation in Europe	List	Vienna, Austria	Darrell Owens	PA	Vienna	June 23, 2026
Organization of American States	List	Washington, D.C., United States	Leandro Rizzuto Jr.	PA	Washington, D.C.	October 7, 2025

== Ambassadors-at-large ==
Current ambassadors-at-large from the United States with worldwide responsibility:

Portfolio	List	Ambassador	Background	Website	Confirmed
Arctic Affairs	List	Vacant since January 20, 2025			
Counterterrorism	List	Gregory LoGerfo	CD		May 18, 2026
Cyberspace and Digital Policy	List	Adam Cassady	PA		August 7, 2026
Global AIDS Combat (Note: Full title is Ambassador-at-Large, U.S. Global AIDS Coordinator and Senior Bureau Official for Global Health Security and Diplomacy)	List	Vacant since January 20, 2025; Jeffrey Graham, Acting Coordinator	N/A		
Global Criminal Justice	List	Vacant since January 20, 2025	N/A		
Global Women's Issues	List	Vacant since January 20, 2025	N/A		
International Religious Freedom	List	Vacant since January 20, 2025	N/A		
Monitor and Combat Trafficking in Persons	List	Barbera Thornhill	PA		August 7, 2026

== Other officials with the rank of ambassador ==
Officials who were granted the rank of ambassador in their senate confirmations:

=== U.S. Department of State ===
Position	Ambassador	Background	Website	Confirmed
Chief of Protocol	Monica Crowley	PA		May 12, 2025
Coordinator for International Communications and Information	Vacant since July 11, 2025			
Director of the Office of Foreign Missions	Vacant since January 20, 2025; Lew Olowski, Senior Bureau Official	(N/A)		
Special Envoy on North Korean Human Rights Issues	Vacant since January 20, 2025			
Special Envoy to Monitor and Combat Anti-Semitism	Vacant since January 20, 2025			
Special Representative of the President for Nuclear Nonproliferation	Vacant since January 20, 2025			

=== Office of the United States Trade Representative ===
Position	Ambassador	Background	Website	Confirmed
United States Trade Representative	Jamieson Greer	PA		February 26, 2025
Deputy United States Trade Representative (Western Hemisphere, Europe, the Middle East, Labor, and Environment)	Jeffrey Goetman	PA		December 18, 2025
Deputy United States Trade Representative (Asia, Africa, Investment, Services, Textiles, and Industrial Competitiveness)	Bryan Switzer	PA		September 18, 2025
Deputy United States Trade Representative (Geneva Office)	Joseph Barloon	PA		October 7, 2025
Chief Agricultural Negotiator, Office of the United States Trade Representative	Julie Callahan	PA		December 18, 2025
Chief Innovation and Intellectual Property Negotiator, Office of the United States Trade Representative	Vacant since February 24, 2016	(N/A)		

== Other chiefs of mission ==
Senior diplomatic representatives of the United States hosted in posts other than embassies. Unlike other consulates, these persons report directly to the Secretary of State.

Host country	List	Ambassador	Title	Website	Appointed
Curaçao (Note: While solely accredited to Curaçao, the United States Consul General to Curaçao is responsible for all the countries and special municipalities of the former Netherlands Antilles, including Aruba, Curaçao, Sint Maarten, Bonaire, Saba and Sint Eustatius.)	List	Ramon Negron	Consul General and Chief of Mission	Curaçao	June 9, 2025
Hong Kong (Note: The United States Consul General to Hong Kong, resident in Hong Kong, is concurrently accredited to Macau.)	List	Julie Eadeh	Consul General and Chief of Mission	Hong Kong	August 2025
Taiwan	List	Raymond F. Greene	Director	Taipei	July 8, 2024

== Special envoys, representatives, coordinators, and other officeholders ==
These diplomatic officials report directly to the Secretary of State. Many oversee a portfolio not restricted to one nation, often an overall goal, and are not usually subject to Senate confirmation. Unlike the State Department offices and diplomats listed in other sections of this article, the offices and special envoys, representatives or coordinators listed in this section are created and staffed by direction of top federal executive administrators – primarily U.S. Presidents and Secretaries of State – whose political or organizational management philosophies may not be shared by their successors. As such, many of these positions may go unfilled upon assumption of office by successor presidential administrations, with their offices sometimes merged with or subsumed into other offices, or abolished altogether.

== Nations without exchange of ambassadors ==
- Bhutan: According to the U.S. State Department, "The United States and the Kingdom of Bhutan have not established formal diplomatic relations; however, the two governments have informal and cordial relations." Informal contact with the nation of Bhutan is maintained through the U.S. Embassy in New Delhi.
- Iran: On April 7, 1980, the United States broke diplomatic relations with Iran after the 1979 Iranian revolution. On April 24, 1981, the Swiss government assumed representation of U.S. interests in Tehran, and Algeria assumed representation of Iranian interests in the United States. Currently, Iranian interests in the United States are represented by the government of Pakistan. The U.S. Department of State named Iran a "State Sponsor of Terrorism" on January 19, 1984.
- North Korea: The Democratic People's Republic of Korea is not on friendly terms with the United States, and while talks between the two countries are ongoing, there is no exchange of ambassadors. Sweden functions as Protective Power for the United States in Pyongyang and performs limited consular responsibilities for U.S. citizens in North Korea.
- Syria: On February 6, 2012, the United States suspended operations at its embassy in Damascus. On May 5, 2014, the United States recognized the National Coalition of Syrian Revolutionary and Opposition Forces as the foreign mission of Syria.
- Taiwan: With the normalization of relations with the People's Republic of China in 1979, the United States has not maintained official diplomatic relations with Taiwan. Relations between Taiwan and the United States are maintained through an unofficial instrumentality, the American Institute in Taiwan, functions as a de facto embassy, performing most consular functions and staffed by Foreign Service officers.

== Notable past ambassadors ==
Many well-known individuals have served the United States as ambassadors, or in formerly analogous positions such as envoy, including several who also became President of the United States (indicated in boldface below). Some notable ambassadors have included:

Ambassador	Host country or organization
**John Adams**	United Kingdom, Netherlands
**John Quincy Adams**	United Kingdom, Russia, Netherlands, Germany
Madeleine Albright	United Nations
Lindy Boggs	Holy See
John Bolton	United Nations
Kenneth Braithwaite	Norway
Carol Moseley Braun	New Zealand
Paul Bremer	Netherlands
**James Buchanan**	Russia, United Kingdom
**George H. W. Bush**	United Nations, China
Lewis Cass	France
Cassius Marcellus Clay	Russia
George M. Dallas	Russia, United Kingdom
John W. Davis	United Kingdom
Charles G. Dawes	United Kingdom
William L. Dayton	France
Frederick Douglass	Haiti
Lawrence Eagleburger	Yugoslavia
Rahm Emanuel	Japan
Geraldine Ferraro	UNHRC
Tom Foley	Japan
Benjamin Franklin	France, Sweden
John Kenneth Galbraith	India
Eric Garcetti	India
Callista Gingrich	Holy See
Richard Grenell	Germany
Bill Hagerty	Japan
Nikki Haley	United Nations
Hannibal Hamlin	Spain
Averell Harriman	Soviet Union, United Kingdom
Pamela Harriman	France
Patricia Roberts Harris	Luxembourg
**William Henry Harrison**	Colombia
Richard Holbrooke	Germany, United Nations
James C. Hormel	Luxembourg
Jon Huntsman Jr.	Singapore, China, Russia

Ambassador	Host country or organization
Washington Irving	Spain
John Jay	Spain
**Thomas Jefferson**	France
Caroline Kennedy	Japan, Australia
Jean Kennedy Smith	Ireland
Joseph P. Kennedy Sr.	United Kingdom
William R. King	France
Jeane Kirkpatrick	United Nations
Michelle Kwan	Belize
Robert Todd Lincoln	United Kingdom
Henry Cabot Lodge Jr.	United Nations, Germany
Clare Boothe Luce	Italy
George C. Marshall	China
Cindy McCain	UN Agencies for Food and Agriculture
George McGovern	UN-Rome
John Y. Mason	France
Walter Mondale	Japan
**James Monroe**	France, United Kingdom
Levi P. Morton	France
Daniel Patrick Moynihan	India, United Nations
Phil Murphy	Germany
John Negroponte	Honduras, Mexico, Philippines, United Nations, Iraq
James Lawrence Orr	Russia
Ruth Bryan Owen	Denmark
George H. Pendleton	Germany
Joel Roberts Poinsett	Mexico
Whitelaw Reid	France, United Kingdom
Bill Richardson	United Nations
Donald Rumsfeld	NATO
Sargent Shriver	France
Shirley Temple	Czechoslovakia, Ghana
Adlai Stevenson II	United Nations
Andrew Stevenson	United Kingdom
**Martin Van Buren**	United Kingdom
Paul Wolfowitz	Indonesia
Charles Yost	Laos, Syria, Morocco, United Nations
Andrew Young	United Nations

== Ambassadors killed in office ==
Eight United States Ambassadors have been killed in office – six of them by armed attack and the other two in plane crashes.

Name	Ambassador to	Place	Country	Date of death	Killed by
Laurence Steinhardt	Canada	Ramsayville, Ontario	Canada	March 28, 1950	plane crash
John Gordon Mein	Guatemala	Guatemala City	Guatemala	August 28, 1968	attack by Rebel Armed Forces
Cleo A. Noel Jr.	Sudan	Khartoum	Sudan	March 2, 1973	attack by Black September Organization
Rodger Davies	Cyprus	Nicosia	Cyprus	August 19, 1974	attack by EOKA B
Francis E. Meloy Jr.	Lebanon	Beirut	Lebanon	June 16, 1976	attack by Popular Front for the Liberation of Palestine
Adolph Dubs	Afghanistan	Kabul	Afghanistan	February 14, 1979	attack by Settam-e-Melli
Arnold Lewis Raphel	Pakistan	Bahawalpur	Pakistan	August 17, 1988	plane crash
J. Christopher Stevens	Libya	Benghazi	Libya	September 11, 2012	attack by Ansar al-Sharia

== Ambassadors to past countries ==
- Czechoslovakia (1919–1992)
- East Germany (1974–1990)
- Hawaii (1863–1898)
- Prussia (1797–1870)
- North Yemen (1946–1991)
- South Vietnam (1950–1975)
- South Yemen (1967–1969)
- Texas (1837–1845)
- Yugoslavia (1919–2004)

== Flags ==
Flag of ambassadors of the United States of America

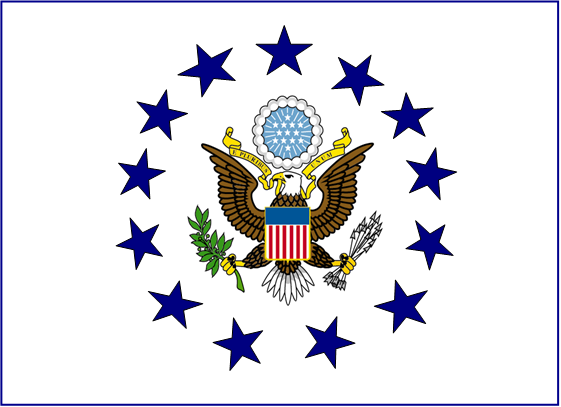
Flag of Chief of Mission of the United States of America

== See also ==
- Chief of Protocol of the United States
- List of ambassadors to the United States
- List of LGBT ambassadors of the United States
- List of female ambassadors of the United States
- List of ambassadors appointed in the first Trump presidency
- List of ambassadors appointed by Joe Biden
- List of ambassadors appointed in the second Trump presidency
- United States Foreign Service Career Ambassador
- List of diplomatic missions of the United States
