= List of ambassadors of the United States to the United Nations Educational, Scientific and Cultural Organization =

United States diplomatic position

Permanent Representative of the United States to the United Nations Educational, Scientific and Cultural Organization
- Seal of the United States Department of State
- Incumbent; Vacant since January 20, 2025
- Reports to: United States Ambassador to the United Nations
- Nominator: President of the United States
- Term length: No fixed term At the pleasure of the president of the United States
- Inaugural holder: John Howard Morrow
- Formation: 1961

The following is a list of U.S. ambassadors to the United Nations Educational, Scientific and Cultural Organization. The formal title is United States Permanent Representative to the United Nations Educational, Scientific and Cultural Organization with the rank of Ambassador during tenure of service.

The United States withdrew from UNESCO on December 31, 1984, rejoined in 2003, withdrew again in 2018, and rejoined again in 2023. On July 22, 2025, the United States announced its intent to withdraw once again from UNESCO, to be effective on December 31, 2026.

== U.S. Permanent Representatives to UNESCO ==
Ambassador	Image	Assumed office	Left office
John Howard Morrow		April 2, 1961	February 16, 1963
Crane Haussamen		January 1, 1962	September 13, 1964
Robert Hirsch Beard Wade		August 21, 1964	September 20, 1969
Pierre R. Graham		September 7, 1969	September 15, 1973
William Bowdoin Jones		September 1, 1973	August 3, 1977
Esteban Edward Torres		October 12, 1978	September 8, 1979
Barbara W. Newell		September 26, 1979	February 16, 1981
Jean Broward Shevlin Gerard		November 6, 1981	December 31, 1984
Between 1985 and 2003, the United States was not a member of UNESCO.
Louise V. Oliver		February 12, 2004	January 20, 2009
David T. Killion		August 10, 2009	December 16, 2013
Crystal Nix-Hines		July 8, 2014	January 20, 2017
Chris Hegadorn (acting as Charge d'affaires ad interim)		January 20, 2017	July 23, 2018
Between 2018 and 2023, the United States was not a member of UNESCO.
Courtney O'Donnell		June 2024	January 20, 2025
