= Jamieson Greer =

American trade attorney (born 1980)

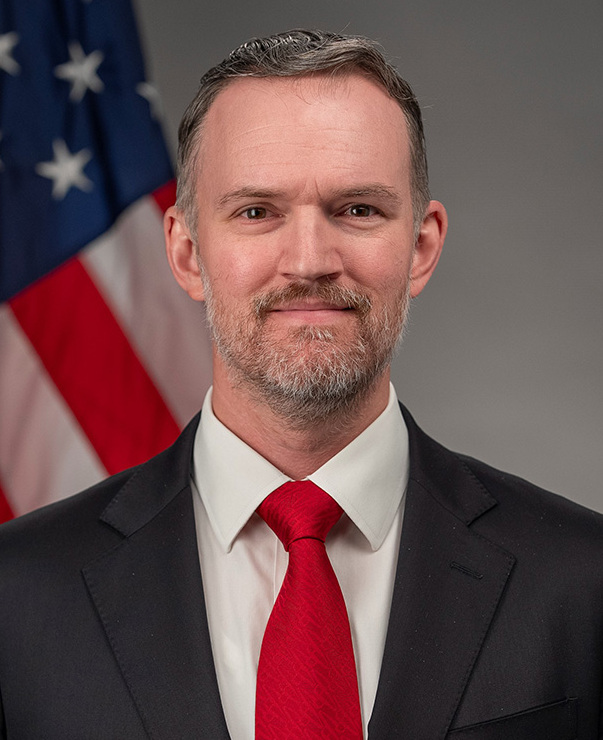
- Official portrait, 2025

20th United States Trade Representative
- Incumbent
- Assumed office February 27, 2025
- President: Donald Trump
- Deputy: Joseph Barloon; Bryan Switzer; Jeffrey Goettman
- Preceded by: Katherine Tai

Personal details
- Born: Jamieson Lee Greer; August 16, 1980 (age 46)
- Spouse: Marlo Zirker (m. 2004)
- Children: 5
- Education: Brigham Young University (BA); Sciences Po (LLM); Paris 1 Panthéon-Sorbonne University (LLM); University of Virginia (JD)

Military service
- Branch: United States Air Force
- Years of service: 2003–2012
- Rank: Captain
- Unit: Air Force Judge Advocate General's Corps
- Battles/wars: Iraq War

Jamieson Lee Greer (born August 16, 1980) is an American trade attorney and former Air Force officer who has served as the United States trade representative since February 2025. Greer has additionally served as the acting special counsel of the United States since March 2025. He served as the acting director of the United States Office of Government Ethics from March to August 2025.

Greer attended Brigham Young University, where he was a Mormon missionary. After graduating with a bachelor's degree in international studies, he obtained a joint master's degree in global business law from Sciences Po and Paris 1 Panthéon-Sorbonne University, as well as a Juris Doctor from the University of Virginia School of Law. Greer served in the United States Air Force Judge Advocate General's Corps and was the chief of military justice at Joint Base Balad in Iraq. After Greer's military service, Robert Lighthizer hired him at Skadden, Arps, Slate, Meagher & Flom in 2012. Greer worked in trade law for the firm and later for Kirkland & Ellis.

In June 2017, Lighthizer, the United States trade representative, hired Greer as his chief of staff. Greer worked with Lighthizer on several trade policies within the Trump administration, including initiating a trade war with China and signing the United States–Mexico–Canada Agreement. He represented the United States on Lighthizer's behalf in various events. Greer resigned from his position in May 2020 to work in private practice, becoming a partner at King & Spalding. In November 2024, President-elect Donald Trump named Greer as his nominee for United States trade representative. Greer appeared before the Senate Committee on Finance in February 2025, and he was confirmed by the Senate that month. Greer has been described as an "architect" of Trump's tariff policy by The New York Times.

== Early life and education (1980–2007) ==
Jamieson Lee Greer was born on August 16, 1980. Greer was raised in Paradise, California, the fourth of five children. Greer attended Paradise Intermediate School and Paradise High School, graduating in 1998. In the summers and during the school year, Greer worked as a dishwasher and at McDonald's. He is a practicing Mormon.

After high school, Greer attended Brigham Young University. He was a Mormon missionary in Belgium, France, and Luxembourg for two years, visiting Kosovo and Rwanda. Through his missionary service, he learned to speak fluent French. In 2004, he married Marlo Marie Zirker, whom he had met at Brigham Young; they have five children. He graduated from Brigham Young with a bachelor's degree in international studies. Greer later obtained a joint master's degree in global business law from Sciences Po and Paris 1 Panthéon-Sorbonne University in 2006, and a Juris Doctor from the University of Virginia School of Law. He was an intern for a Czech judge at the European Court of Justice for several months in 2007.

== Military service (2003–2012) ==
While attending Brigham Young University, Greer joined the military. He led a training at Ellsworth Air Force Base in 2003. Greer served in the United States Air Force Judge Advocate General's Corps and was stationed in Kansas, Turkey, and Iraq, including Joint Base Balad. In Iraq, he was the chief of military justice.

== Career ==
=== Legal work (2012–2017) ===
After Greer's military service ended in 2012, Robert Lighthizer hired him at Skadden, Arps, Slate, Meagher & Flom. Greer worked in the firm's international trade group defending U.S. Steel and other companies in trade cases. He later practiced in the international trade and national security group at Kirkland & Ellis.

=== Chief of staff to the United States trade representative (2017–2020) ===
In June 2017, Lighthizer, the United States trade representative, named Greer as his chief of staff. Greer additionally served as the Office of the United States Trade Representative's chief operating officer. Lighthizer dispatched Greer to the G20 summits on steel excess capacity in 2017 and 2018, as well as meetings with the World Trade Organization, South Korea, and Mexico. Greer worked with Lighthizer to initiate a trade war with China and to end the North American Free Trade Agreement, establishing the United States–Mexico–Canada Agreement.

=== Private sector work (2020–2024) ===
In March 2020, Politico reported that Greer had been interviewing for jobs in private practice. In May, he resigned as Lighthizer's chief of staff to become a partner at King & Spalding. Greer worked for the steel manufacturer Cleveland-Cliffs, agricultural firms Simplot and the National Milk Producers Federation, the oil and gas company Talos Energy, and several chemical producers, including BASF.

== United States Trade Representative (2025–present) ==
=== Nomination and confirmation ===
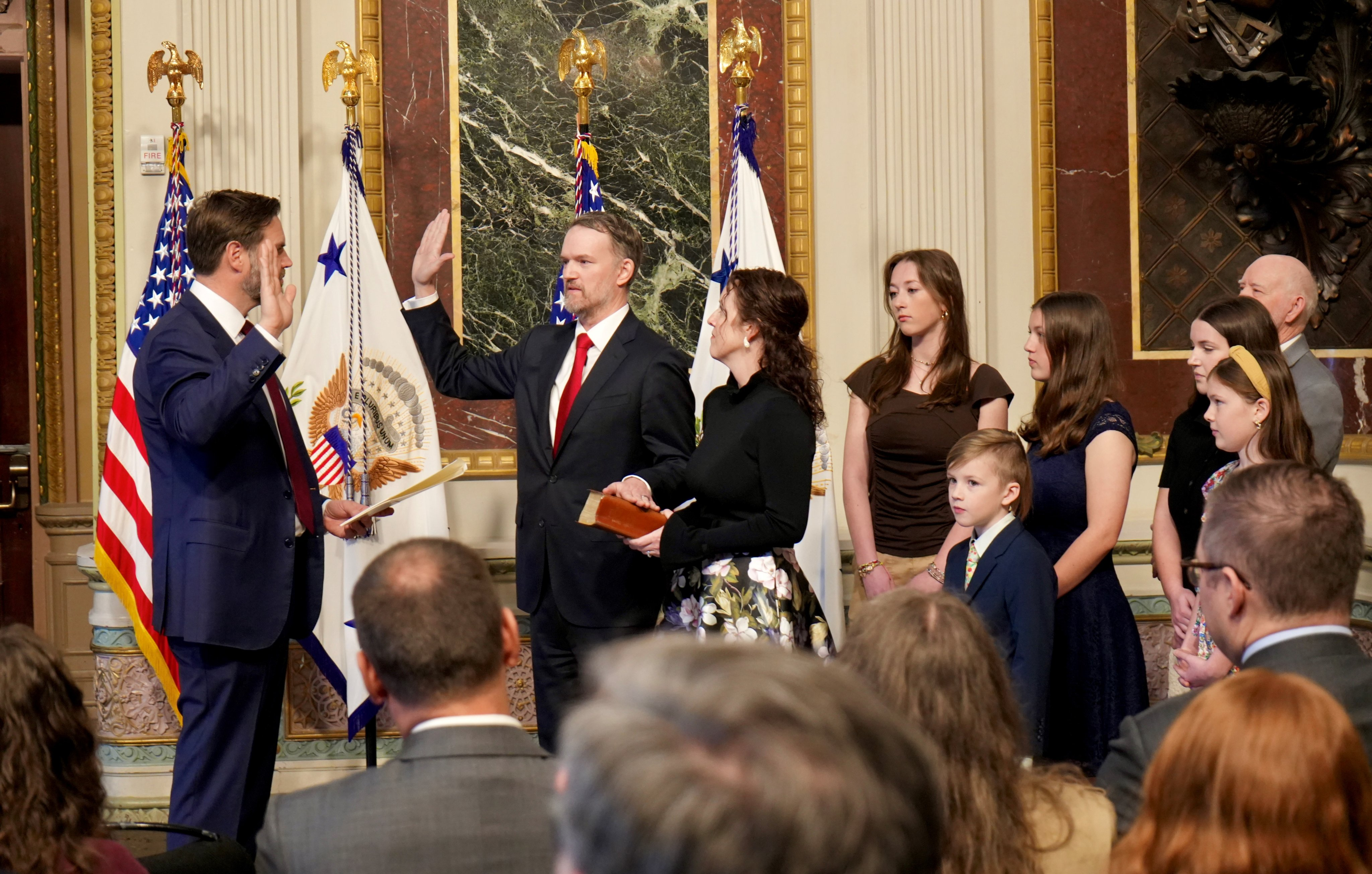
Greer is ceremonially sworn in by vice president JD Vance in April 2025.

In October 2024, Politico reported that Robert Lighthizer was expected to have an important role in selecting Donald Trump's staff if he won the 2024 presidential election. He was involved in trade and economic personnel and policy planning for Trump's second presidential transition. After Trump's victory, Greer was among several candidates considered to serve as the United States trade representative. Greer was endorsed for United States trade representative by Lighthizer, who did not want to serve in the position again. Jared Kushner, Trump's son-in-law, supported the decision. On November 26, Trump named Greer as his nominee to serve as the United States trade representative.

The decision came as Trump stated that his nominee for secretary of commerce, Howard Lutnick, would have "direct responsibility" over his tariff and trade policy. Lutnick and Greer worked together to set Trump's trade and tariff agenda within his first one hundred days. The unlikely alliance between Lutnick and Greer occurred amid the Trump administration's initial divisions between protectionists—including Greer—and cautious businessmen, including his nominee for secretary of the treasury, Scott Bessent. Prior to his swearing in, Trump relied on Lutnick and Greer to renegotiate the United States–Mexico–Canada Agreement and tasked them with imposing global reciprocal tariffs.

Greer appeared before the Senate Committee on Finance on February 6, 2025. He told the committee that the United States "should be a country of producers" and that he would restructure its approach to international trade. On February 12, the Senate Committee on Finance voted to advance Greer's nomination in a 15–12 vote largely along party lines. Rhode Island senator Sheldon Whitehouse was the only Democrat to vote in favor of the nomination. The ascension of Peter Navarro in determining Trump's trade policy provided urgency to confirm Greer. The United States Senate confirmed his nomination in a 56–43 vote on February 26. He became the trade representative that day.

=== Tenure ===
Greer was an "architect" of the second Trump administration's trade policies, according to The New York Times. Greer has supported Trump's tariff policy, seeking to implement it legally and negotiating trade agreements. was involved in discussions to impose the Liberation Day tariffs. After the tariffs were imposed in April 2025, Trump sent Greer to negotiate lower tariff rates with Japan. That month, he appeared before the Senate Committee on Finance. He faced questioning from Republicans over Trump's tariff policy, particularly the Liberation Day tariffs. As he was testifying, Trump paused his tariffs, surprising Greer. According to The New York Times, Trump established a strong relationship with Greer and tasked him to negotiate other agreements, including investment and security deals with Saudi Arabia, Cambodia, and Thailand.

=== Acting positions ===
On March 26, 2025, Greer was appointed as the acting director of the Office of Government Ethics and as the acting special counsel of the United States. In August, Trump named Eric Ueland to succeed Greer as the acting director of the Office of Government Ethics. Charles Baldis, a former Senate staffer, managed the Office of Special Counsel on Greer's behalf, and in September 2026, Baldis was appointed to the office.

== Views ==
In August 2017, Greer told the Chico Enterprise-Record that he agreed with President Donald Trump's trade policy. He has accused countries, including China, of implementing unfair trade policies against the United States. He has described trade deficits as a major issue. Greer has derisively described allied shoring as a lighter implementation of globalization. He opposes digital service taxes.

Greer supports implementing stricter economic policies towards China, including the aggressive enforcement of the trade deal that resulted from the China–United States trade war and using export controls and sanctions against China. He supports trade deals with countries such as the United Kingdom, Kenya, the Philippines, and India to counter China, as well as restoring the U.S. manufacturing base. Greer praised the Phase One trade deal signed between Trump and Chinese vice premier Liu He in January 2020. He has called for broadening tariffs on Chinese products to encompass other countries that manufacture products from Chinese companies.

On August 14, 2026, Greer criticized Canada for retaliating against the tariffs the United States imposed on goods from Canada in 2025. He pointed out that the U.S. will not accept any form of retaliation from Canada or any other country. He further stated that if a country retaliates, the U.S. will "take action".

Political offices
Preceded by Katherine Tai	United States Trade Representative; 2025–present	Incumbent
U.S. order of precedence (ceremonial)
Preceded by Russell Vought as Director of the Office of Management and Budget	Order of precedence of the United States as United States Trade Representative	Succeeded by Mike Waltz as Ambassador of the United States to the United Nations
