= C. J. Mahoney =

American lawyer

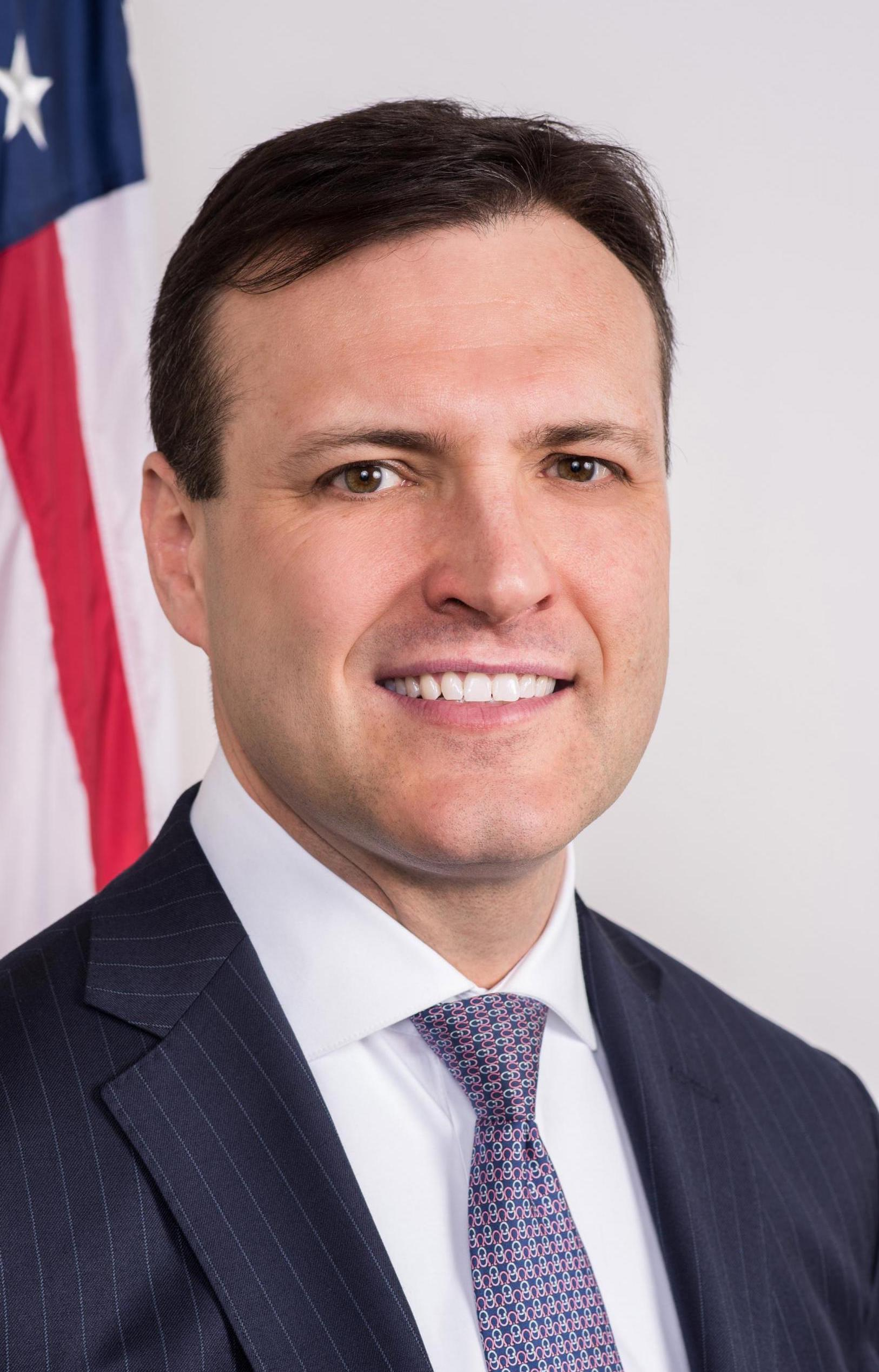

Deputy United States Trade Representative
- In office March 1, 2018 – December 31, 2020
- President: Donald Trump
- Preceded by: Jeffrey Gerrish
- Succeeded by: Sarah Bianchi

Personal details
- Born: Curtis Joseph Mahoney; 1978 (age 47–48) Russell, Kansas, U.S.
- Party: Republican
- Spouse: Rebecca Iverson (m. 2005)
- Education: Harvard University (BA); Yale University (JD)
- Occupation: Attorney; Chief Legal Officer

Curtis Joseph "C. J." Mahoney is an American attorney who serves as Chief Legal Officer of Meta Platforms, Inc. Mahoney previously served as the Deputy United States Trade Representative for Investment, Services, Labor, Environment, Africa, China, and the Western Hemisphere, and as a Corporate Vice President and General Counsel at Microsoft. He was formerly a partner at Williams & Connolly.

== Early life and education ==
Mahoney was born in Russell, Kansas and attended Russell High School. He has a Bachelor of Arts in government from Harvard College, where he was Phi Beta Kappa and graduated magna cum laude. In 2006, he received his J.D. from Yale Law School, where he was editor-in-chief of the Yale Law Journal. Mahoney clerked for Alex Kozinski of the United States Court of Appeals for the Ninth Circuit. He also clerked for United States Supreme Court Justice Anthony Kennedy from 2007 to 2008.

== Legal career ==
Prior to his government service, Mahoney was a trial lawyer and partner at the Washington, D.C. law firm of Williams & Connolly LLP, where his practice focused on international commercial arbitration, white-collar defense, the Foreign Corrupt Practices Act, legal malpractice, and First Amendment law.

The United States Senate unanimously confirmed Mahoney to serve as Deputy United States Trade Representative on March 1, 2018.

Mahoney led efforts to renegotiate the North American Free Trade Agreement and secure passage of its successor agreement, the United States-Mexico-Canada Agreement (USMCA), in the U.S. Congress. The USMCA passed the United States House of Representatives by a vote of 385 to 41 and the United States Senate by a vote of 89 to 10. The Washington Post described the overwhelming, bipartisan vote as “nice return to normalcy” in a time of partisan gridlock. Mahoney and his then-boss, Ambassador Robert Lighthizer, were credited with building strong working relationships with House Democrats, including then-Speaker Nancy Pelosi, in the lead up to the vote. Politico reported at the time that “Democrats tend to like [Lighthizer] and C.J. Mahoney, the Deputy USTR.

Mahoney oversaw the United States Trade Representative's digital trade initiatives and helped launch free trade agreement talks with the United Kingdom and Kenya. He also negotiated and signed an agreement between the United States and the African Union to support the implementation of the African Continental Free Trade Area (AfCFTA).

Mahoney resigned as Deputy United States Trade Representative in October 2020.

In January 2020, President Trump announced his intent to nominate Mahoney as the State Department Legal Adviser. Mahoney's nomination drew praise from members of the Federal Government of Mexico with whom he had worked during the USMCA negotiations and from prominent critics of the Trump Administration, including former Legal Adviser John Bellinger and former Assistant Attorney General Jack Goldsmith. A bipartisan group of former government officials, including former Legal Advisers, endorsed Mahoney's nomination in a letter to the Senate Foreign Relations Committee. In July 2020, the Committee held a hearing on his nomination and reported him favorably to the full Senate by unanimous consent. On January 3, 2021, his nomination was returned to the President under Rule XXXI, Paragraph 6 of the United States Senate.

On February 26, 2021, Microsoft announced that Mahoney had joined the tech giant as Deputy General Counsel, U.S. International Trade and Azure. In 2025, Mahoney was named General Counsel, overseeing the company’s product portfolio and commercial business.

In August 2024, Canadian Prime Minister Justin Trudeau invited Mahoney to address his cabinet at their annual retreat.

On January 6, 2026, Meta announced Mahoney's appointment as Chief Legal Officer, reporting directly to CEO Mark Zuckerberg. The company cited Mahoney’s experience in international trade, technology regulation, and corporate governance in announcing the appointment.

== Other professional activities ==
Mahoney has served on the Yale Law School Fund Board and as a visiting clinical lecturer at the law school where he taught a course on international arbitration.

Described by Politico as a “protégé of former Sen. Bob Dole,” Mahoney had a long association with the Kansas lawmaker and fellow native of Russell, Kansas. Mahoney seconded Dole’s nomination for President at the 1996 Republican National Convention. He now serves on Advisory Board of the Robert J. Dole Institute of Politics at the University of Kansas.

== Personal life ==
On August 13, 2005, Mahoney married Rebecca Ann Iverson in Washington, D.C.

Mahoney is the nephew of Emmy-nominated actress Marj (Mahoney) Dusay.

== See also ==
- List of law clerks for the first seat of the Supreme Court of the United States
