= Stephen Vaughn =

American lawyer

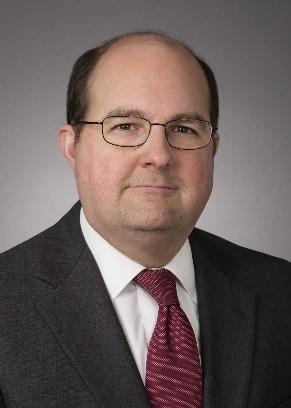

Acting United States Trade Representative
- In office March 2, 2017 – May 15, 2017
- President: Donald Trump
- Preceded by: Maria Pagan (acting)
- Succeeded by: Robert Lighthizer

Personal details
- Born: Paducah, Kentucky, U.S.
- Education: Vanderbilt University (BA); Yale University (JD)

Stephen P. Vaughn is an American lawyer and former general counsel to the United States Trade Representative. Before Robert Lighthizer's confirmation as USTR, Vaughn served as the acting Trade Representative.

Vaughn worked at Skadden, Arps, Slate, Meagher & Flom representing U.S. Steel. In 2016, he became a partner at King & Spalding international trade group. He focused on international trade litigation and policy issues. He represented United States producers such as U.S. Steel and AK Steel.

Vaughn started his career in commercial litigation and shifted his career to trade law in the early 2000s. He was a professor of law at Georgetown Law School.

Vaughn served on President Donald Trump's landing team to the Office of the United States Trade Representative. Vaughn and official nominee Robert Lighthizer have worked together representing steel manufacturers in the past at Skadden Arps.

On March 2, 2017, due to the U.S. Senate's delay in confirming USTR nominee Robert Lighthizer, Trump appointed Vaughn to the position of USTR general counsel and elevated him to acting USTR. Vaughn's appointment was likely the first time that someone from outside the department was appointed as acting USTR. These appointments did not require Senate confirmation.

Vaughn's positions on U.S. trade policy have been compared to those of Alexander Hamilton and Trump.

On April 22, 2019, the USTR announced Vaughn would resign his position in the coming weeks. Shortly after he returned to previous positions with King & Spalding.

Political offices
Preceded by María Pagán; Acting	United States Trade Representative; Acting; 2017	Succeeded by Robert Lighthizer
