= Jamie White (disambiguation) =

Jamie White (born 1968) is an American radio personality and actress.

Jamie White may also refer to:

- Jamie White (footballer) (born 1989), English footballer
- Jay White (born 1992), New Zealand-Dutch professional wrestler
- Jamie White, a fictional character from the MTV animated series Daria

== See also ==
- Jayme White, American diplomat
