= Butler Derrick =

American politician (1936–2014)

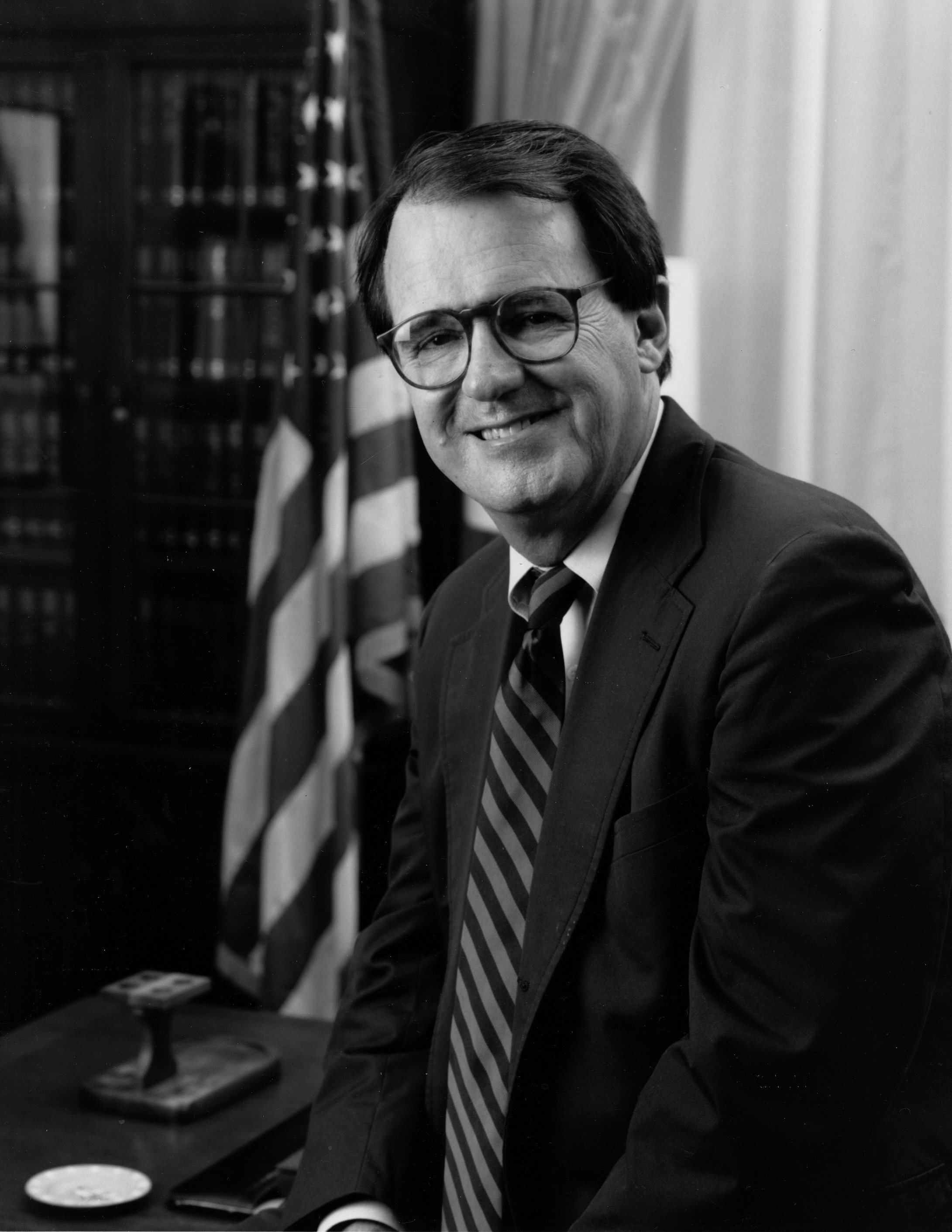

Member of the U.S. House of Representatives from South Carolina's 3rd district
- In office January 3, 1975 – January 3, 1995
- Preceded by: William Jennings Bryan Dorn
- Succeeded by: Lindsey Graham

Member of the South Carolina House of Representatives from the Edgefield County district
- In office January 14, 1969 – January 3, 1975
- Preceded by: Walter Clark
- Succeeded by: Constituency abolished

Personal details
- Born: Butler Carson Derrick Jr. September 30, 1936 Springfield, Massachusetts, U.S.
- Died: May 5, 2014 (aged 77) Easley, South Carolina, U.S.
- Party: Democratic
- Spouses: Suzanne Mims (divorced): Beverly Grantham
- Children: 4
- Relatives: Rita Derrick Hayes (sister)
- Education: University of South Carolina (BA); University of Georgia (LLB)

Butler Carson Derrick Jr. (September 30, 1936 – May 5, 2014) was an American politician. As a member of the Democratic Party, he served as a U.S. representative from South Carolina's 3rd congressional district from 1975 to 1995.

== Early life ==
Born in Springfield, Massachusetts, he moved to his parents' home state of South Carolina in his youth and attended the public schools in Mayesville and Florence. He graduated from the University of South Carolina in 1958 and earned an LL.B. from the University of Georgia Law School in 1965. He was admitted to the South Carolina bar in 1965 and commenced practice in Edgefield. He served in the South Carolina House of Representatives from 1969 to 1974, representing Edgefield County, and was a delegate to the South Carolina State Democratic conventions in 1972 and 1974.

== Political career ==
Derrick was a delegate to the Democratic National Convention in 1974. That same year, he was elected to the House from South Carolina's 3rd congressional district, succeeding longtime congressman William Jennings Bryan Dorn. He was reelected nine times. Although he represented a district that had become increasingly friendly to Republicans at the national level, he himself only faced serious opposition in 1988. Derrick served on the House Rules and Budget Committees during his tenure, and spent his final term as a Chief Deputy Whip.

Derrick did not run for reelection in 1994. As a measure of how Republican this district had become, one-term Republican state representative Lindsey Graham won the seat in a rout, taking 60 percent of the vote. By comparison, Derrick had won what would be his last election in 1992 with 61 percent of the vote. No Democrat has cleared the 40 percent barrier in the district since Derrick left office. This included 1996, when Graham defeated Debbie Dorn, William Jennings Bryan Dorn's daughter, with 60 percent of the vote to Dorn's 39 percent.

After retirement from Congress, he was a partner of Nelson Mullins Riley & Scarborough LLP in Washington, DC. He was elected to the Common Cause National Governing Board in 2009. After Congress, Derrick resided with his family in Charleston until a few years before his death, when he moved to Easley.

Derrick died of cancer at his home in Easley on May 5, 2014.

U.S. House of Representatives
Preceded by William Jennings Bryan Dorn	Member of the U.S. House of Representatives from South Carolina's 3rd congressional district 1975–1995	Succeeded by Lindsey Graham
