= Katherine Tai =

American government official (born 1974)

- 戴琪
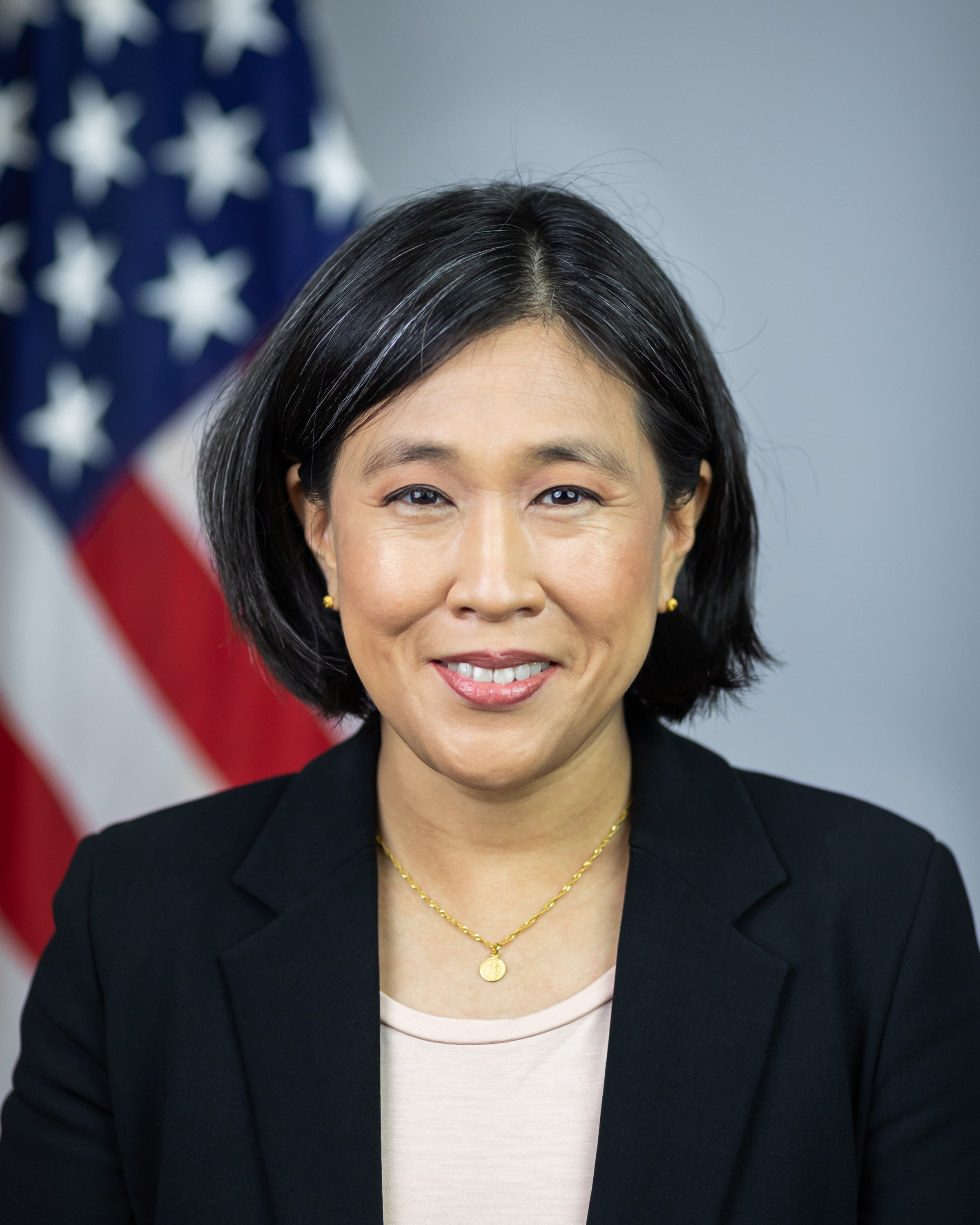
- Official portrait, 2021

19th United States Trade Representative
- In office March 18, 2021 – January 20, 2025
- President: Joe Biden
- Deputy: Sarah Bianchi; Jayme White; Maria Pagan
- Preceded by: Robert Lighthizer
- Succeeded by: Jamieson Greer

Personal details
- Born: Katherine Chi Tai; March 18, 1974 (age 52) Hartford, Connecticut, U.S.
- Party: Democratic
- Spouse: Robert Skidmore
- Education: Yale University (BA); Harvard University (JD)

Chinese name
- Chinese: 戴琪
Transcriptions
Standard Mandarin
- Hanyu Pinyin: Dài Qí
- Wade–Giles: Tai^{4} Ch'i^{2}

Katherine Chi Tai (Chinese: 戴琪; born March 18, 1974) is an American lawyer who served as the 19th United States Trade Representative in the Biden administration from March 18, 2021, to January 20, 2025. She is the first Asian American to serve in the position. Tai is a member of the Democratic Party and previously served as the chief trade counsel for the United States House Committee on Ways and Means.

== Early life and education ==
Tai was born on March 18, 1974, in Connecticut. She grew up in Washington, D.C., and attended Sidwell Friends School. Her grandfather, Li Hongji, served as a member of the first Legislative Yuan of the Republic of China. Her parents were waishengren from Jiangsu and Henan, born in mainland China. They relocated to Taiwan in 1949 during the Great Retreat and later immigrated to the United States.

Tai is fluent in Mandarin Chinese. In 1996, she graduated from Yale University, where she was a member of Pierson College, with a Bachelor of Arts degree in history. After college, she taught English at Sun Yat-sen University as a Yale-China Fellow for two years, from 1996 to 1998. Tai went on to study at Harvard Law School, where she earned a Juris Doctor in 2001.

After law school, she worked for several law firms, including Powell Goldstein, Sidley Austin, Baker McKenzie, and Miller & Chevalier, and clerked for U.S. district courts in Washington, D.C., and Maryland.

== Trade policy career ==
From 2007 to 2014, Tai served in the trade representative's Office of General Counsel, becoming chief counsel for China trade enforcement from 2011 until her departure. At the Office of General Counsel, she worked on trade cases at the World Trade Organization. In 2014, she became trade counsel for the House Ways and Means Committee. She was named chief trade counsel in 2017.

During Tai's tenure with the Committee on Ways and Means, she played a significant role in the House's negotiations with the Trump administration regarding the United States–Mexico–Canada Agreement (USMCA), advocating for stronger labor provisions. The Associated Press has described her as a "problem-solving pragmatist on trade policy".

== Trade Representative (2021–2025) ==
=== Nomination and confirmation ===
Tai's confirmation hearing to become Trade Representative; February 25, 2021

Tai was nominated by President-elect Joe Biden to serve as trade representative in December 2020. Tai has been described as both an "avowed progressive" and as a "consensus builder [who can] help bridge the Democratic Party's varying views on trade".

Hearings on Tai's nomination were held before the Senate Finance Committee on February 25, 2021. Tai was reported out of the committee by unanimous consent on March 3, 2021. The entire Senate confirmed her on March 17, 2021, in a 98–0 vote; senators Bernie Sanders and Mazie Hirono were absent for the vote.

=== Tenure ===
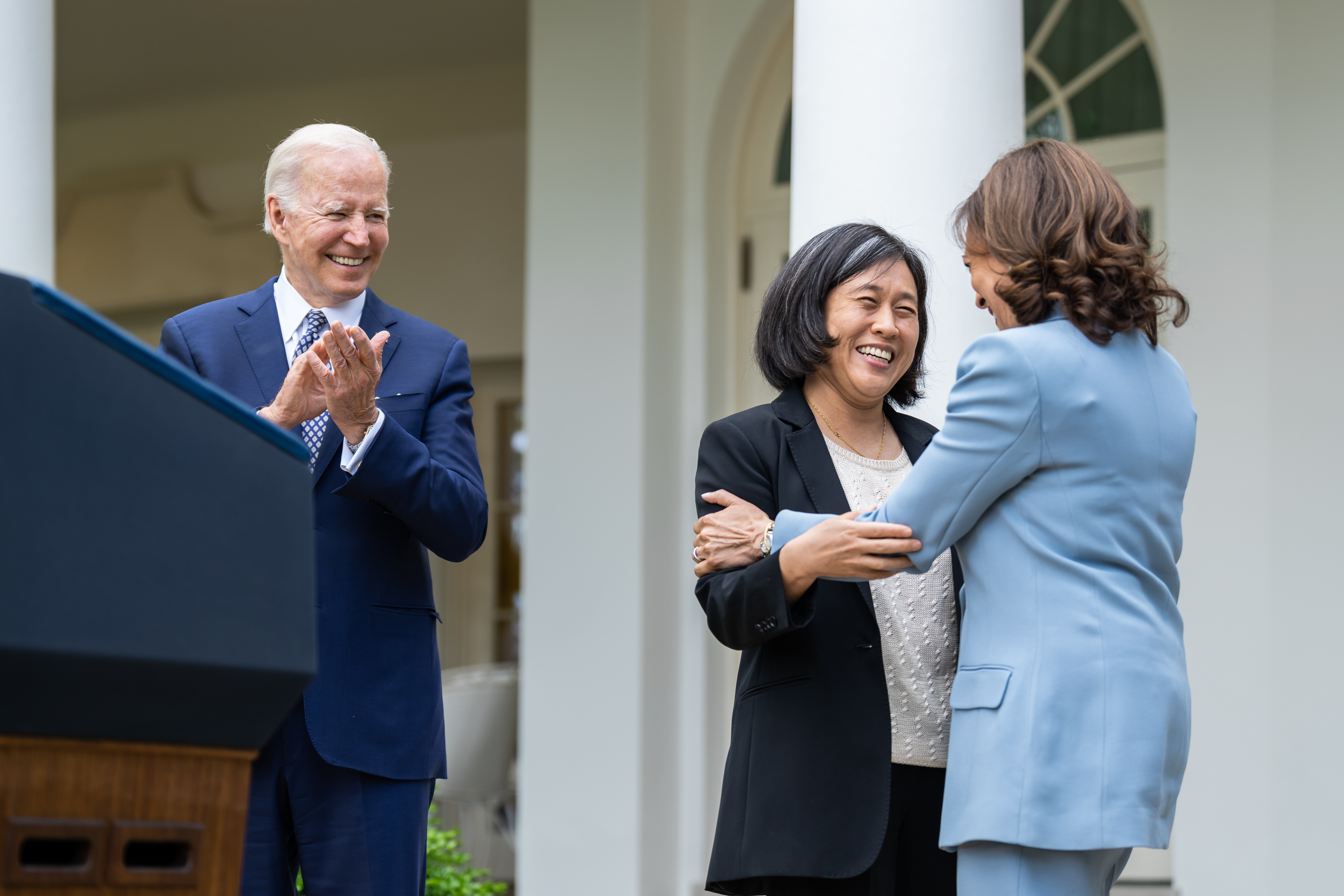
Tai with President Joe Biden and Vice President Kamala Harris in 2022

Tai was sworn into office on March 18, 2021. In her service as Trade Representative, Tai holds the rank and style of ambassador, and is a member of the Cabinet of the United States. As trade representative, Tai was credited by some advocates for pushing the Biden administration in favor of the TRIPS Waiver. In June 2021, Tai became the first trade representative to address the AFL–CIO in what was described as an effort to reset the USTR's relations with labor unions. As trade representative, Tai has been a co-chair of the Trade and Technology Council since its creation in 2021.

== Publications ==
=== Articles ===
- Trade must transform its role in the social contract, Financial Times, May 28, 2024

Political offices
Preceded by Robert Lighthizer	United States Trade Representative; 2021–2025	Succeeded by Jamieson Greer
