= Maria Pagan =

American attorney & trade representative

María Pagán
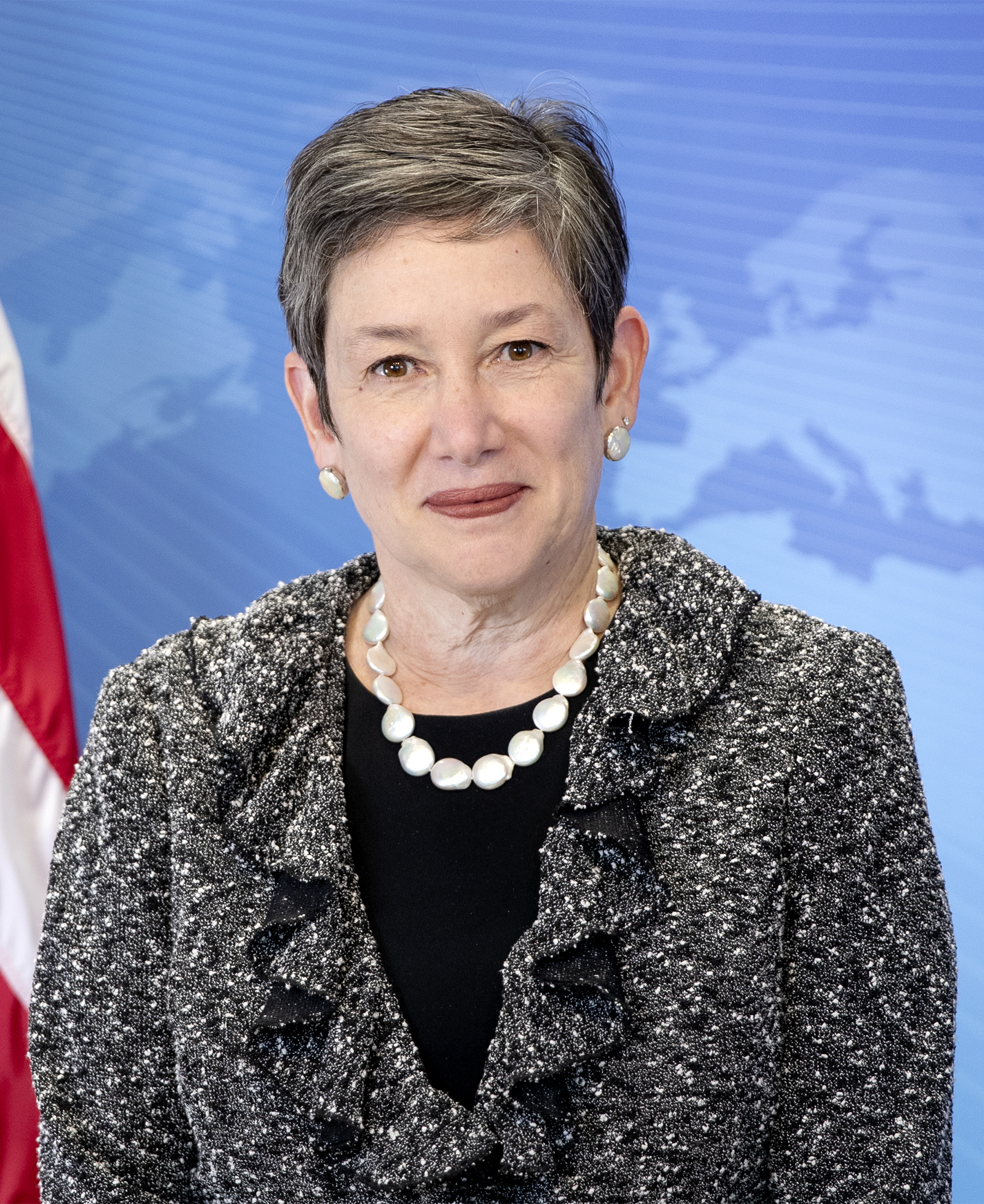
- Official portrait, 2022

United States Deputy Trade Representative for the Office of Geneva
- In office March 14, 2022 – January 20, 2025
- President: Joe Biden
- Leader: Katherine Tai
- Succeeded by: Joseph Barloon

Acting United States Trade Representative
- In office January 20, 2021 – March 18, 2021
- President: Joe Biden
- Preceded by: Robert Lighthizer
- Succeeded by: Katherine Tai
- In office January 20, 2017 – March 2, 2017
- President: Donald Trump
- Preceded by: Michael Froman
- Succeeded by: Robert Lighthizer

Personal details
- Born: Puerto Rico
- Education: Tufts University (BA); Georgetown University (MA, JD)

María Luisa Pagán (also spelled as Maria Pagan) is an American attorney who had served as the U.S. deputy trade representative in the Geneva office. Pagan was formerly the Deputy General Counsel of the Office of the United States Trade Representative (USTR), giving legal advice about trade negotiations, agreements, and regulations.

== Biography ==
Born in Puerto Rico, Pagán received her bachelor's degree from Tufts University and a master's degree and Juris Doctor from Georgetown University. After being a legal adviser at the U.S. Department of Commerce from 1993 to 2003, Pagán has been working at the USTR. She had a leading role in several trade negotiation teams.

During the transition from the Obama to the Trump administrations, she served as the acting United States Trade Representative. On January 20, 2021, she once again assumed the position of acting United States Trade Representative. In August 2021, President Joe Biden appointed her to serve as Envoy to the World Trade Organization (WTO).

=== Deputy U.S Trade Representative ===
Pagan was nominated by President Biden on August 10, 2021. Hearings were held on Pagan's nomination by the Senate's Finance Committee on October 26, 2021. The committee reported the nomination favorably to the Senate floor on November 17, 2021, by a 27–1 vote. On March 10, 2022, the Senate confirmed Pagan to be the next U.S. trade representative in Geneva, Switzerland by a vote of 80–19.

Political offices
Preceded by Michael Froman	United States Trade Representative; Acting; 2017	Succeeded by Stephen Vaughn; Acting
Preceded by Robert Lighthizer	United States Trade Representative; Acting; 2021	Succeeded by Katherine Tai
