= Rita Derrick Hayes =

American politician

Rita Derrick Hayes (born December 17, 1942) served as Deputy U.S. Trade Representative in Geneva and U.S. Permanent Representative to the World Trade Organization (WTO) from 1997 to 2001 under President Bill Clinton.

== Early life ==
Hayes was born in Worcester, Massachusetts. She was the sister of Congressman Butler Derrick, and her sister Mary Derrick Guest was married to Virginia House of Delegates member Andy Guest.

== Political career ==
During Richard Riley's tenure as Governor of South Carolina, Hayes chaired the Nuclear Advisory Commission. She later served as Chief of Staff for U.S. Representatives John Spratt and Liz Patterson. Hayes played a significant role on the 1993 Clinton-Gore Transition Team. She also held the position of Deputy Assistant Secretary at the Department of Commerce in the Office of Textiles and Apparel and Consumer Goods, where she chaired the Committee for the Implementation of Textile Agreements. Hayes was notably the Chief Textile Negotiator for the U.S. Trade Representative and participated in the Uraguay round. Her nomination for the Geneva position was supported by U.S. Senators Strom Thurmond and Fritz Hollings.
