= Sarah Bianchi =

American political advisor and investment analyst (born 1973)

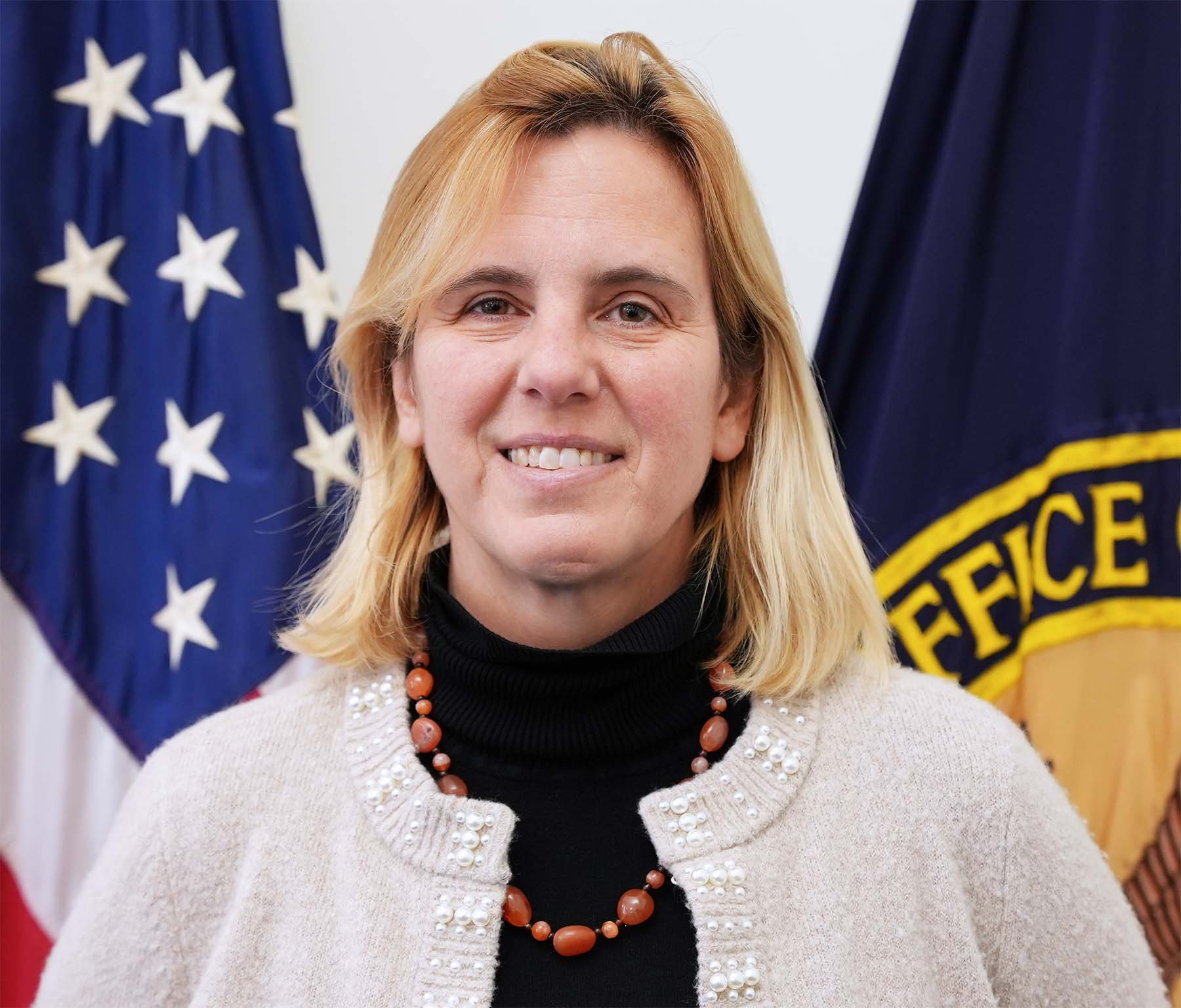

United States Deputy Trade Representative for Asia, Africa, Investment, Services, Textiles, and Industrial Competitiveness
- In office October 4, 2021 – January 29, 2024
- President: Joe Biden
- Succeeded by: Bryan Switzer

Personal details
- Born: February 16, 1973 (age 53) Atlanta, Georgia, U.S.
- Party: Democratic
- Spouse: Grant Vinik
- Children: 2, Josh and Eva Vinik
- Education: Harvard University (BA)

Sarah Bianchi is an American political advisor and former investment analyst who served as deputy United States trade representative for Asia, Africa, Investment, Services, Textiles, and Industrial Competitiveness. Prior to her confirmation as deputy USTR, she was a senior managing director at Evercore ISI, a global investment banking advisory firm.

== Early life, education, and family. ==
Bianchi was born in Atlanta, where she attended The Paideia School. She attended Harvard University, where she was roommates with Karenna Gore, the daughter of Vice President Al Gore, at Leverett House. In 2006, Bianchi married to Grant Vinik, a lawyer whom she met in government. Vinik is currently the General Counsel and Chief Operating Officer at Dunn, Isaacson, and Rhee, a newly formed law firm created after four prominent partners departed Paul Weiss. The couple have two children: Josh and Eva Vinik. They live in DC.

== Career ==
In a New York Times profile of Bianchi published on September 4, 2000, her career after her graduation is described to have included work as "an assistant to the associate director for health at the Office of Management and Budget, an assistant director for health policy of the Domestic Policy Council, the senior health care adviser to the vice president and...as deputy issues director" of the Al Gore's 2000 presidential campaign.

Bianchi later served as national policy director on John Kerry's 2004 presidential campaign. She also worked on the United States Senate Committee on Health, Education, Labor and Pensions for Senator Ted Kennedy, specializing on health policy. After serving on the campaigns of Gore and John Kerry, Bianchi joined the private sector.

While in government, Bianchi served as Deputy Assistant to the President for Economic Policy under President Barack Obama. Bianchi served as director of policy for Vice President Joe Biden from 2011 to 2014. USA Today wrote that Bianchi "helped Vice President Biden formulate the 23 executive actions in response to the Sandy Hook Elementary School massacre" and participated in the development of gun control legislation.

Bianchi also served as chair of the policy advisory board at the Biden Institute at the University of Delaware and was a member of the Institute of Politics board at Harvard for almost 20 years. Bianchi was identified as a potential addition to the Joe Biden 2020 presidential campaign team by The Hill and The New York Times.

=== Private sector ===
While Bianchi was at Evercore ISI, Bloomberg News reported on the 'Wall Street' view of the 2019 impeachment inquiry against Donald Trump, and quoted Bianchi, including her perspective that it could make other action more difficult, including prescription drug pricing legislation and the USMCA, and that it is "very possible that it will just further put each side in their respective camps and further polarize the country. What it does to the moderate middle of the road voters is very hard to say." Before the 2020 election, Bianchi was interviewed by CNBC about the potential impact of the election on the market.

Before Evercore ISI, Bianchi worked as head of global policy development at Airbnb.

Most recently, Bianchi has rejoined Evercore as a Senior Managing Director and is a visiting fellow at Columbia University. Since then, Bianchi has made several recent appearances on Squawk Box and CNBC to provide commentary on former President Trump, U.S. trade tariffs, and current economic conditions.

=== Biden administration ===
After the November 2020 election, Bianchi was named to a leadership position in president-elect Joe Biden's Covid transition team. On April 16, 2021, the Biden administration announced its intent to nominate Bianchi as a deputy trade representative in the Office of the United States Trade Representative for Asia, Africa, investment, services, textiles, and industrial competitiveness. Hearings on her nomination were held before the Senate Finance Committee on June 24, 2021. The committee favorably reported her nomination to the Senate floor on July 13, 2021. The full Senate confirmed her nomination by an 85–11 vote on September 23, 2021. She was sworn in by Katherine Tai on October 4, 2021.

Bianchi resigned from her position in January 2024.
