= Jayme White =

American political official and investment analyst

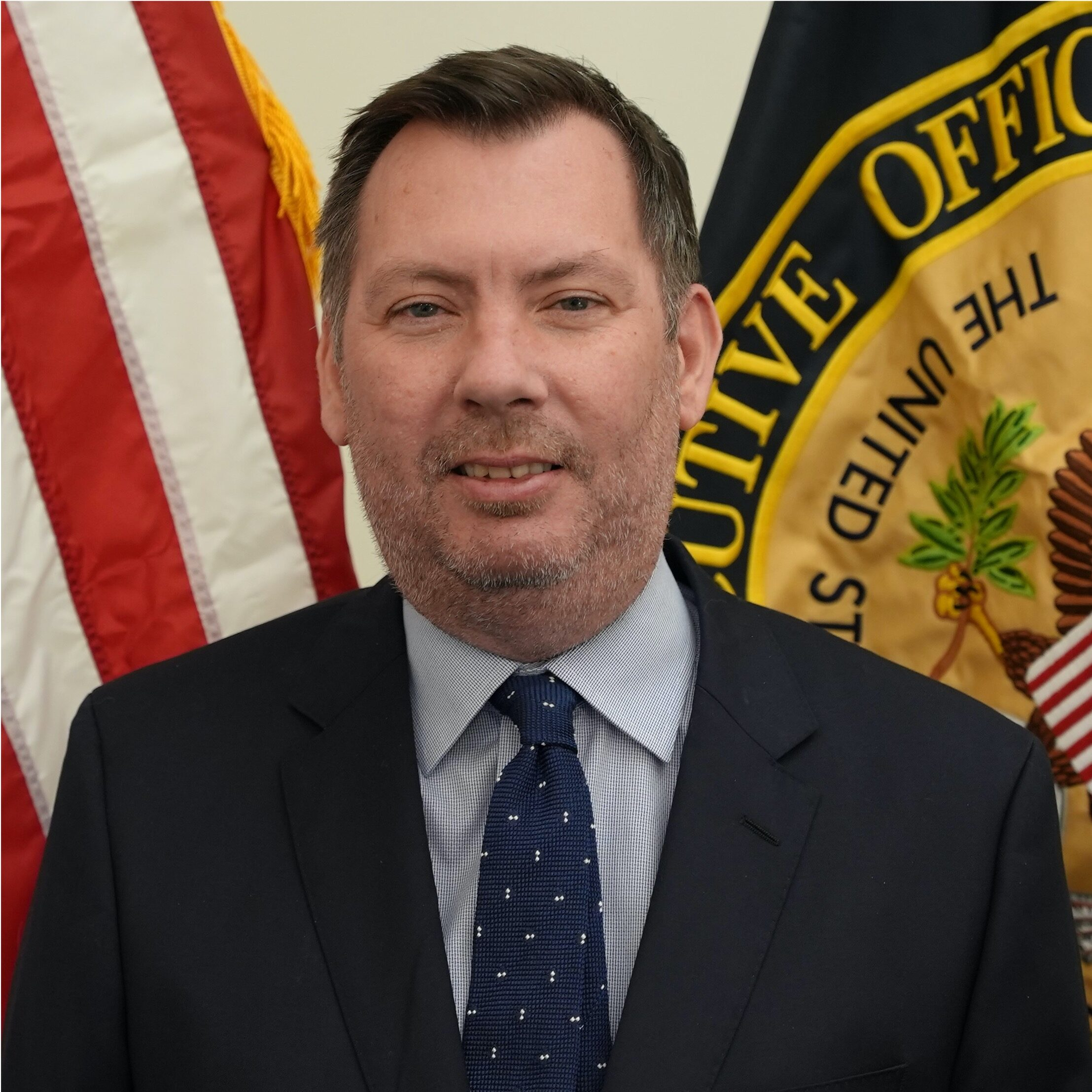

United States Deputy Trade Representative for Western Hemisphere, Europe, the Middle East, Labor, and Environment
- In office September 27, 2021 – November 1, 2023
- President: Joe Biden
- Leader: Katherine Tai
- Succeeded by: Jeffrey Goettman

Personal details
- Party: Democratic
- Spouse: Heather Zichal
- Education: Georgetown University (BA, MA)

Jayme Ray White is an American public official who served as deputy United States trade representative (USTR).

== Early life and career ==
White grew up in Seattle, Washington, and moved to Washington D.C. to work for his hometown Representative Jim McDermott. He later worked for Senator Ron Wyden as his Chief Trade Advisor and led negotiations for the United States-Mexico-Canada Agreement (USMCA). White worked on Capitol Hill for more than 20 years prior to joining USTR.

=== Biden administration ===
On April 16, 2021, the Biden administration announced its intent to nominate White as a deputy trade representative in the Office of the United States Trade Representative for Western Hemisphere, Europe, the Middle East, Labor, and Environment. Hearings on his nomination were held before the Senate Finance Committee on June 24, 2021. The committee reported his nomination favorably on July 13, 2021. The full United States Senate confirmed his nomination by an 80-18 vote on September 22, 2021. He was sworn in by Katherine Tai on September 27, 2021.

White was involved with a controversy on the influence of big technology companies such as Amazon and Google during his time at USTR. Liberal group Demand Progress and Senator Elizabeth Warren authored a report on this influence where White was quoted saying to a Google lobbyist “I have no doubt I’ll ask you for some advice down the road.”

White left the post on November 1, 2023.
