= David T. Killion =

American government official (born 1966)

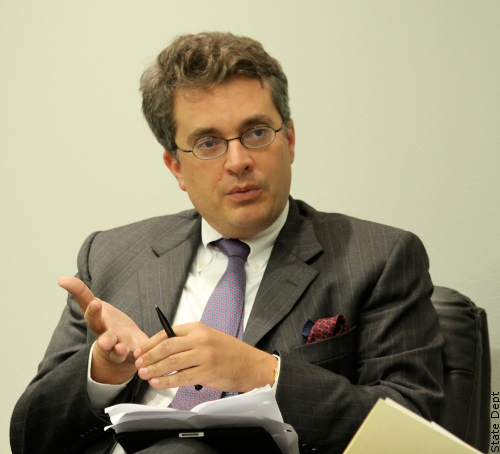

United States Ambassador to UNESCO
- In office 2009–2013
- President: Barack Obama
- Preceded by: Louise Oliver
- Succeeded by: Crystal Nix-Hines

Personal details
- Born: September 25, 1966 (age 60) Danbury, Connecticut, U.S.
- Education: Wesleyan University (BA); University of California, Los Angeles (MA, CPhil)

David T. Killion (born September 25, 1966) is an American government official and diplomat, appointed in 2009 by President Barack Obama to serve as the United States Permanent Representative to UNESCO, with the rank of Ambassador. He left that office in December 2013. On 10 April 2014, U.S. Senators Ben Cardin (D-Md.) and Roger Wicker (R-Miss.) announced Ambassador Killion's joint appointment as the Senate Staff Director for the U.S. Commission on Security and Cooperation in Europe (U.S. Helsinki Commission).

== Early life and education ==
Killion was born 1966 in Danbury, Connecticut. He received his undergraduate degree from Wesleyan University in Middletown, Connecticut. After earning his M.A. and C.Phil. degrees in political science from the University of California, Los Angeles, Killion worked as a congressional legislative staffer.

== Career ==
From 1996 to 2001, Killion worked as a Senior Legislative Management Officer in the U.S. Department of State Bureau of Legislative Affairs, under the Clinton administration. His areas of responsibility managing congressional relations included Human Rights, Democracy, War Crimes, Women's Issues, Oceans, and Environment and Science. From 2001 until 2009, he served as Senior Professional Staff Member for the U.S. House Committee on Foreign Affairs.

Killion was the committee's expert on State Department Operations, International Organizations, and International Education. In this role, he worked on the Global Anti-Semitism Review Act of 2004, which was enacted and created a Department of State Special Envoy to Combat anti-Semitism. Killion also helped draft H.R. 1469, the Senator Paul Simon Study Abroad Foundation Act, which was designed to increase the number of American college students studying abroad. In 2009, in recognition of this work, NAFSA, the Association of International Educators awarded Killion its Congressional Staff Champion Award “for his commitment to advancing international education.”

=== U.S. Ambassador to UNESCO ===
Under President Reagan, the U.S. in 1984 withdrew from UNESCO and did not rejoin UNESCO until twenty years later. During his service as Senior Professional Staff Member for the U.S. House of Representatives Committee on Foreign Affairs, David Killion worked to ease passage of legislation to allow the re-entry of the U.S. into UNESCO.

On June 25, 2009, President Obama appointed Killion U.S. Permanent Representative to UNESCO. Killion was sworn into office on August 12, 2009.

Soon after arriving in Paris in 2009, Killion was widely credited for his energetic role in preventing the Director-Generalship of UNESCO from going to the controversial artist and Mubarak-era Egyptian Cultural Minister Farouk Hosni.

Replying to anti-UNESCO American critics who have urged that the U.S. should again withdraw from participation in UNESCO, Killion has argued that, "there are critical American interests at stake [at UNESCO]: moral, cultural, national security, even economic interests. We think this is a strategic piece of real estate in the international system. It can get us to places we couldn’t get to otherwise.” He has insisted on UNESCO's value in promoting freedom of expression and science diplomacy, advancing girls' education, and defending Internet freedom.

The U.S. role in UNESCO has become complicated following the withdrawal of U.S. funding to UNESCO as a consequence of UNESCO's admission of Palestine (by a vote of 107–14, with 52 abstentions) as a member of UNESCO, on October 31, 2011. Killion delivered a statement on behalf of the United States expressing "regret" and calling the UNESCO decision "premature"; nevertheless, Ambassador Killion pledged that the United States would "continue our efforts to find ways to support and strengthen the important work of this vital organization."

Killion has been an enthusiastic supporter of UNESCO's work in anti-homophobic bullying and Open Educational Resources. Responding to the release of a UNESCO report on homophobic bullying worldwide, he called UNESCO "an essential partner for the United States in the struggle to ensure respect and equality for LGBT persons everywhere." Killion has also championed the potential of Open Educational Resources to transform global education, and, in June 2012, he led the U.S. delegation to the UNESCO-sponsored World Open Educational Resources Congress.

Killion successfully recruited prominent Americans such as Forest Whitaker and Herbie Hancock to be UNESCO Goodwill Ambassadors and has worked to support their work in peace building and jazz diplomacy. He also facilitated Marcus Miller's nomination as UNESCO Artist for Peace and Spokesperson for the Slave Route Project, including by hosting his Inducation Ceremony.

In July 2012, Killion issued a statement expressing U.S. opposition to UNESCO's decision to award the UNESCO-Equatorial Guinea International Prize for Research in the Life Sciences, which was controversially endowed by Equatorial Guinea. UNESCO's Director-General, Irina Bokova, joined Ambassador Killion in opposing the award; the U.S. considers Equatorial Guinea under President Teodoro Obiang Nguema Mbasogo to be a dictatorship with an egregious record of human rights violations.

Killion is credited with brokering, in cooperation with Russia and Israel, a breakthrough agreement on cultural heritage in the Middle East in April 2013. Killion called the deal between Israel and the Palestinians “a critical step forward toward depoliticizing UNESCO, and signals a major shift toward a more constructive approach to cultural heritage issues.” Killion's ongoing efforts to defend Israel from attack at UNESCO earned him praise from B'nai B'rith, which described Killion's tenure as being “marked by a series of very important accomplishments” and called him “an extraordinary diplomat and public servant—a man not only of commitment, but of skill and, no less important, of principle.”

When the United States was automatically stripped of its voting rights at UNESCO in November 2013, two years after cutting funding to the organization, Killion noted that the United States had been involved in UNESCO since it was founded in 1945 and promised that it would remain involved.

On April 10, 2014, U.S. Senators Ben Cardin and Roger Wicker announced Ambassador Killion's joint appointment as the Senate Staff Director for the U.S. Commission on Security and Cooperation in Europe (U.S. Helsinki Commission).

In 2014, after his service as U.S. Ambassador to UNESCO, Killion returned to work as a legislative professional, receiving a joint appointment as the Senate Staff Director for the U.S. Commission on Security and Cooperation in Europe (U.S. Helsinki Commission).
