= Crystal Nix-Hines =

American attorney, diplomat (born 1963)

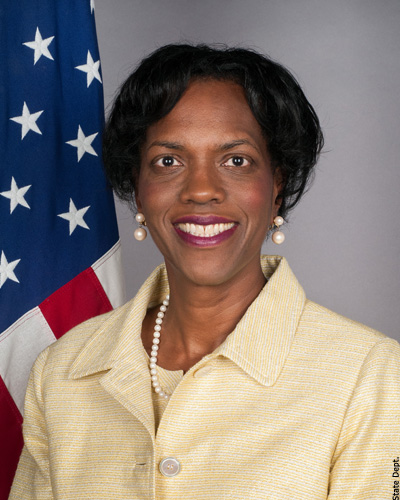

United States Ambassador to UNESCO
- In office July 16, 2014 – January 20, 2017
- President: Barack Obama
- Preceded by: David Killion
- Succeeded by: Courtney O'Donnell

Personal details
- Born: August 23, 1963 (age 63) Wilmington, Delaware, U.S.
- Education: Princeton University (BA); Harvard University (JD)

Crystal Nix-Hines (born August 23, 1963) served as the United States permanent representative to the United Nations Educational, Scientific, and Cultural Organization (UNESCO) with the rank of Ambassador between July 2014 and January 2017.

== Early life and education ==
Crystal Nix was born and raised in Wilmington, Delaware where her father, Theophilus R. Nix Sr., was the second African-American attorney admitted to the Delaware bar, and her mother, Lulu Mae Nix, founded social service organizations. She attended the Wilmington Friends School, along with her sister and two brothers, one of whom is corporate counsel at DuPont Corporation.

In 1985, Nix-Hines was graduated from Princeton University, where she was a classmate of Michelle Robinson Obama and the editor-in-chief of The Daily Princetonian. From 2006 she served for nine years on Princeton's Board of Trustees. In 1990, she graduated from Harvard Law School, where she served as an editor of the Harvard Law Review with Barack Obama.

== Career ==
Following law school, she clerked for Judge William A. Norris of the Ninth Circuit Court of Appeals from 1990 to 1991. From 1991 to 1992, she clerked for Justices Thurgood Marshall and Sandra Day O’Connor of the U.S. Supreme Court.

During her legal career, Nix-Hines has worked at Quinn Emanuel Urquhart & Sullivan, Fairbank & Vincent and O’Melveny & Myers, LLP. She also served as Assistant to the General Counsel/Senior Vice President of Capital Cities/ABC, Inc. and held several positions at the State Department, including Counselor to the Assistant Secretary for Democracy, Human Rights and Labor, member of the Department's Policy Planning Staff, and Special Assistant to the Legal Adviser.

Nix-Hines has also worked as a writer and producer on several network television shows such as Commander-in-Chief, Alias, and The Practice. She began her career as a reporter for The New York Times (in his memoir The Times of My Life and My Life at the Times, former Times executive editor Max Frankel wrote that in leaving journalism for law, Ms. Nix had “left a promising reporting career.”)

=== UNESCO Ambassador ===
On July 9, 2013, Nix-Hines was nominated by President Obama to the position of United States Permanent Representative to the United Nations Educational, Scientific and Cultural Organization (UNESCO) with the rank of ambassador. Nix-Hines was confirmed by the U.S. Senate on June 12, 2014, and sworn into office on July 16, 2014. During her tenure, she and her husband, David Hines, resided in Paris, France. On January 20, 2017, at the end of Obama's term, she stepped down from the post.

== See also ==
- List of law clerks for the eighth seat of the Supreme Court of the United States
- List of law clerks for the tenth seat of the Supreme Court of the United States

Diplomatic posts
Preceded by David Killion	United States Ambassador to UNESCO; 2014–2017	Incumbent
