= Robert Lighthizer =

American attorney and government official (born 1947)

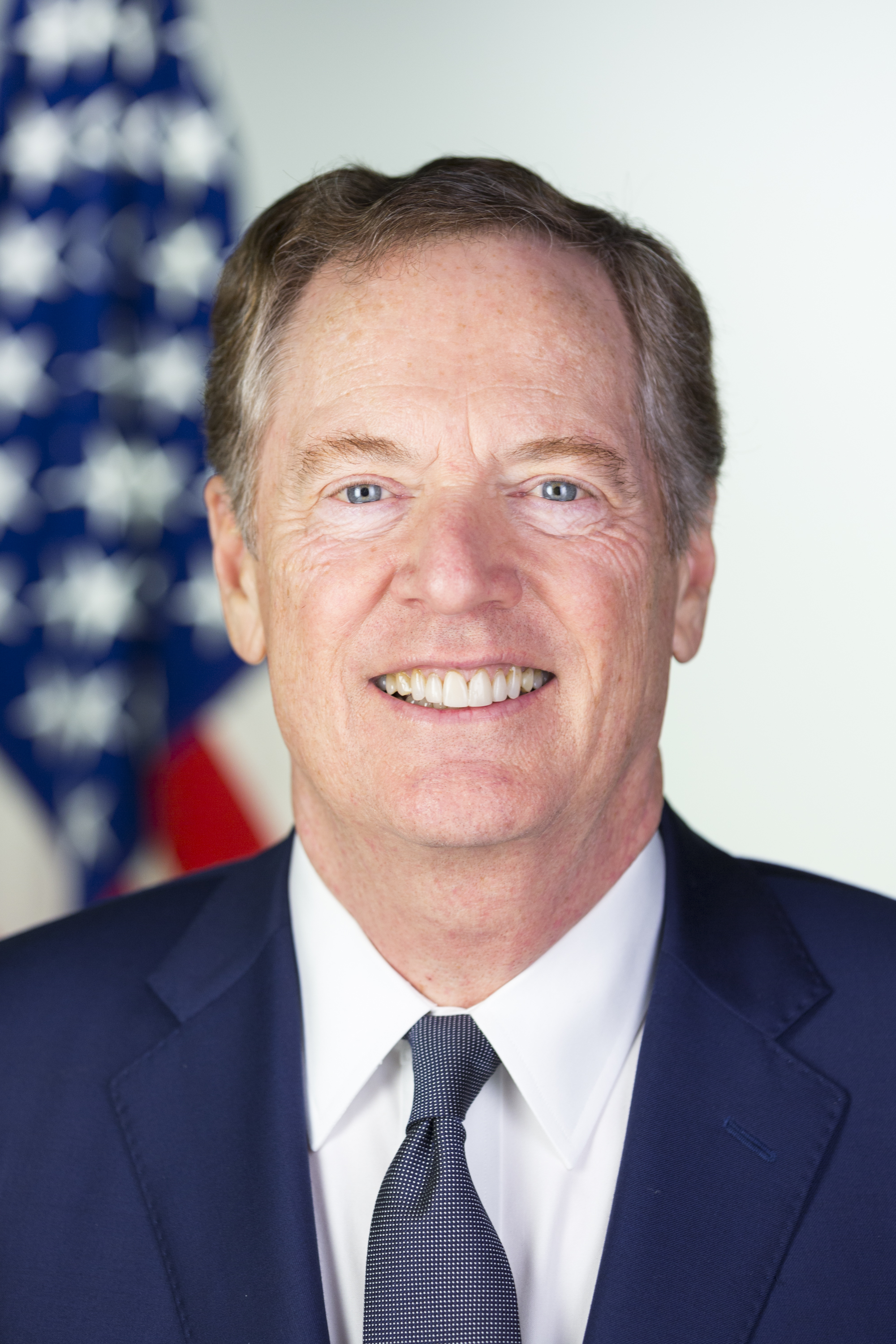
- Official portrait, 2017

18th United States Trade Representative
- In office May 15, 2017 – January 20, 2021
- President: Donald Trump
- Deputy: Jeffrey Gerrish; C.J. Mahoney; Dennis Shea
- Preceded by: Michael Froman
- Succeeded by: Katherine Tai

1st United States Deputy Trade Representative
- In office April 15, 1983 – August 16, 1985
- President: Ronald Reagan
- Preceded by: Position established
- Succeeded by: Alan Woods

Personal details
- Born: Robert Emmet Lighthizer; October 11, 1947 (age 79) Ashtabula, Ohio, U.S.
- Party: Republican
- Children: 2
- Education: Georgetown University (BA, JD)

Robert Emmet Lighthizer (/ˈlaɪthaɪzər/; born October 11, 1947) is an American attorney and government official who was the U.S. Trade Representative in the Trump administration from 2017 to 2021.

After he graduated from Georgetown University Law Center in 1973, Lighthizer joined the firm of Covington and Burling in Washington, D.C. He left the firm in 1978 to work as chief minority counsel and later staff director and chief of staff of the U.S. Senate Committee on Finance under Chairman Bob Dole. In 1983, Robert Lighthizer was confirmed by the U.S. Senate to be Deputy U.S. Trade Representative for President Ronald Reagan. In 1985, Lighthizer joined the Washington office of Skadden, Arps, Slate, Meagher & Flom as a partner and led the firm's international trade group. On January 3, 2017, President-elect Donald Trump announced his intention to nominate Lighthizer as his U.S. Trade Representative. Lighthizer was confirmed by the Senate on May 11, 2017, by a vote of 82–14.

Lighthizer was an architect of American trade policy during Trump's first presidency. He played a key role in the administration's renegotiation of NAFTA. Many of these trade policies were preserved, and in some cases extended, by the Biden administration.

== Early life and education ==
Lighthizer was born on 11 October 1947 to Orville James and Michaelene Lighthizer in Ashtabula, Ohio, where his father practiced medicine. He attended Gilmour Academy in Gates Mills, Ohio, and later graduated from Georgetown University with a Bachelor of Arts in 1969 and a Juris Doctor in 1973.

== Career ==
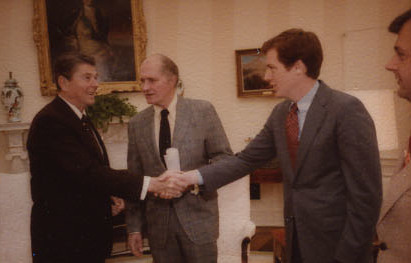
Lighthizer greeting President Ronald Reagan in 1983

After graduating from law school, Lighthizer joined Covington & Burling in Washington, D.C. as an associate attorney. In 1978, Lighthizer left Covington & Burling to work for Senator Bob Dole (R-Kan.), who at the time was the Ranking Member of the Senate Finance Committee. When Dole became Chairman of the Finance Committee in 1981, Lighthizer became the committee's staff director and chief of staff. While working for the committee, he helped shepherd through President Ronald Reagan's tax cuts and Social Security reform. In the 1980s, Lighthizer hired fellow Georgetown Hoya Patrick Ewing as an intern.

In 1983, during the administration of President Ronald Reagan, Lighthizer was nominated and confirmed to serve as Deputy U.S. Trade Representative under William Brock. During his tenure, Lighthizer negotiated over two dozen bilateral international agreements, including agreements on steel, automobiles, and agricultural products. As Deputy USTR, Lighthizer also served as vice chairman of the board of the Overseas Private Investment Corporation.

In 1985, Lighthizer joined the law firm Skadden, Arps, Slate, Meagher & Flom LLP (Skadden) as a partner. He practiced international trade law at Skadden for over 30 years, representing American workers and businesses ranging from manufacturing to financial services, agriculture, and technology. While at Skadden, Lighthizer worked to expand markets to U.S. exports and defended U.S. industries from unfair trading practices. He defended the steel industry in particular.

Lighthizer served in a senior position in the 1988 presidential campaign of U.S. senator Bob Dole. In 1996, he served as the treasurer of the Dole campaign.

=== Trade Representative (2017–2021) ===
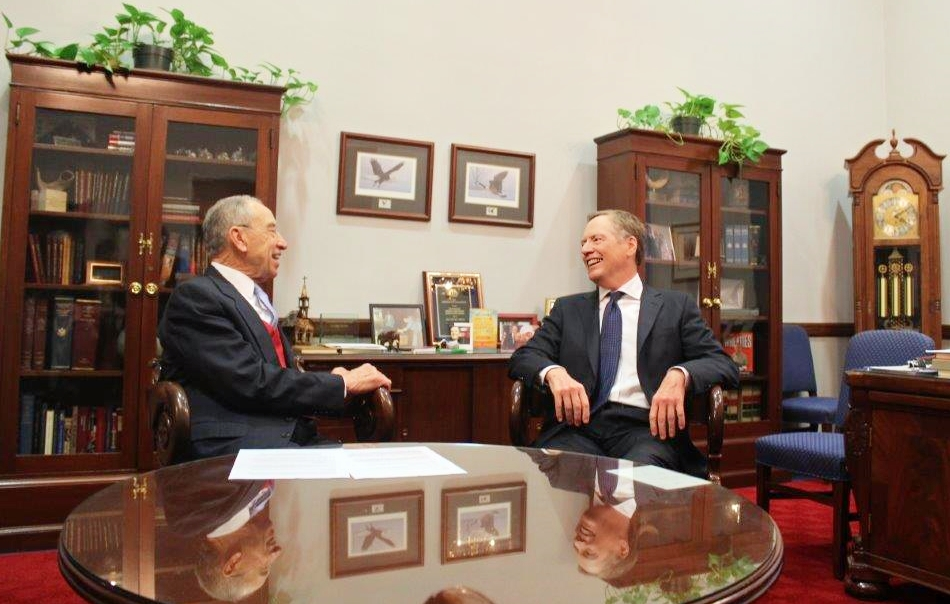
Lighthizer with former chairman of the Senate Finance Committee, Senator Chuck Grassley (R-Iowa) in January 2017

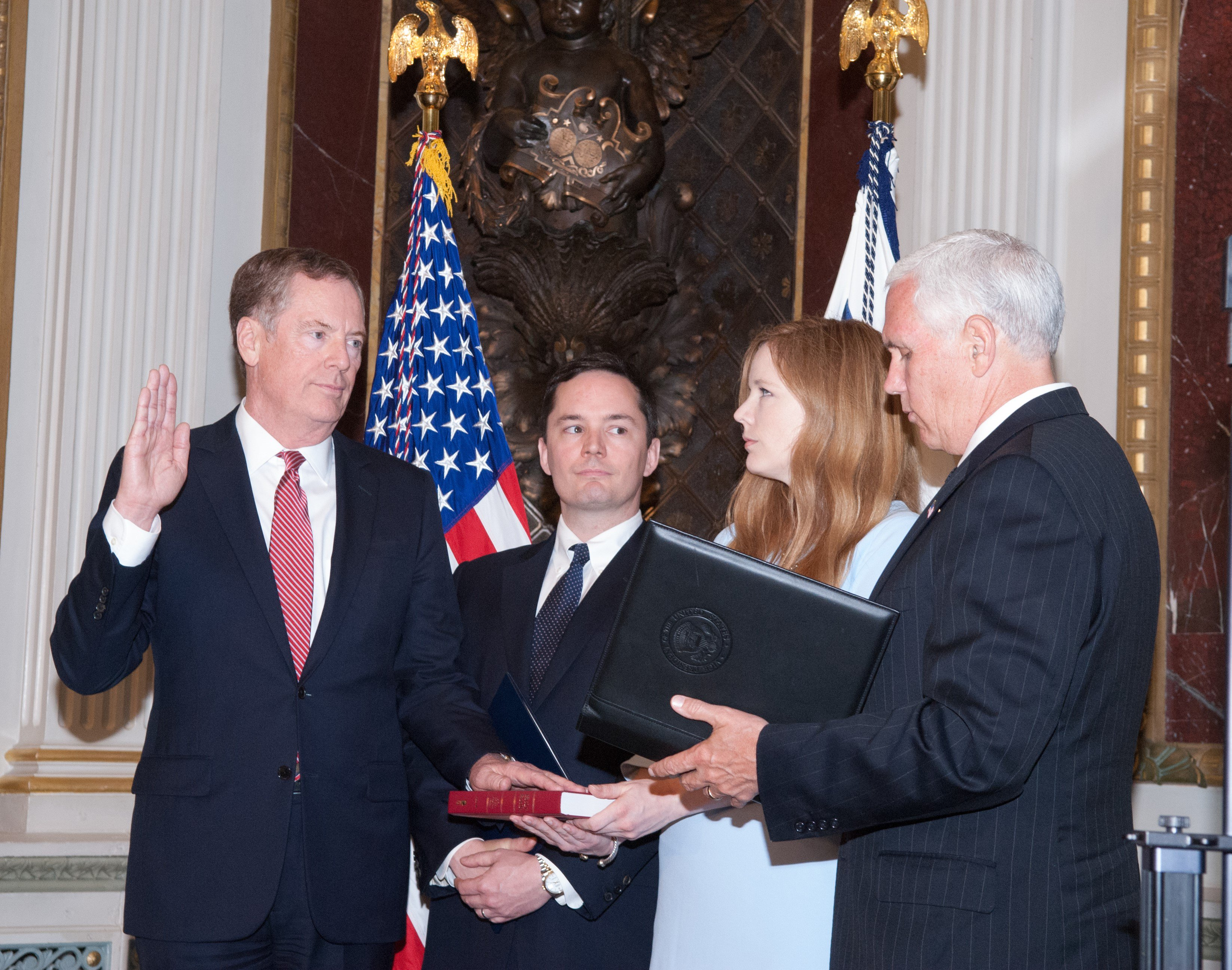
Lighthizer is sworn in as Trade Representative by Vice President Mike Pence in May 2017

On January 3, 2017, Donald Trump announced that he planned to nominate Lighthizer as U.S. Trade Representative, a cabinet-level position. On January 23, press reports speculated that Lighthizer's nomination might require a waiver of section 141(b)(4) of the Trade Act of 1974, as amended, due to his brief representation of a foreign government in litigation 25 years prior. In March, White House Counsel Donald McGahn sent a letter to Senate leadership citing a Clinton-era opinion by the White House Counsel arguing that the statute was an unconstitutional limit on the president's ability to appoint his cabinet.

At his confirmation hearing, Lighthizer was introduced by former senator Bob Dole and U.S. senators from Ohio Sherrod Brown and Rob Portman. In introducing Lighthizer, Brown said, "Mr. Lighthizer is eminently qualified, as Senator Dole said, for this job. He has a long history of fighting on behalf of American manufacturers, and I would add, American workers."

On April 25, the Senate Finance Committee unanimously approved Lighthizer's nomination to serve as the U.S. Trade Representative as well as a waiver of section 141(b)(4) of the Trade Act of 1974. Lighthizer was confirmed as the 18th U.S. Trade Representative on May 11, 2017, by a margin of 82–14. He was sworn in by Vice President Mike Pence on May 15, 2017.

Three days later, on May 18, Lighthizer notified Congress that President Trump intended to renegotiate the North American Free Trade Agreement (NAFTA), which would make him the first USTR to renegotiate a major U.S. free trade agreement.

According to multiple reports, Lighthizer became one of the most influential Trump administration officials and the lead figure in formulating the administration's trade policy. The reports noted his agreement with Trump on trade issues. Lighthizer played a key role in the administration's renegotiation of NAFTA and the United States' trade war with China.

== Policy views ==
=== Tariffs ===
Lighthizer has stated that using tariffs to promote American industry was a Republican tenet dating back to the pro-business politicians who established the party. He has called for a "new American System" of trade policy that uses tariffs to offset the United States's trade deficit and restore the manufacturing sector in the United States. In a 2008 op-ed, he also defended protectionism.

=== Trade agreements ===
Lighthizer believes that a good trade agreement must "strike a balance among economic security, economic efficiency, and the needs of working people", and he described the U.S.-Mexico-Canada Agreement he negotiated the "model deal." Speaking at a July 2020 event at Chatham House, Lighthizer stated that bilateral trade agreements and a multilateral system conflict with each other, and that one of those two options should be chosen over the other.

=== Trade with China ===
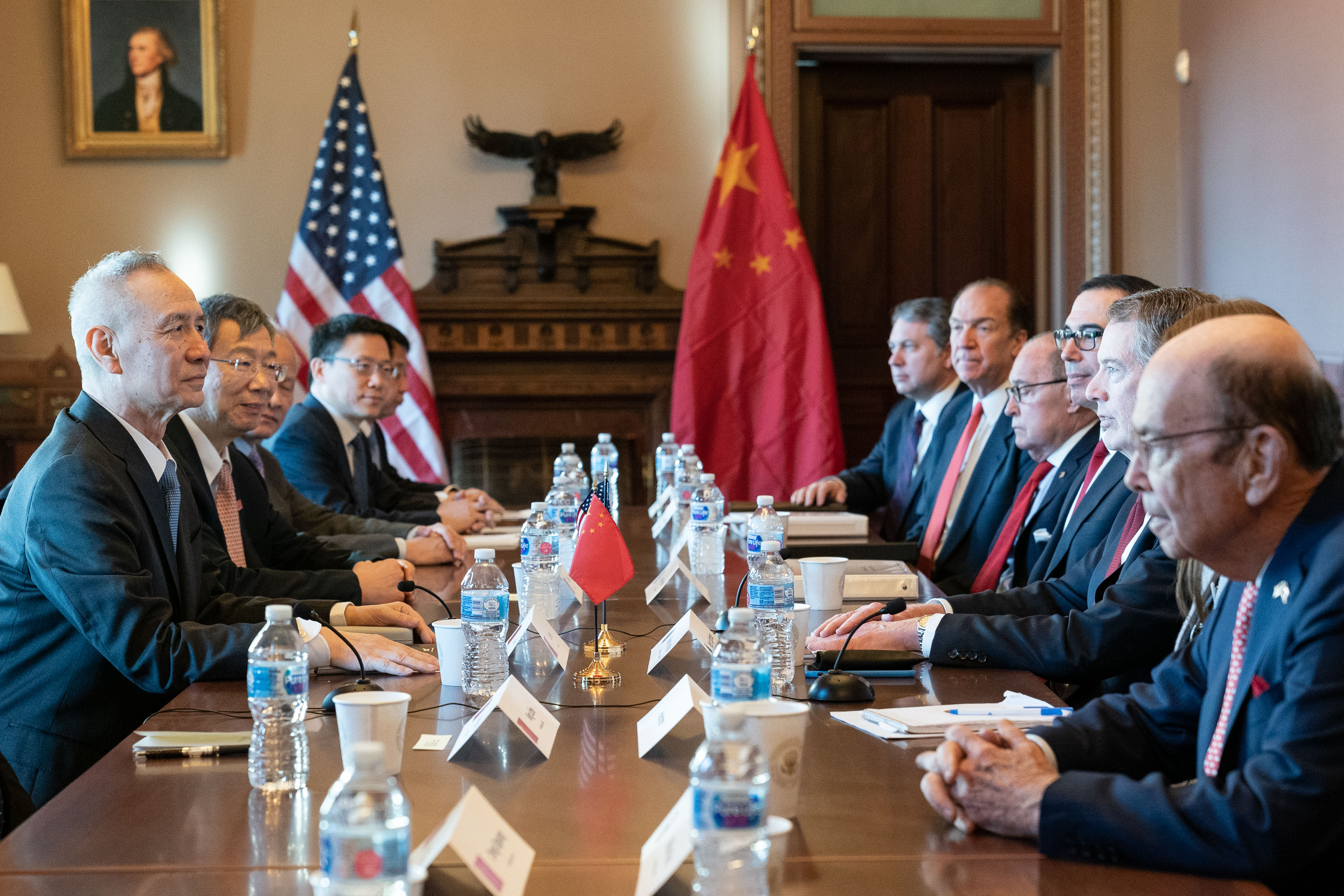
Lighthizer with Chinese Vice Premier Liu He in January 2019

Politico describes Lighthizer as "a decades-long skeptic of Beijing". Lighthizer has accused the country of China of unfair trade practices, and he believes China needs to make substantive and structural changes to its trade policies, as opposed to only minor changes it has offered in the past. He wrote, "The icon of modern conservatism, Ronald Reagan, imposed quotas on imported steel, protected Harley-Davidson from Japanese competition, restrained import of semiconductors and automobiles, and took myriad similar steps to keep American industry strong. How does allowing China to constantly rig trade in its favor advance the core conservative goal of making markets more efficient? Markets do not run better when manufacturing shifts to China largely because of the actions of its government."

In a 1997 op-ed in The New York Times, Lighthizer advocated against allowing China to join the World Trade Organization. He suggested that the U.S. should bring more cases against China for failure to comply with the regulations of the World Trade Organization. In testimony before the US-China Economic and Security Review Commission in 2010, Lighthizer said that "USTR (U.S. Trade Representative) should pursue WTO litigation with respect to all such examples of non-compliance. If necessary, Congress should give USTR additional resources to increase its ability." Lighthizer called for reforming the WTO during a testimony to Congress on June 17, 2020.

=== Trade with India ===
In 2023, Lighthizer wrote in his book No Trade is Free that, "fifteen or so billionaires" shaped India's trading policy. Terming them as "oligarchs", Lighthizer added India is "the most protectionist country in the world".

=== Domestic manufacturing ===
In March 2020, Lighthizer stated that the COVID-19 pandemic has shown that the United States must promote domestic manufacturing of medical supplies and reduce its reliance on foreign countries.

== Personal life ==
Lighthizer lives in Florida. His wife, Cathy, died in 2014. He has two children, Robert and Claire, and three grandchildren.

Lighthizer's brother, O. James Lighthizer, is an American Civil War expert. James Lighthizer was the president of the American Battlefield Trust, a battlefield preservation organization, and a former member of the Maryland House of Delegates.

Political offices
Preceded by Michael Froman	United States Trade Representative; 2017–2021	Succeeded by Katherine Tai
