= Joseph Barloon =

American trade official

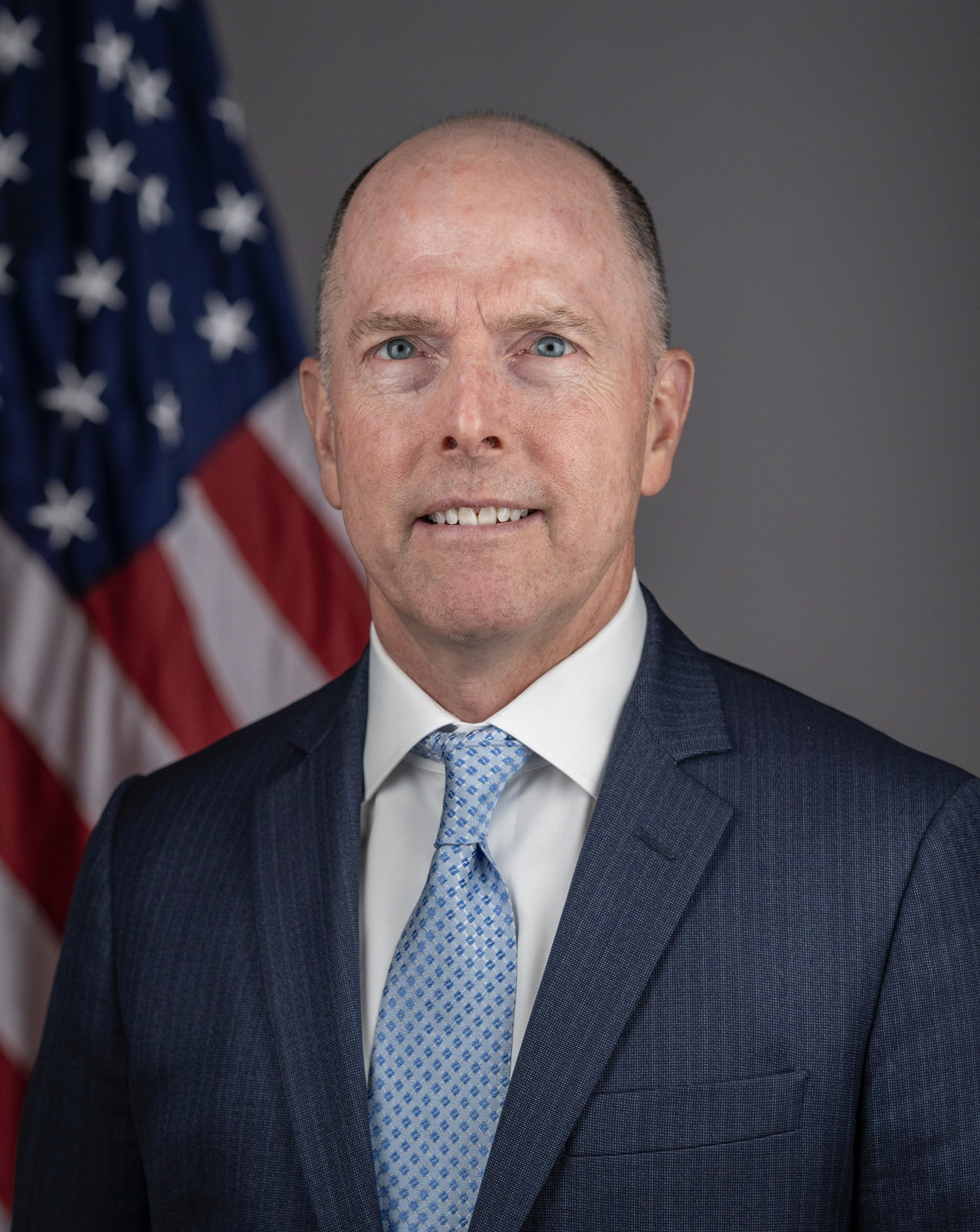
- Official portrait, 2025

United States Deputy Trade Representative
- Incumbent
- Assumed office October 14, 2025
- President: Donald Trump
- Preceded by: Maria Pagan
- In office August 2020 – January 2021; Acting
- President: Donald Trump

Personal details
- Born: Joseph Leo Barloon; 1967 (age 58–59)
- Education: Harvard University (BA); University of Pennsylvania (MA); Georgetown University (JD)

Joseph Leo Barloon (born 1967) is an American lawyer who is the United States Deputy Trade Representative since October 2025, having previously acted in the position from 2020 to 2021.

== Education ==
Barloon attended Rockhurst High School in Kansas City, Missouri. He graduated cum laude from Harvard University in 1989 and obtained an MA from the University of Pennsylvania. He graduated summa cum laude from Georgetown University Law Center in 1996.

== Career ==
Barloon clerked for Judge Douglas H. Ginsburg at the United States Court of Appeals for the District of Columbia Circuit from 1996 to 1997.

He was General Counsel to the United States Trade Representative from 2019 to 2021, and acting United States Deputy Trade Representative from 2020 to 2021. He was nominated by President Donald Trump as a judge on the United States Court of International Trade in November 2020, but his nomination was withdrawn by President Joe Biden in January 2021.

Barloon was nominated by Trump to be United States Deputy Trade Representative in February 2025 and was confirmed by a 51–47 party-line vote in the Senate on October 7, 2025.

== See also ==
- Political appointments of the second Trump administration
