= Maibach =

Maibach may refer to:

== Places ==
- Maibach (Poppenhausen), a locality of Poppenhausen, in Bavaria, Germany
- Maibach (Butzbach), a borough of Butzbach, in Hesse, Germany

== People with the surname ==
- Howard Maibach (born 1929), American dermatologist
- Edward Maibach, an expert in public health and climate change communication

== Other uses ==
- Maibach (Axtbach), a river of North Rhine-Westphalia, Germany

== See also ==
- Maybach
