= Tightwad Hill =

Landform of the San Francisco Bay Area

- Location within San Francisco Bay Area

Highest point
- Coordinates: 37°52′21″N 122°15′03″W

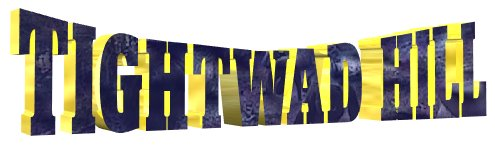
The Tightwad Hill logo

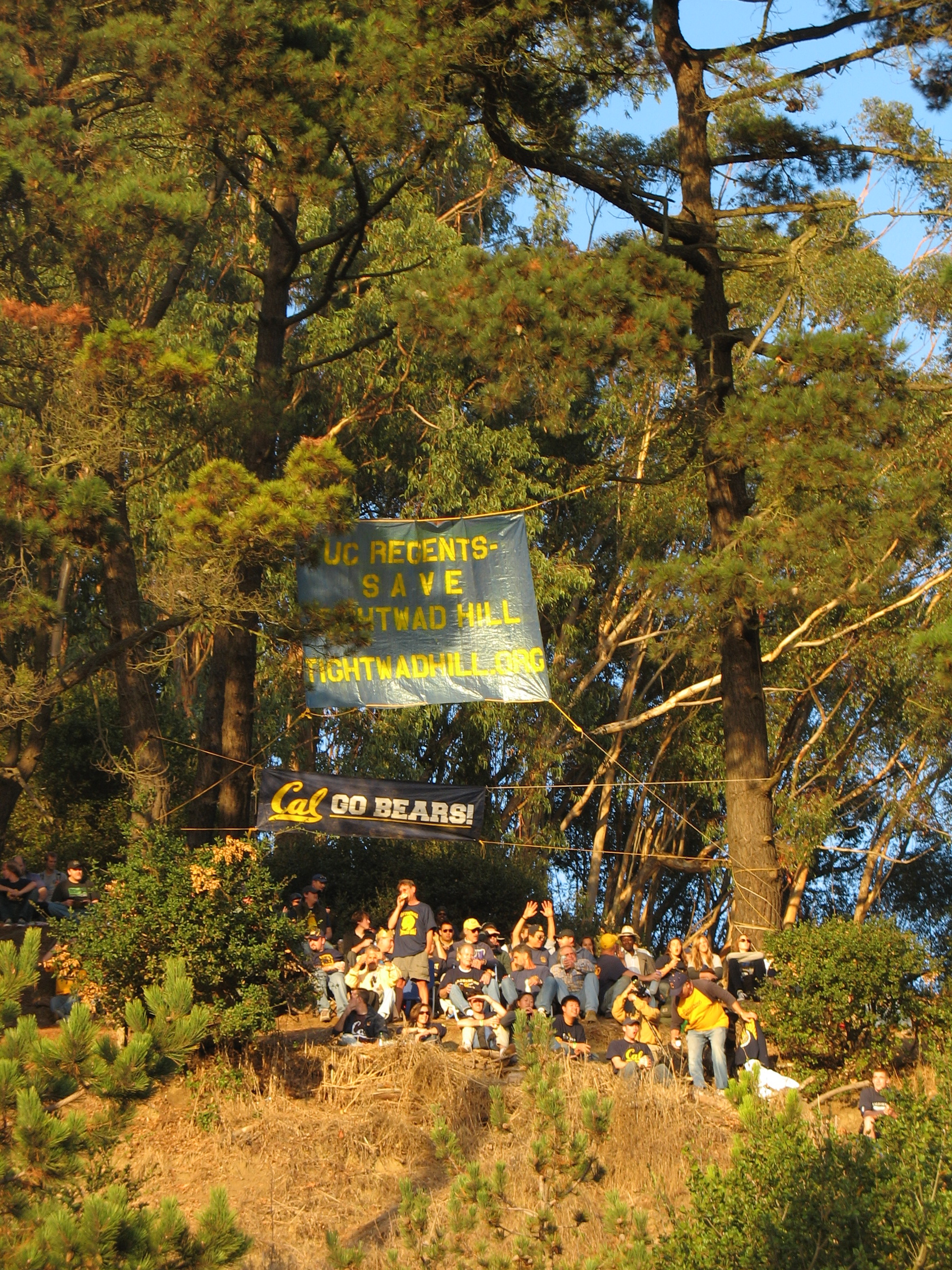
November 4, 2006, Cal Bears vs. UCLA

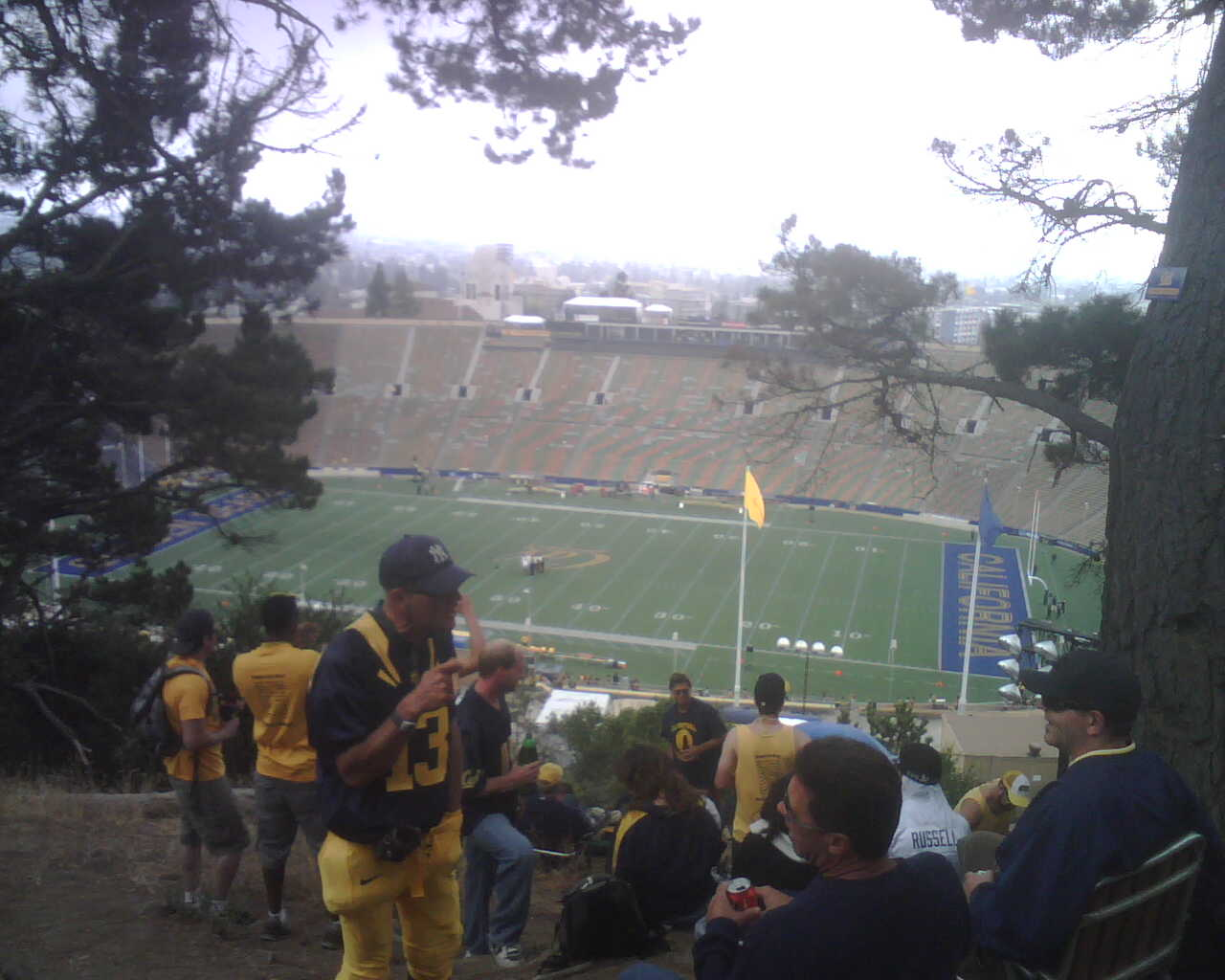
The view from Tightwad Hill before the home opener against Maryland on September 5, 2009

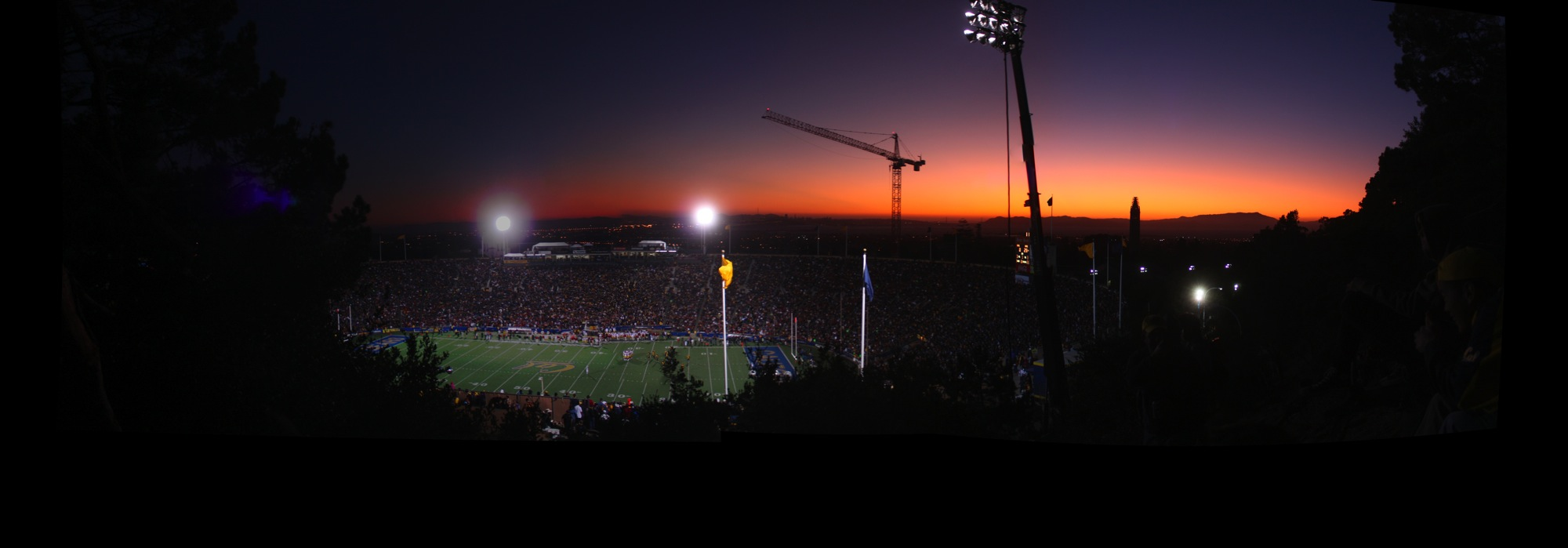
Panoramic view from Tightwad Hill at sunset showing a game against USC.

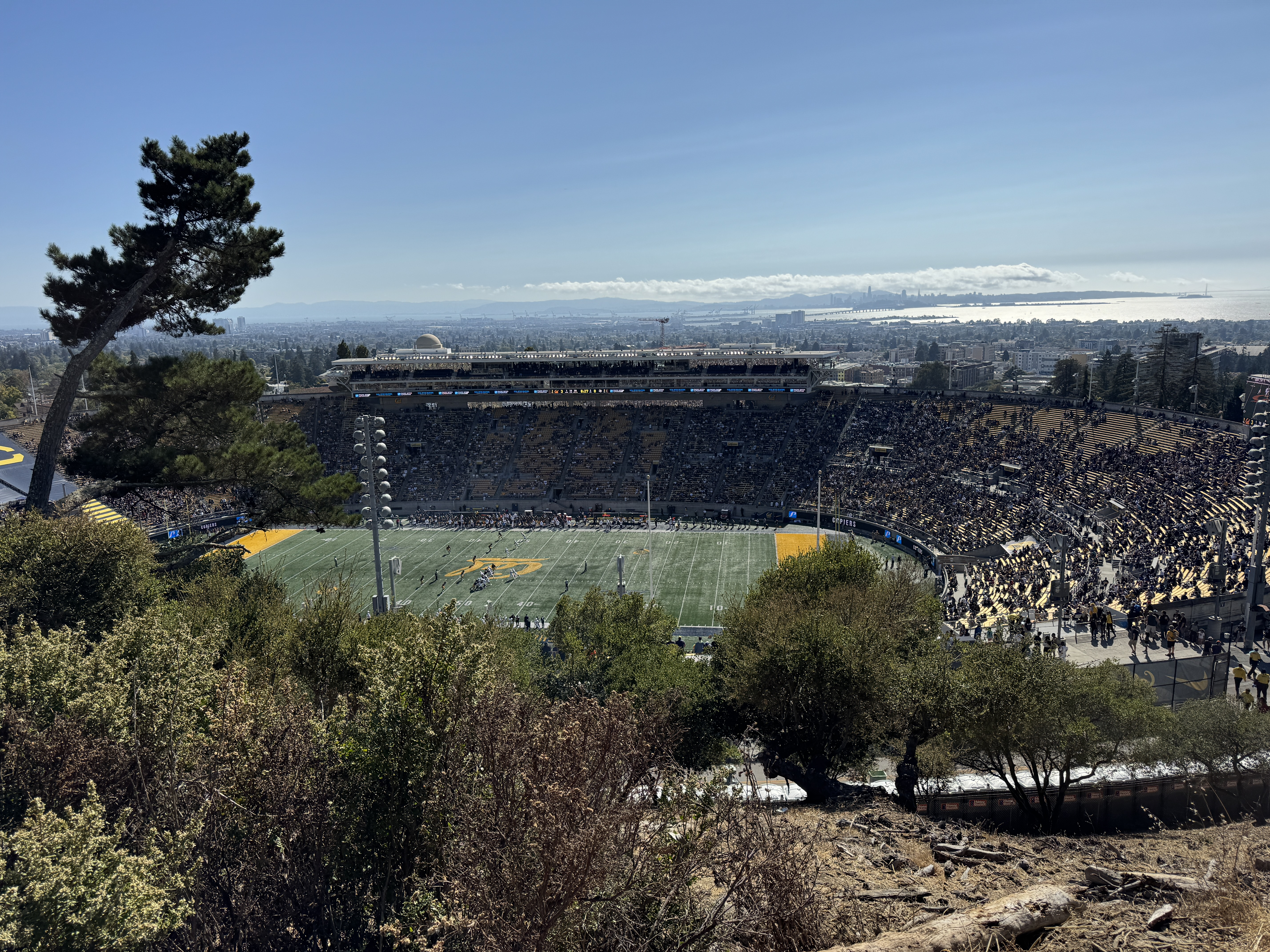
2025 View from Tightwad Hill showing California Memorial Stadium, San Francisco & Alcatraz Island in the Background

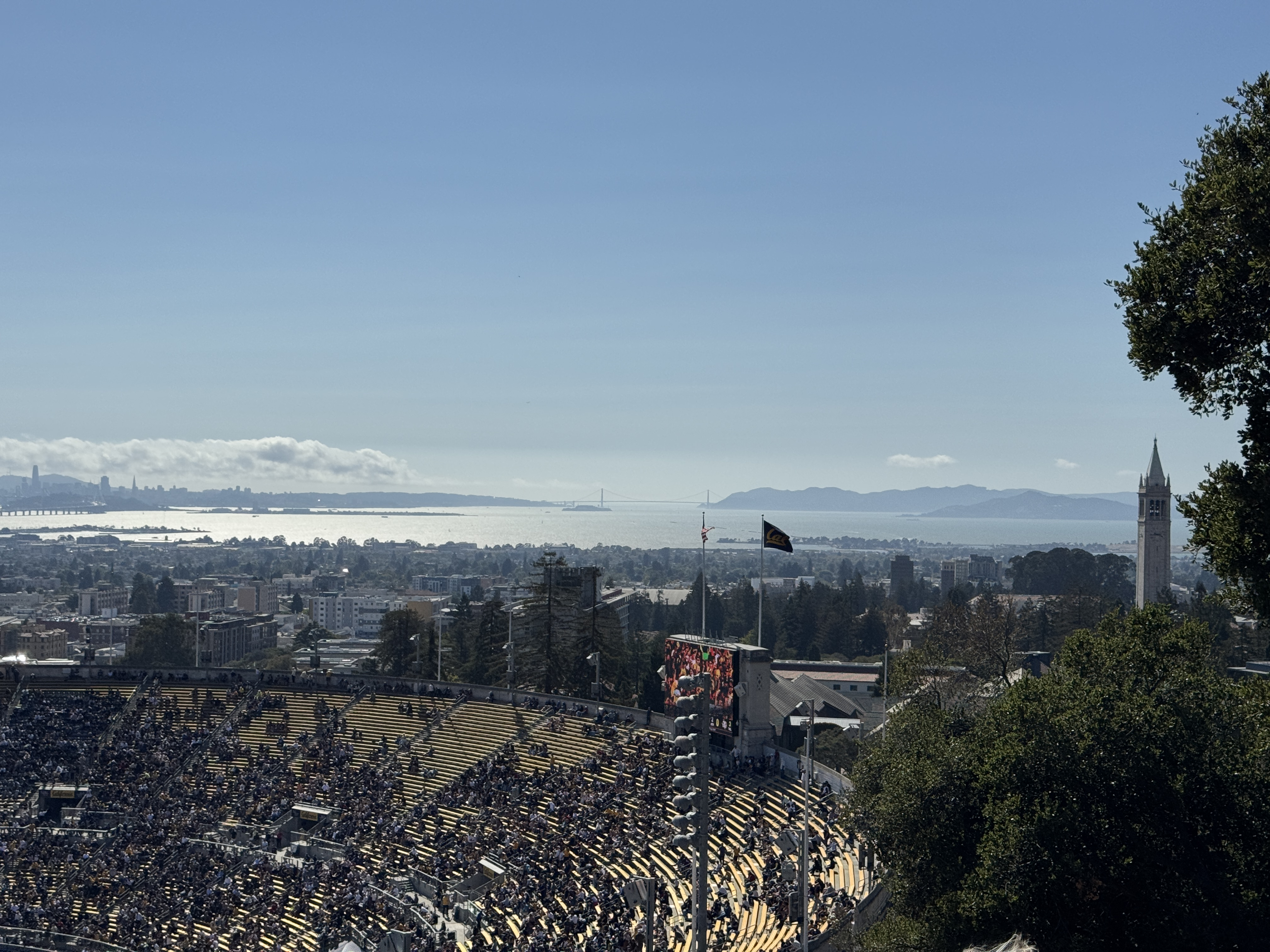
2025 View from Tightwad Hill showing California Memorial Stadium, the Golden Gate Bridge & UC Berkeley’s Sather Tower in the Background

Tightwad Hill is the popular name for Charter Hill, the hill rising to the east of California Memorial Stadium at the University of California, Berkeley in Berkeley, California, U.S.

== History ==
Tightwad Hill is so named as it affords a free view of the stadium's field, allowing fans of the Golden Bears to see the game for free. The hill usually has its occupants, even when the stadium sports empty seats. Tightwad Hill is part of Charter Hill, the area behind campus that also encompasses the Big "C", a large concrete letter "C" in the hillside.

Tightwad Hill rises steeply about 100 feet above the east rim of the stadium, to a relatively flat area where spectators perch. Created when Memorial Stadium was built in 1923, Tightwad Hill was created from the dirt removed during the excavation of lower Strawberry Canyon. The first time fans were seen on the hill for Cal games was on November 24, 1923, during the inaugural game at California Memorial Stadium, which Cal won by a final score of 9–0, beating Stanford for the fifth straight year and securing their fourth straight undefeated season. Due to the stadium being sold out for the game, fans and students made their way up to the hill that had been created above the east rim of the stadium.

Since then, U.C. Berkeley students, staff, faculty, and the public have enjoyed fall days on the hill, cheering for the Golden Bears and enjoying the view of the U.C. campus, downtown Berkeley, and the central San Francisco Bay.

There are and have been many unique features on the hill over the years. Some of those items and areas include or included:

- A bench that was built in a tree over 20 years ago. Another tree fell into it during the winter of 2013/2014 and, along with other trees affected by old age and storms, the bench was cut down the week prior to the 2014 home opener. Parts of the bench, though, have been saved for future use somewhere in the main seating area of the Hill.
- Trash cans and recycling bins to help keep the hill looking spotless following games
- Terraces formed into the steep hillside to facilitate seating
- "The Tightwad 50 Club", which is the seating area below where the Tightwad Hill sign once hung from
- "The Pit", which is an area filled with broken glass below the lowest seating area on the main part of the Hill
- A bench that was once below The 50 Club, which was in place from 2004 to 2008. It was followed by an improved version that was used for one season in 2014 before it was destroyed by drunk frat boys during the following offseason

In 2006, the Regents of the University of California began considering a major renovation of Memorial Stadium. One plan proposed the construction of a new seating structure, the so-called "Eastside Seating Structure" on the promenade on the east side of the stadium. If this were to be built, it could block views of the field from Tightwad Hill, possibly eliminating this unusual and colorful tradition. An organization called "Save Tightwad Hill" sued the university, claiming that the Environmental Impact Report for the stadium project did not adequately analyze the impacts of the planned improvements on historic resources and scenic views. The group eventually settled with the university. Under the terms of the agreement the university agreed in concept to preserve Tightwad Hill as an important Cal football tradition, and to include representatives of Tightwad Hill in the design process for east side improvements.

Tightwad Hill became the sponsor of The Bear Raid podcast on November 15, 2020, the same date as the debut of the show. The long-term goal of the podcast, currently hosted by three members of The Hill (two of which are current and former "Governors of Tightwad") is to cover all of the Cal athletic programs.

== California Victory Cannon ==
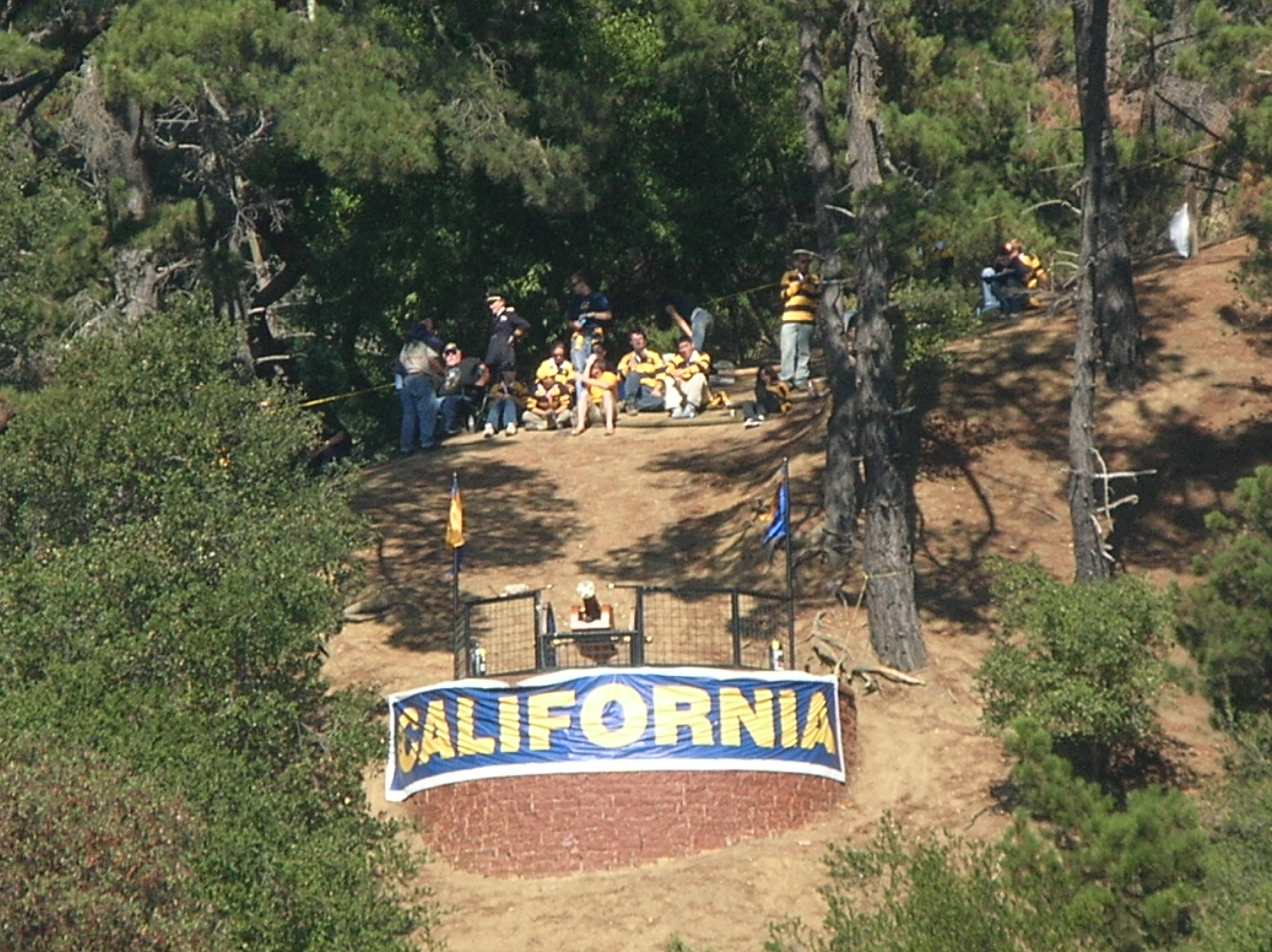
The Victory Cannon at an October 2008 game against UCLA.

To the right of the fans on the hill is the platform for the California Victory Cannon. Constructed in 2004 to serve as a replacement for the old wooden cannon platform, the concrete and stone structure was paid for through a 2003 donation campaign spearheaded by current and former UC Cannoneers, the keepers and operators of the cannon. This permanent structure debuted during the 2004 season as the new perch for the Victory Cannon. At every home game, rain or shine, the cannon is loaded and shot at each of the football team's run-outs, whenever Cal scores a touchdown, and when a Cal victory goes final. The resulting boom is heard throughout the stadium and the surrounding area, and has come to be known as "Oski's Mighty Thunder."

Starting at the Big Game of 1963, the California Victory Cannon was traditionally brought by members of the UC Rally Committee to be fired inside the stadium. When the old Pac-8 Conference banned cannons from stadiums in 1972, all other Pac-8 schools abandoned their cannons; Cal, however, maintained the tradition as the hill behind the stadium was ruled to be outside the zone governed by the ban. Since 1972, the Victory Cannon has been fired from outside of Memorial Stadium to the delight of fans on and off Tightwad Hill. The cannon has only once run out of ammunition, in a 1991 home game against Pacific where Cal scored 12 touchdowns.

In addition to being fired at all Cal home games, the cannon has traveled to bowl games, such as the Holiday and Copper Bowls, as well as to away games against Washington and Indiana, even having a stand-in from the Australian town of Wagga Wagga brought to Cal's victory over the Hawaii Rainbow Warriors at the College Football Sydney Cup, the opening game of the 2016 season, in Australia's national stadium ANZ Stadium.
