= Beilbach =

River in Germany

Location
- Country: Germany
- State: North Rhine-Westphalia

Physical characteristics
- Mouth
  - location: Axtbach
  - coordinates: 51°55′44″N 08°06′20″E
- Length: 17.1 km (10.6 mi)

Basin features
- Progression: Axtbach→ Ems→ North Sea

Beilbach is a river of North Rhine-Westphalia, Germany. It flows into the Axtbach in Beelen.

== See also ==
- List of rivers of North Rhine-Westphalia
