= Epworth League =

Methodist young adult association

Founded in 1889, the Epworth League is a Methodist young adult association for people aged 18 to 35. It had its beginning in Cleveland, Ohio, at its Central Methodist Church on May 14 and 15, 1889. There was also a Colored Epworth League.

Before then, as many as five young people's organizations existed in the Methodist Episcopal church, such as the Methodist Alliance, claiming 20,000 members in 1883; the Oxford League, organized at the Methodist Centennial Conference with a large chapter at Central Methodist Church; and the Young People's Christian League.

After discussions of a merger into a single body, 27 people gathered at Central Methodist to form the Epworth League and adopted a modified version of the constitution of the Oxford League and the motto of the Young People's Christian League, "Look Up, Lift Up." The league, which soon spread worldwide, divided its social service into six departments: Spiritual Life, Social Work, Literary Work, Correspondence, Mercy and Help, and Finance. Local chapters organized Fresh Air Work (day camps for city children), literary events, lecture series, and fellowship gatherings.

At its conception, the purpose of the League was the promotion of intelligent and vital piety among the young people of the Church:

To encourage and cultivate Christ-centered character in young adults around the world through community building, missions, and spiritual growth.

The League takes its name from the village of Epworth in Lincolnshire, England, the birthplace of John Wesley and Charles Wesley. Its members are known as Epworthians.

== Historical growth ==
Within 10 years of its founding, the League claimed over 1.75 million members in 19,500 chapters internationally. The League existed in both the Northern and Southern branches of the Methodist Episcopal denomination and also in the Methodist Church of Canada. The headquarters of the Northern League was in Chicago and its organ was the Epworth Herald. The organ of the Southern branch was the Epworth Era, published monthly at Nashville, Tenn.

The membership of the Senior branch in the Methodist Episcopal Church North in 1913 was 593,465, and of the junior branch 218,509. In the Methodist Episcopal Church, South there were 3846 chapters of the league, with 133,797 members.

== Modern era ==
The original Epworth League existed from 1889 to 1939. After denominational mergers among Methodists in the 1930s, the Epworth League became known as the Methodist Youth Fellowship; it survived in 1994 as the United Methodist Youth Fellowship.

== Publications ==
- Bacon and Northrup, Young People's Societies (New York, 1900)
- The Methodist Year Book
- Dan B. Brummett, Epworth League Methods (New York, 1906)

== In popular culture ==
- In The Music Man, set in 1912 Iowa, teenager Zaneeta Shinn declines a date because "it's Epworth League night".
- In All the King's Men, by Robert Penn Warren, the protagonist describes the blandness of the column he is hired to write by reference to the Epworth League.
- In Against the Day by Thomas Pynchon, a saucy secretary tells St. Cosmo, who has entered the office after-hours, that "'this [place] ain't the Epworth League.'"
- In Sherwood Anderson's short story/Winesburg, Ohio piece titled "Adventure," the self-stifled heroine Alice, "who could not have understood the growing modern idea of a woman's owning herself and giving and taking for her own ends in life," joins the Winesburg Methodist Church and every "Sunday evening attended a meeting of an organization called The Epworth League."
- In Dawn Powell's 1944 novel, My Home is Far Away, Epworth League meetings are one of the few social gatherings deemed acceptable for the main character, an adolescent girl, and her two sisters.
- In the 1934 W. C. Fields movie It's a Gift, when Amelia Bissonette tells her husband Harold that his Uncle Bean has died, she says, "It seemed he was getting better, but he attended the Epworth League picnic, and he choked to death eating an orange."
- In Across the River and into the Trees, by Ernest Hemingway, the colonel describes General Eisenhower as "strictly the Epworth League."
- In The Chill by Ross Macdonald, drunken Bridget Perrine bids farewell to Lew Archer with "See you at the Epworth League."
- "That remark of yours was pos'tively Epworth Leaguish." Philo Vance, in The Benson Murder Case, by S. S. VanDine.
- In The League of Frightened Men, by Rex Stout, Archie Goodwin remarks "I’m just waiting to see you and Nero Wolfe and the Epworth League prove it on him."

== See also ==
- Waukee United Methodist Church
- Hamilton v. Regents of the University of California
