= Hamilton v. Regents of the University of California =

- Supreme Court of the United States

Argued October 17–18, 1934 Decided December 3, 1934
- Full case name: Hamilton, et al. v. Regents of the University of California, et al.
- Citations: 293 U.S. 245 (more) 55 S.Ct. 197; 79 L. Ed. 343; 1934 U.S. LEXIS 26

Case history
- Subsequent: rehearing denied, 293 U.S. 633, 55 S.Ct. 345, 79 L.Ed. —

Holding
- That an order of the regents requiring students at its University to take a course in military science and tactics is a statute of the State of California; that each state has authority to train its able-bodied male citizens of suitable age to fit them, if called upon, for service in the United States Army, the state militia, or the local constabulary or police; that such an order is not repugnant to the due process clause of the Fourteenth Amendment as an undue deprivation of liberty; and that such an order does not violate the privilege and immunities clause.

Court membership
- Chief Justice Charles E. Hughes Associate Justices Willis Van Devanter · James C. McReynolds; Louis Brandeis · George Sutherland; Pierce Butler · Harlan F. Stone; Owen Roberts · Benjamin N. Cardozo

Case opinion
- Majority: Butler, joined by unanimous

Hamilton v. Regents of the University of California, 293 U.S. 245 (1934), is a United States Supreme Court case in which the Court upheld the "right of California to force its university students to take classes in military training" and reiterated that "[i]nstruction in military science is not instruction in the practice or tenets of a religion." It was also held that the University of California constituted a corporation created by the state to administer the University, its president, and its provost, and as held is a constitutional department or function of the state government and as such an order by the regents is in effect a statute or law of the state.

== Background ==
On March 23, 1868, the California State Legislature passed the Organic Act creating the University "in order to devote to the largest purposes of education the benefaction made to the State" by the Morrill Land-Grant Colleges Act. The act stated:

[I]n order to fulfil the requirements of the said Act of Congress, all able-bodied male students of the University, whether pursuing full or partial courses in any college, or as students at large, shall receive instruction and discipline in military tactics in such manner and to such extent as the Regents shall prescribe, the requisite arms for which shall be furnished by the State.

On September 15, 1931, the Board of Regents promulgated an order requiring students to take the course in military science and tactics in the Reserve Officers Training Corps as prescribed by the War Department. The order prescribed the following:

Every able-bodied student of the University of California who, at the time of his matriculation at the University, is under the age of twenty-four years and a citizen of the United States and who has not attained full academic standing as a junior student in the University and has not completed the course in military science and tactics offered to freshmen and sophomore students at the University shall be and is hereby required as a condition to his attendance as a student to enroll in and complete a course in not less than one and one-half units of instruction in military science and tactics each semester of his attendance until such time as he shall have received a total of six units of such instruction or shall have attained full academic standing as a junior student.

In October, 1933, several minors belonging to the Methodist Episcopal Church and of the Epworth League enrolled in the University of California system. The students at the beginning of the fall term in 1933 petitioned the University for exemption from military training and participation in the activities of the training corps, upon the ground of their religious and conscientious objection to war and to military training. The regents refused to make military training optional or to exempt these students.
