= William Coblentz (attorney) =

American attorney

William Kraemer Coblentz [KAHB-lenz] (July 28, 1922 – September 13, 2010) was an American attorney and behind-the-scenes power broker who played an important role in California politics in the years after World War II, serving as a Regent of the University of California and legal representative for the rock bands Jefferson Airplane and the Grateful Dead, as well as for socialite, kidnapping victim and convicted bank robber Patty Hearst.

== Early life and education ==
Coblentz was born on July 28, 1922, in Santa Maria, California, and attended San Francisco's Lowell High School. He earned his undergraduate degree from the University of California, Berkeley where he majored in economics. He served with the United States Army Corps of Engineers in the South during World War II and earned his law degree from Yale Law School in 1947 after completing his military service. He returned to California to practice law and became involved in state and local politics as a Democrat.

== Career in law and politics ==
Coblentz became an assistant to Pat Brown when he was California's Attorney General and moved up with him when Brown became Governor of California. After an initial offer to serve as a judge, Coblentz accepted an offer from Brown in 1964 for a 16-year term on the University of California Board of Regents as Coblentz had requested, during which he served as the board's chairman from 1978 to 1980. A member of San Francisco's Bohemian Club, Coblentz was part of the group that supported Joseph Alioto in 1967 in his successful run for mayor of San Francisco. In his bid for Governor of California, Ronald Reagan used the University of California as a campaign issue, citing what he saw as a "spirit of permissiveness" that led to student disturbances. Coblentz defended the university's faculty, including such radicals as Eldridge Cleaver and Angela Davis, calling Reagan "a menopausal Cary Grant".

As a regent, Coblentz played a key role in supporting efforts to pursue the case Regents of the University of California v. Bakke to the Supreme Court of the United States. The court ruled in 1978 in favor of Allan Bakke, a Caucasian student who had been bypassed for a spot at the UC Davis School of Medicine, concluding that racial quotas were illegal but ruling that race could be used as part of the consideration process. Despite the mixed ruling, Coblentz insisted that the support for the case by the regents helped send a message that the University of California cared about providing educational opportunities for minority students. After Coblentz's term as regent ended in 1980, Reagan left a video message that said "Let bygones be bygones. If you support me, I may make you the next ambassador to Afghanistan."

Through concert promoter Bill Graham, Coblentz became the legal representative for Jefferson Airplane and the Grateful Dead. Coblentz recalled being invited to a dinner hosted by members of Jefferson Airplane where two joints were arranged next to each place setting. Coblentz managed the group's bank account, providing cash for Grace Slick to buy a Mercedes-Benz that she totalled two days later. After efforts were made to block performances by the Grateful Dead at Fillmore West citing concerns that the auditorium posed a blight on a fine neighborhood, Coblentz arranged for a friend to observe a hotel across the street from the Fillmore used for prostitution and had photographs taken of police officers which were passed on to the Board of Permit Appeals, which decided in the end to approve the project.

After Patty Hearst was kidnapped by the Symbionese Liberation Army in 1974, Coblentz was hired by the Hearst family as an attorney, based on his relationship with fellow regent Catherine Hearst, Patty's mother. As part of one of the group's demands, Coblentz arranged for the distribution of $2 million in free food to be distributed to poor residents of San Francisco. Coblentz's legal services were offered to captured SLA members charged with murder, but were rejected when the radicals chose to be represented by public defenders, with Coblentz noting that "They didn't like us, we didn't like them, but they were entitled, as we say, to their day in court."

As an adviser to Dianne Feinstein when she was mayor of San Francisco, he was appointed as a member of the San Francisco Airport Commission for 16 years, where he advocated for the availability of free luggage carts and had a boarding area in the airport named in his honor. As an attorney, Coblentz was a land use lawyer who assisted in getting the necessary approvals for a new baseball stadium for the San Francisco Giants, as well as for Mission Bay and Yerba Buena Gardens. A longtime supporter of the NAACP Legal Defense and Educational Fund, Coblentz's partners at the law firm of Coblentz, Patch, Duffy & Bass recognized him by endowing the Coblentz Fellowship for Civil Rights at the UC Berkeley School of Law, which provides fellowships to students pursuing civil rights and racial justice.

He was elected in 2002 as a Fellow of the American Academy of Arts and Sciences.

Coblentz died at age 88 on September 13, 2010. He was survived by his wife, the former Jean Berlin, as well as by a daughter, a son, and four grandchildren.
