= Waukee United Methodist Church =

Coordinates: 41.612127°N 93.886703°W

Founded in 1869, the Waukee United Methodist Church is one of the oldest churches in Waukee, Iowa.

== History ==
The church first met in the Des Moines Valley rail depot. Under the name of First Methodist Episcopal Church of Waukee, the church moved into its own building in 1878, shortly before the town incorporated.

=== Buildings ===
- 1877: An unfinished church was bought and completed in 1878.
- 1900: A new church was built on the existing foundation using material from the old church.
- 1953: An educational unit was added to the church.
- 1978: A new building was completed adjacent to the old building.
- 2006: New land was purchased along LA Grant Parkway.
- 2023: A new ministry facility was completed on LA Grant Parkway.

=== Stained Glass Windows ===
In 1900 four stained glassed windows were given to the church as a memorial. In 1901 a cathedral window was presented to the church by the Epworth League, and in on completion of a league room in 1914 a memorial window showing Jesus in the Garden of Gethsemane was installed.

All the stained glass windows are now located in the sanctuary of the current church. However, the four windows donated in 1900 were stored in a corncrib for 16 years by a church trustee until a renovation in 1995.

== The church today ==
Led by Reverend John Louk since 2021, the church is growing in its new ministry center and new location on LA Grant Parkway. The congregation gathers weekly for worship and small groups, offers outreach events for the community such as Trunk or Treat and the Gingerbread House Decorating Party, and provides mission such as The Table and Change A Child's Story. The congregation also participates in the local Waukee Area Christian Food Pantry. The church is a member of the Iowa Annual Conference of The United Methodist Church.
