= Regents of the University of California =

Governing board of the University of California

Governing board overview
- Formed: June 18, 1868
- Type: State university system governing board
- Jurisdiction: University of California system
- Headquarters: Oakland, California, United States
- Annual budget: $53.6 billion (2024–2025)
- Governing board executives: Gavin Newsom, Governor of California and President; Janet Reilly, Chair; Maria Anguiano, Vice chair
- Website: regents.universityofcalifornia.edu

The Regents of the University of California (also referred to as the Board of Regents to distinguish the board from the corporation it governs of the same name) is the governing board of the University of California (UC), a public state university system in the U.S. state of California. The Board of Regents has 26 voting members, the majority of whom are appointed by the governor of California to serve 12-year terms.

The regents establish university policy; make decisions that determine student cost of attendance, admissions, employee compensation, and land management; and perform long-range planning for all UC campuses and locations. The regents also control the investment of UC's endowment, and they supervise the making of contracts between UC and private companies.

The structure and composition of the Board of Regents is laid out in the Constitution of California, which establishes that the University of California is a "public trust" and that the regents are a "corporation" that has been granted the power to manage the trust on the public's behalf. The constitution grants the regents broad institutional autonomy, giving them "full powers of organization and government." According to article IX, section 9, subsection (a), "the regents are "subject only to such legislative control as may be necessary to insure the security of its funds and compliance with the terms of the endowments of the university".

== History ==
Section 11 of the Organic Act establishing the University of California begins with the following sentence: "The general government and superintendence of the University shall vest in a Board of Regents, to be denominated the 'Regents of the University of California,' who shall become incorporated under the general laws of the State of California by that corporate name and style."

The Organic Act described three groups of regents: six ex officio regents, eight appointed regents, and eight "honorary" regents. To expedite the formation of the university, the Organic Act authorized the governor to unilaterally select the eight appointed regents after the end of the current legislative session and allowed them to assume office immediately without the consent of the state senate. Governor Henry Huntly Haight announced his selections in May 1868. On May 23, a notice was published in the San Francisco Examiner of a meeting of the regents scheduled for May 28, but no record was made of this meeting. On June 9, 1868, the first two groups of regents gathered together in San Francisco for the first recorded meeting of the Board of Regents, where the appointed regents drew lots to determine the lengths of their initial terms, and then the board proceeded to elect the eight honorary regents. The "honorary" regents enjoyed the same authority and privileges as the first two groups of regents; the term "honorary" referred only to their method of selection.

As required by Section 11, the Board of Regents proceeded to form a corporation denominated the Regents of the University of California on June 12, 1868, and filed the certificate of incorporation on June 18, 1868, with the California secretary of state. The corporation's official name today is still the Regents of the University of California. Today, it is unusual for universities (or any other kind of corporation) to incorporate in the names of their boards, but it used to be a common practice among American universities. For example, Harvard University is still legally incorporated as the President and Fellows of Harvard College.

Incorporating the university under the exact same name as its board was just as confusing in the 19th century as it is today. In an 1894 wrongful death case, the plaintiffs did not understand this; they sued 16 regents individually, which forced the Supreme Court of California to analyze Section 11 and the June 18, 1868 certificate to hold that the original members of the Board of Regents had properly formed a corporation as a legal entity distinct from themselves. Therefore, the current members of that board could not be held liable in their individual capacities for the torts of the corporation.

The current Board of Regents is a "policy board," as a result of reforms unanimously adopted from 1957 to 1960 at the instigation of UC President Clark Kerr. Before Kerr's reforms, the regents operated as an "administrative board" (in Kerr's words) for almost a century. The board met 12 times per year and its finance committee (with full authority to act on behalf of the board) met an additional 11 times, and the university budget was excruciatingly detailed. The result was that the board collectively supervised every aspect of university affairs—no matter how trivial or minor. One sign of the regents' unusually extreme level of micromanagement during this period was that it was seen as a major milestone when acting UC President Martin Kellogg gained the power in 1891 to independently hire janitors (as long as he reported on what he had done at the next meeting of the regents). Another example is that until 1901, replacements for lost diplomas required the approval of the regents. At Kerr's encouragement, the Board of Regents cut down on the number of meetings, delegated powers and responsibilities to the university president and the campus chancellors, delegated more power to the Academic Senate, simplified the UC budget, and greatly reduced the amount of detail that flowed upwards to the regents.

== Composition ==
The majority of the board, the eighteen regents, are appointed via nomination by the governor of California and confirmation by the California State Senate to twelve year terms. One student regent is selected by the board to represent the students for a one year term through a hiring process that is conducted by the board. The remaining seven regents are ex-officio members, namely the president of the University of California; the governor and lieutenant governor of California; the Speaker of the State Assembly; the State Superintendent of Public Instruction, and the President and Vice President of the AAUC (the coordinating body for the alumni associations of UC member institutions).

The Board also has two non-voting faculty representatives and two non-voting staff advisors. The incoming student regent serves as a non-voting regent designate from the date of selection. Selection normally occurs between July and October, and they remain in the position until beginning their formal term the following July 1.

The vast majority of the regents appointed by the governor historically have been lawyers, politicians and businessmen. Over the past two decades, it has been common that UC Regents appointees have donated relatively large sums of money either directly to the governor's election campaigns or indirectly to party election groups.

== Operations ==
Administrative support is provided to the Regents by the Office of the Secretary and Chief of Staff of the Regents of the University of California, which shares an office building with the UC Office of the President in Oakland.

Since President Kerr's reforms, the Board has traditionally held its meetings six times per year and alternated its meeting sites between the northern campuses (usually UCSF Mission Bay, and before then, Berkeley) and the southern campuses (usually UCLA). Thus, for decades, the Board's meetings have utilized temporary seating arrangements rather than a boardroom permanently configured for its exclusive use (which is true of the Board of Trustees of the California State University).

== Pattern of corruption ==
The Board of Regents has been the subject of various corruption scandals throughout the university's long history.

=== Establishment of the University of California ===
The board's first scandal surfaced in 1874. By June 1872, regent Samuel Merritt had become the chair of the board's building committee and initiated planning for the original College of Letters building (later known as North Hall). Although the board also passed a resolution that same month prohibiting self-dealing with respect to construction of campus buildings, the winning bid was ultimately submitted by Merritt's preferred contractor, Power and Ough, "and much of the lumber and cement for the building came from Merritt's own lumber company." The San Francisco Evening Post broke the story on January 6, 1874, and two days later, the California State Assembly's public building committee launched an investigation which held hearings through March 3 of that year. The committee concluded that Merritt had profited financially from providing an inferior building to the university at an exorbitant cost: $24,000 over its reasonable value. Merritt resigned from the board in June 1874 and in October refunded $867 of his lumber company's profits to the university.

=== 1960s-1980s ===
In 1965, free-speech movement activist Marvin Garson responded to a call by the California Federation of Teachers to "investigate the composition and operation of the Board of Regents." He produced a 19-page report documenting prior cases of corruption, concluding that, "taken as a group, the Regents are representatives of only one thing—corporate wealth."

In 1970, the California state auditor found that regent Edwin W. Pauley, who owned Pauley Petroleum, personally profited when university officials steered $10.7 million dollars into one of his company's business deals.

In 1970, the California state auditor investigated regent William French Smith and regent Edward Carter for conflict of interest dealings. The actions investigated included the joint purchase of a $253,750 piece of property for Carter's personal use, with the university paying $178,750 and Carter paying the remaining $75,000. Smith, who was Governor Reagan's personal lawyer and a Reagan appointee to the board, was a lawyer at the law firm representing the Irvine Company, a private real estate company. Carter was a lifetime board member of the Irvine Foundation, which has a controlling interest in the Irvine Company.

=== Modern financial corruption ===
In 2007, the Board of Regents signed the EBI contract, a $50 million university privatization contract funded by the BP oil company. The contract gave financial control over all clean energy research at UC Berkeley to BP, with $15 million directed towards proprietary research allowing the oil company able to keep around a third of the patents produced by the academic employees while also financially controlling all other clean energy research upon the campus. The contract likewise allowed BP oil to construct a building on the UC Berkeley campus with entire floors that only BP employees are allowed to enter. Before the signing of the contract, a number of environmental organizations, including Greenpeace penned a letter to the regents, which was read during the regents meeting on November 2, 2007, which stated,

"The prospect of giant carbon polluters directing research related to and gaining control of key energy technologies is very troubling – especially when the research is conducted at, and the technologies are developed in collaboration with, public institutions."

Following the signing of the contract by the UC Regents, professors complained that BP Oil bypassed normal university hiring and tenure protocol and hired professors directly, without consulting any academic department. Opponents have also argued this and other privatization contracts are a way to replace middle-class engineering jobs with cheap graduate student labor.

Regent Richard C. Blum, financier and husband to Senator Dianne Feinstein, served on the Board of Regents' Investment Committee. Allegations of conflicts of interest have arisen because, during Blum's tenure, UC has invested hundreds of millions of dollars where he had concurrent business interests. An independent review by the California State Auditor found Blum had inappropriately admitted 64 students into University of California campuses who had wealthy families, were donors, or family and friends of Blum and Feinstein. Twenty-two students at UC Berkeley were designated as student athletes who never played on the team, and instead were found to be from families connected to Blum.

According to an investigation by the Sacramento News & Review, conflict-of-interest dealings by the UC Board of Regents accelerated in the years prior to the 2008 recession. Beginning in 2003,

"[M]embers of the board of regents benefited from the placement of hundreds of millions of university dollars into investments, private deals and publicly held enterprises with significant ties to their own personal business activities, while simultaneously increasing the cost of university attendance."

Additionally, the investigation found that some members of the regents’ investment committee, individuals who are also "Wall Street heavy hitters," modified long-standing UC investment policies, specifically, steering away from investing in more traditional instruments (such as blue-chip stocks and bonds) toward largely unregulated and risky alternative investments, such as private equity and private real-estate deals. These changes in UC investment policy brought personal gain to individual members of the board of regents Investment committee, while also reducing the funds within the UC endowment that might have otherwise been used to cover costs related to the operations of the university.

In May 2017, The San Francisco Chronicle reported that the Regents had been hosting costly dinner parties using university funds. Only after extensive public outcry, university leadership released a statement saying the university would no longer fund these dinners.

=== Response to corruption ===
A 2017 audit found additional evidence of corruption in addition to the inappropriate actions by Regent Blum. The audit found that the Board of Regents failed to disclose hundreds of millions of dollars of funding towards thing such as consultants, and mislead the Legislature in its budget reports. This audit recommended increased oversight over the University of California, and prompted a response from the Board itself.

In April 2026, SB144 was introduced by California State Assemblymember Aisha Wahab which would prohibit contracting between the University of California and any private business in which an individual or family member is paid by the business and holds an appointment to the UC in an executive or board position.

== Regents ==
=== Appointed ===
The eighteen appointed regents are appointed by the governor of California to serve 12-year terms. They can be reappointed to serve additional terms.

Appointed Regents
Name	Occupation	Appointed	Term expires	Notes
Hadi Makarechian	Businessman	2008	2032	
Maria Anguiano	Finance	2017	2028	Vice chair
Lark Park	Policy research	2017	2029	
Michael Cohen	Finance	2018	2030	
Jay Sures	Businessman	2019	2032	
Janet Reilly	Businesswoman	2019	2028	Chair
José M. Hernández	Astronaut	2021	2033	
Carmen Chu	Policy	2022	2030	
Elaine Batchlor	Healthcare	2022	2033	
Mark Robinson	Finance	2022	2034	
Ana Matosantos	Policy	2022	2034	
Greg Sarris	Writer	2023	2035	
Nancy Lee	Businesswoman	2023	2036	
Bob Myers	Sports executive	2024	2036	
Rusty Areias	Business	2026	2037	
Mabelle Hueston	Academic	2026	2028	
Chip Robertson	Business	2026	2029	
Scott Galloway	Academic	2026	2038	

=== Student ===
The student regent is appointed by the board of regents to serve for a 2-year term, 1-year voting.

- Miguel Craven (July 1, 2026 - June 30, 2027)

=== Ex officio ===
The Ex officio regents serve on the board of regents by virtue of holding positions elsewhere.

Ex officio regents:

- Gavin Newsom (Governor of California)
- Eleni Kounalakis (Lieutenant Governor of California)
- Robert A. Rivas (Speaker of the California State Assembly)
- Tony Thurmond (California Superintendent of Public Instruction)
- James Milliken (UC President)
- Charles Melton (President, Alumni Associations of UC, 2026–2027)
- Karl Tokita (Vice President, Alumni Associations of UC, 2026–2027)

=== Non-voting participants ===
The following positions do not carry voting abilities or regent status.

==== Regents-designate ====
Regents-designate are non-voting participants who are scheduled to transition to full board membership at later date.

- Paco Retana (given alumni Regent-designate status 2026; designate status expires June 30, 2027)
- Jessica Lum (given alumni Regent-designate status 2026; designate status expires June 30, 2027)
- Jordan Roiland (given student Regent-designate status 2026; designate status expires June 30, 2027)

==== Faculty representatives ====
Faculty Representatives to the Regents are non-voting participants who may be assigned as representatives to certain committees.

- Ahmet Palazoglu (UC Davis) (became a representative in 2024; representative status expires August 31, 2026)
- Susannah Scott (UC Santa Barbara) (became a representative in 2025; representative status expires August 31, 2027)

==== Staff advisors ====
Non-voting participants who are assigned as representatives to Regents' committees.

- Mayté Frías, UC Davis, July 1, 2025 – June 30, 2026)
- Matthew Hanson, UC Irvine (Staff advisor-designate, July 1, 2025 – June 30, 2026; Staff Advisor, July 1, 2026 – June 30, 2027)

== Past regents ==
=== Past appointed regents ===
- Richard C. Blum (2002–2022) [appointed by Gov. Davis; died in office]
- Cecilia Estolano (2018–2022) [appointed by Gov. Newsom; resigned]
- Laphonza Butler (2018–2021) [appointed by Gov. Brown; resigned]
- Ellen Tauscher (2017–2019) [appointed by Gov. Brown; died in office]
- George Kieffer (2009–2021) [appointed by Gov. Schwarzenegger]
- Charlene Zettel (2009–2021) [appointed by Gov. Schwarzenegger]
- Bonnie Reiss (2008–2020) [appointed by Gov. Schwarzenegger]
- William De La Peña (2006–2018) [appointed by Gov. Schwarzenegger]
- Bruce D. Varner (2006–2018) [appointed by Gov. Schwarzenegger]
- Ben Allen (2007–2008)
- Gerry Parsky (1996–2008)
- John J. Moores (1999–2007)
- David S. Lee (1994–2006)
- Ward Connerly (1993–2005)
- Dolores Huerta (2003–2004)
- Howard H. Leach (1990–2001)
- Stephen Nakashima (1989–2001)
- Clair Burgener (1988–1997)
- John F. Henning (1989–1997)
- Tirso del Junco (1985–1997)
- Willis Harman (1980–1990)
- William French Smith (1968–1990)
- Sheldon Andelson (1982–1987)
- Janice Eberly (1985–1986)
- Gregory Bateson (1976–1980)
- William Coblentz (1964–1980)
- Yvonne Burke (1979) (1982–1992)
- Fred Dutton (1962–1978)
- William M. Roth (1961–1977)
- Elinor Raas Heller (1961–1976)
- Norton Simon (1960–1976)
- Edwin W. Pauley (1940–1972)
- Dorothy Buffum Chandler (1954–1968)
- H. R. Haldeman (President, AAUC, 1965–1967; 1968)
- William E. Forbes (1960–1961, 1962)
- Thomas M. Storke (1955–1960)
- Chester W. Nimitz (1948–1956)
- John Francis Neylan (1928–1955)
- Stanley Mosk (1940–1941)
- Paul Peek (1939–1940)
- Edward Augustus Dickson (1913–1956)
- William H. Crocker (1908–1937)
- William John Cooper (1927–1929)
- Phoebe Hearst (1897–1919)
- Stanley Sheinbaum (1977–1989)
- Charles Stetson Wheeler (1892–1896, 1902–1907, 1911–1923)
- Leland Stanford (1882–1883)
- Timothy Guy Phelps (1880–1899)
- Benjamin B. Redding (1880–1882)
- Samuel Merritt (1868–1874) [founding Regents appointed by Gov. Haight]

=== Past honorary regents ===
In its early years, UC had thirteen Honorary Regents, with eight elected in 1868. "Honorary Regents" were full board members, with the word "Honorary" simply denoting their manner of selection (that is, they were elected to serve on the board by the other board members, instead of being appointed by the governor). Some were then appointed to another term, following their term as Honorary Regent, by the governor. One (Tompkins) was re-elected.

- Frederick Low (1868), 9th Governor of California from 1863 to 1867; considered the "father of the University of California"
- Andrew J. Moulder (1868), State Superintendent of Public Instruction, 1862–1863; a founder of Minns’ Evening Normal School in San Francisco in 1857 and of the first California State Normal School in San Jose, approved by the legislature in 1862
- Edward Tompkins (1868–1872)
- Samuel F. Butterworth (1868–1873)
- Joseph M. Moss (1868–1874)
- John B. Felton (1868–1877)
- Isaac Friedlander (1868–1869)
- Augustus J. Bowie (1868–1880)
- William Chapman Ralston (1868:after Low resigned–1875), founder of the Bank of California
- John S. Hager (1868:after Moulder resigned–1890), California state senator and district judge; United States senator from California (1873–1875)
- Louis Sachs (1869–1875)
- Henry H. Haight (1872), 10th governor of California; signed the Charter of the University of California on March 23, 1868
- Andrew Smith Hallidie (1873), "regarded as the inventor of the cable car and father of the present day San Francisco cable car system"; President of the San Francisco Mechanics' Institute 1868–1877 and 1893–1895

== Notable legal cases ==
- Department of Homeland Security v. Regents of the University of California
- Hamilton v. Regents of the University of California
- Moore v. Regents of the University of California
- Regents of the University of California v. Bakke
- Tarasoff v. Regents of the University of California
- USL v. BSDi
- Maibach v. Regents of the University of California
