= California Memorial Stadium =

Stadium in Berkeley, California, USA

- California Memorial Stadium; Strawberry Canyon

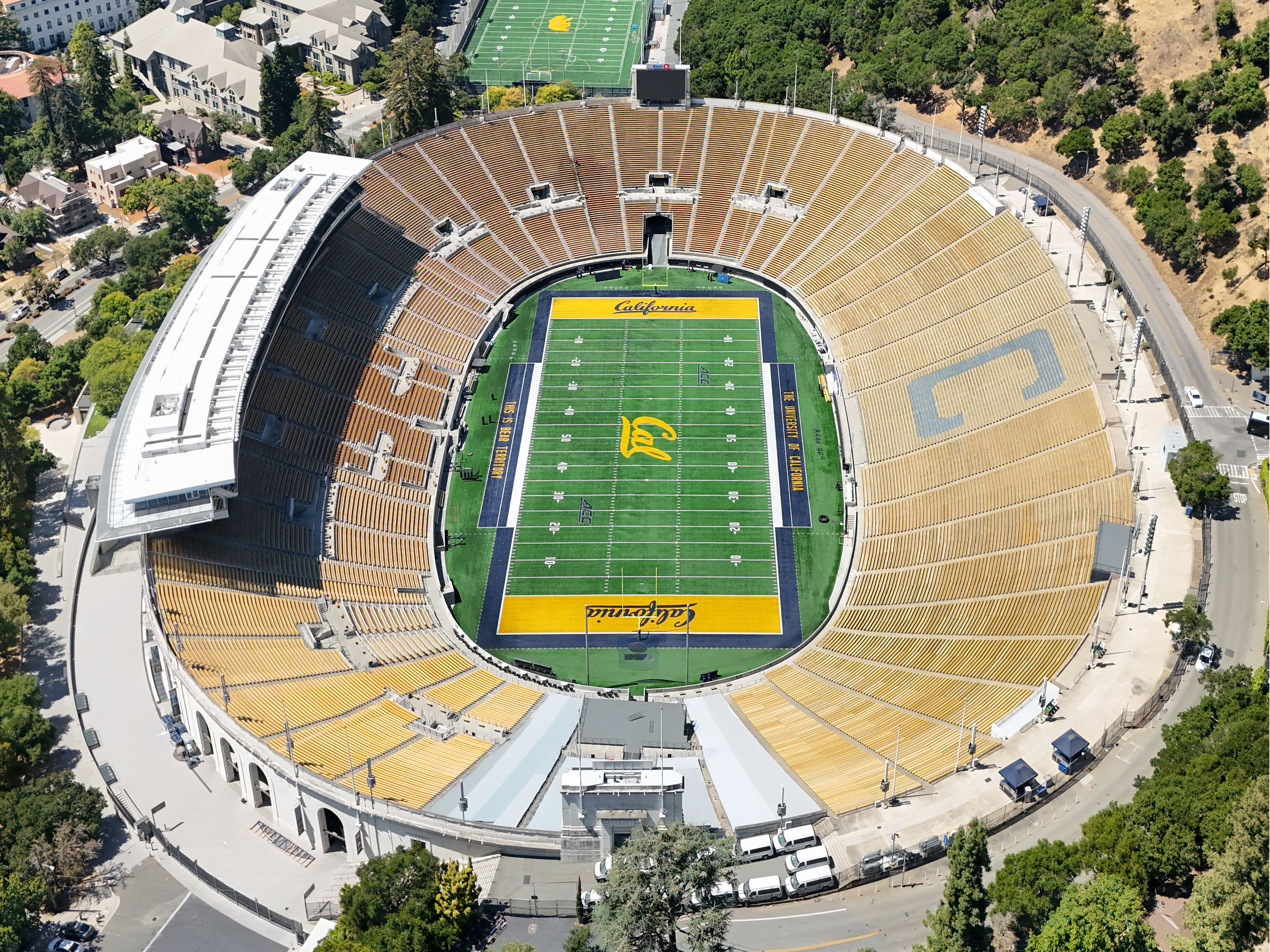
- Aerial view in 2024

- Location in the United States Location in California
- Interactive map of California Memorial Stadium
- Address: 210 Stadium Rim Way
- Location: University of California, Berkeley, California, United States 94720
- Coordinates: 37°52′16″N 122°15′3″W
- Owner: University of California
- Operator: University of California
- Capacity: 52,428 (expandable to 62,467 without tarps) (2024–present)
- Surface: FieldTurf (2017–present); Matrix Turf (2012–2017); Momentum Turf (2003–2010); Grass (1995–2002); AstroTurf (1981–1994); Grass (1923–1980)
- Public transit: Bear Transit from Downtown Berkeley: AC Transit: F, 36, 51B, 52, 79

Construction
- Groundbreaking: December 1922 (site clearing); July 1, 1923
- Opened: November 24, 1923; 102 years ago September 1, 2012; 14 years ago (renovation)
- Cost: $1,437,982 (1923) $321 million (2011)
- Architects: John Galen Howard; Baker & Carpenter; George E. Cunningham
- General contractor: Clinton Construction Company

Tenants
- California Golden Bears (NCAA) (1923–present)

Website
- calbears.com/california-memorial-stadium
- California Memorial Stadium
- U.S. National Register of Historic Places
- Berkeley Landmark
- Location: Bet. Piedmont Ave., Stadium Rim Way, Canyon Rd., Bancroft Way and Prospect St., Berkeley, California
- Built: 1922
- Architectural style: Neoclassicism, Modernism
- NRHP reference No.: 06001086
- BERKL No.: 287

Significant dates
- Added to NRHP: November 27, 2006
- Designated BERKL: June 1, 2006

California Memorial Stadium (also known simply and commonly as Memorial Stadium or CMS) is an outdoor college football stadium located on the campus of the University of California, Berkeley. It is the home field for the California Golden Bears of the Atlantic Coast Conference.

Opened in 1923, the venue currently seats around 63,000 for football; its playing field runs northwest to southeast at an approximate elevation of 410 feet (125 m) above sea level. It has been named one of the top college football stadiums by various publications, and it was listed on the U.S. National Register of Historic Places on November 27, 2006.

In September 2026, Cal Athletics announced a multi-year $22.8 million naming rights deal with Databricks, under which the stadium will officially be known as the Databricks Field at California Memorial Stadium.

Memorial Stadium was funded from public contributions, as a memorial to Californians who lost their lives in World War I (1917–18). The chair of the architectural committee was John Galen Howard, the university's chief architect, and his influence is evident in the stadium's neoclassical motif. In addition to its unique architecture, the stadium's position at the foot of the Berkeley Hills provides top row spectators with panoramic views of San Francisco Bay and west side viewers with views of the Berkeley Hills and Strawberry Canyon. This has earned it a reputation as one of the most scenic venues in college football.

Traditionally, during all football games and especially during the Big Game against Stanford, the hill overlooking the eastern side of Memorial Stadium attracts spectators hoping to watch a game for free, earning the nickname "Tightwad Hill".

== Before Memorial Stadium ==
=== West Field ===
On February 14, 1885, the first football game was played on the University of California campus between the hometown Bears and a football club from San Francisco known as the Merions. The field was located where the Valley Life Sciences Building currently stands (37.8712°N 122.262°W), and the game drew some 450 spectators. In subsequent years, the field was officially named West Field and seating capacity was expanded to around 5,000. However, by 1904, California's football team had become so popular that West Field became too small, therefore, the university decided to build a new stadium with an excess of 20,000 seats.

=== California Field ===
California Field opened its doors in 1904 to replace the antiquated West Field and the boosted capacity allowed California to host important games for the first time. While playing at West Field, the Bears played important games (namely the Big Game) at neutral site venues in San Francisco and with a new over 20,000-seat stadium, California was able to host the first Big Game played outside of San Francisco. The new stadium was located much closer to the center of campus (where Hearst Gymnasium now stands) and was able to draw unprecedented crowds for the time. California Field is also notable because it is where many of California's longstanding traditions began to take form. In 1910, the first card stunt was performed at the Big Game and after victories, the students would "serpentine" around the field—something that is mentioned in the song "Big C". California Field is also where the Golden Bears gained national prominence under head coach Andrew Latham Smith. Four of the Bears' five consecutive undefeated seasons were played at California Field; the stadium was home to three of California's four straight claimed national championships. Because of this success, it became evident that California needed an even larger venue to host its football team; therefore, the team and its fans began pushing for a new stadium.

=== The drive to build Memorial Stadium ===
The early 1920s saw four major collegiate venues open in the State of California: Stanford Stadium, the Rose Bowl, the Los Angeles Memorial Coliseum, and California Memorial Stadium. With the success of the California football program and the openings of the new football venues for Stanford and USC, the campus community was nearly unanimous in its desire to see the Bears get a new stadium of their own. One of the first proposals for a new stadium was on the south-western corner of the campus where Edwards Stadium and Evans Diamond currently stand. This proposal was eventually rejected and the regents settled on a site at the mouth of Strawberry Canyon. The location caused considerable controversy, with objections rising from local community arguing that it would "ruin the beauty of the canyon, destroy the canyon as a natural biological laboratory for the University, and create traffic and transportation problems." There were also protests from homeowners whose homes would be demolished, as well as those whose views would be blocked by the building. However, the popularity of Andy Smith's "Wonder Teams" prevailed and fundraising began in 1922.

The $1 million stadium was funded completely by 10,000 seat subscriptions at $100 per subscription; the fundraising drive through these subscriptions was a complete success, with all subscriptions selling out in less than ten days. With funding secured, the university broke ground in January 1923, hoping to open the new stadium in time for the 1923 Big Game.

=== Construction ===
Because the stadium would be directly atop the Hayward Fault, it was constructed out of two halves, the eastern side was built into the hills, while the west side contained the main structure built in the neo-classical architecture style to resemble the Roman Coliseum. Expansion joints were placed where the two sides connected, allowing them to separately move during an earthquake. During the construction 2,500 pine trees were planted on what became known as the Tightwad Hill.

== Original California Memorial Stadium: 1923–2010 ==
=== History ===
California played its first seven games of the 1923 season at old California Field preparing to open the new 75,000-seat stadium at Strawberry Canyon for the final game of the season—the Big Game—against Stanford. Both teams were having a good season in 1923 with California going undefeated up to that point (with a tie to Nevada) and Stanford going into the Big Game with a record of 7–1. Leading up to the first game at Memorial Stadium, some in the media suggested to Bears coach Andy Smith that the opening of new stadiums was cursed: Stanford lost the first game played at Stanford Stadium while USC lost the inaugural game of both the Rose Bowl and the Los Angeles Coliseum. Smith simply replied, "Why, of course they did, it was always California they invited to help dedicate their stadiums." The Bears went on to win the inaugural game at California Memorial Stadium by a final score of 9–0, beating Stanford for the fifth straight year and securing their fourth straight undefeated season.

When California Memorial Stadium opened in 1923, the permanent capacity of the venue was around 75,000 and expandable to around 85,000. For important games, the university would bring out temporary bleachers that would stand around the eastern rim of the stadium. It was during this time, that California set their all-time attendance record in 1947 with an announced crowd of 83,000 for a game against Navy.

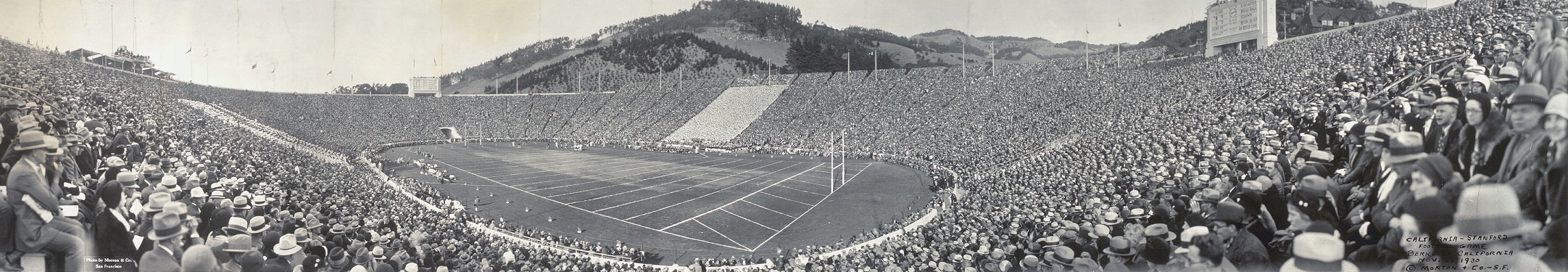
California-Stanford football game, Memorial Stadium, Nov. 22, 1930

As the California football team's fortunes on the field began to fall in the second half of the century and there was a demand for wheelchair seating along the eastern rim, the university did away with the temporary bleachers bringing the stadium's maximum football capacity back down to the permanent capacity of 75,000.

Due to the seismic vulnerability of the old press box, the University of California dismantled the structure and installed a temporary facility that stood until the 2010 season. The installation of the temporary press box brought the stadium's capacity down to 73,347 and then down to 72,516 for the 2004 season. California brought the seating capacity further down to 67,537 with tarps being placed over four sections (one in each corner). The university did remove the tarps, however, for important games allowing a full 72,516 to attend. Because of safety concerns, the university brought the capacity down to 71,799 for the 2008 season.

After the 2010 season, the entire west side of the bowl was demolished and rebuilt. The stands in the original stadium descended right down to the football field, and the view from the lowest midfield seats on the west side could be blocked by the standing visiting team members. To eliminate this problem, the surface of the field was lowered four feet to allow unobstructed seats in the first few rows during the 2010-12 renovation. The capacity of the refurbished stadium is now 63,186, and was sold out for the first game of the 2012 season in a 31-24 Cal loss against the University of Nevada Wolf Pack.

=== Capacity ===
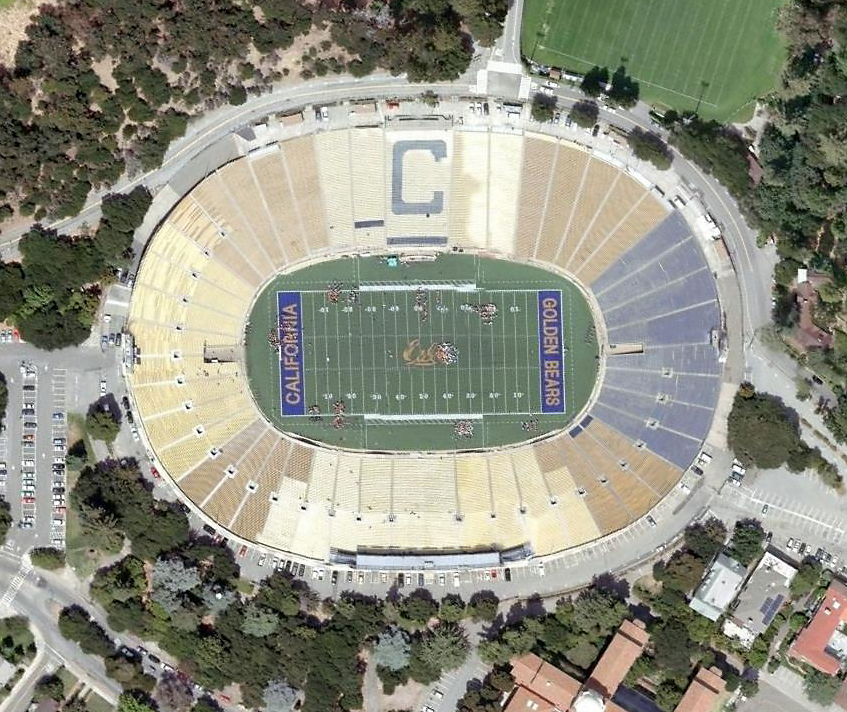
Satellite view, November 2008

Years	Capacity
2024–present	52,428 (expandable to 62,467)
2022-2023	51,892 (expandable to 62,467)
2013–2021	62,467
2012	63,186
2008–2010	71,799
2006–2007	72,516
2003–2005	67,537 (expandable to 72,516)
2002	73,347
1998–2001	75,028
1996–1997	74,909
1982–1995	75,662
1961–1981	76,780
1951–1960	81,490
1949–1950	80,239
1938–1948	80,000
1937	77,963
1927–1936	78,461
1926	78,671
1923–1925	72,609

=== Other major events ===
California Memorial Stadium has seen a number of major events throughout the years other than California football. Before 1970, the general commencement exercises of the University of California were regularly held at Memorial Stadium. The large campus-wide commencement, however, was cancelled in 1970 because of the many protests that were taking place at the time—university officials at the time did not see it wise to have such a large gathering annually with the protests going on. General Commencements have since returned to the University of California campus, with the exercises being performed at Memorial Stadium, Haas Pavilion, Hearst Greek Theatre, and most recently Edwards Stadium. On March 23, 1962, to commemorate Charter Day (the anniversary of the founding of the University of California), President John F. Kennedy gave a speech at Memorial Stadium in front of an above capacity crowd of 88,000.

==== Soccer ====
Real Madrid and Inter Milan played at Memorial Stadium on July 26, 2014, one of their matches in the 2014 International Champions Cup. The match, played before a sold-out crowd of 62,583, ended in a 1–1 tie after regulation and Inter Milan won the shootout 3–2. The usual artificial turf was converted and this match was played on natural grass.

Date	Winning Team	Result	Losing Team	Tournament	Spectators
July 26, 2014	(Italy) Inter Milan	1–1; 3–2 (pens.)	(Spain) Real Madrid	2014 International Champions Cup	62,583

==== Oakland Raiders ====
The NFL's Oakland Raiders played their second game of the 1973 regular season at Memorial Stadium. The game against the defending Super Bowl champion Miami Dolphins was moved from the Raiders' regular home, the Oakland Coliseum, because of a scheduling conflict with the Oakland Athletics, who hosted the Minnesota Twins at the Coliseum the following night. The Raiders ended the Dolphins' NFL record 18-game winning streak with a 12–7 victory on four field goals by 45-year-old George Blanda on September 23. Several preseason games were also played at the stadium in the early 1970s.

Ultimately, in response to traffic and parking issues associated with these games (while Cal games drew a large number of students who live on or near campus and walk to the games, Raider games attracted fans from a larger geographic area who were used to tailgating at the Coliseum and were more likely to drive to games), the City of Berkeley passed a Professional Sports Events License Tax in which the city collected 10% of all gate receipts, making the staging of professional games inside the city cost-prohibitive. The Raiders were granted an injunction from the city collecting the tax, arguing that the tax was a regulatory measure rather than a revenue measure, and was therefore an improper regulation on land held in trust by the Regents of the University of California. However, the grant of the injunction was reversed by the California Court of Appeals, who found it to be a revenue measure, despite the fact that the city had made the measure immediately effective "due to danger to the public peace, health, and safety of the City of Berkeley as a result of the holding of professional sports events there."

=== Playing surface ===
Originally a natural grass field, AstroTurf was installed in Memorial Stadium in 1981 and remained for fourteen seasons. Natural grass returned in 1995, and varsity football practices were held at Witter Rugby Field, saving the stadium's grass field for game days only. In 2003, Momentum Turf, an infilled artificial turf similar to FieldTurf, was installed. This allowed for minimal maintenance and increased utilization of the stadium, for football practices and other sports, on the space-limited campus. The field is also marked for international soccer, but this wider dimension allows little reserve room beyond the official lines.

== Renovation: 2010–2012 ==
=== Need for renovation ===
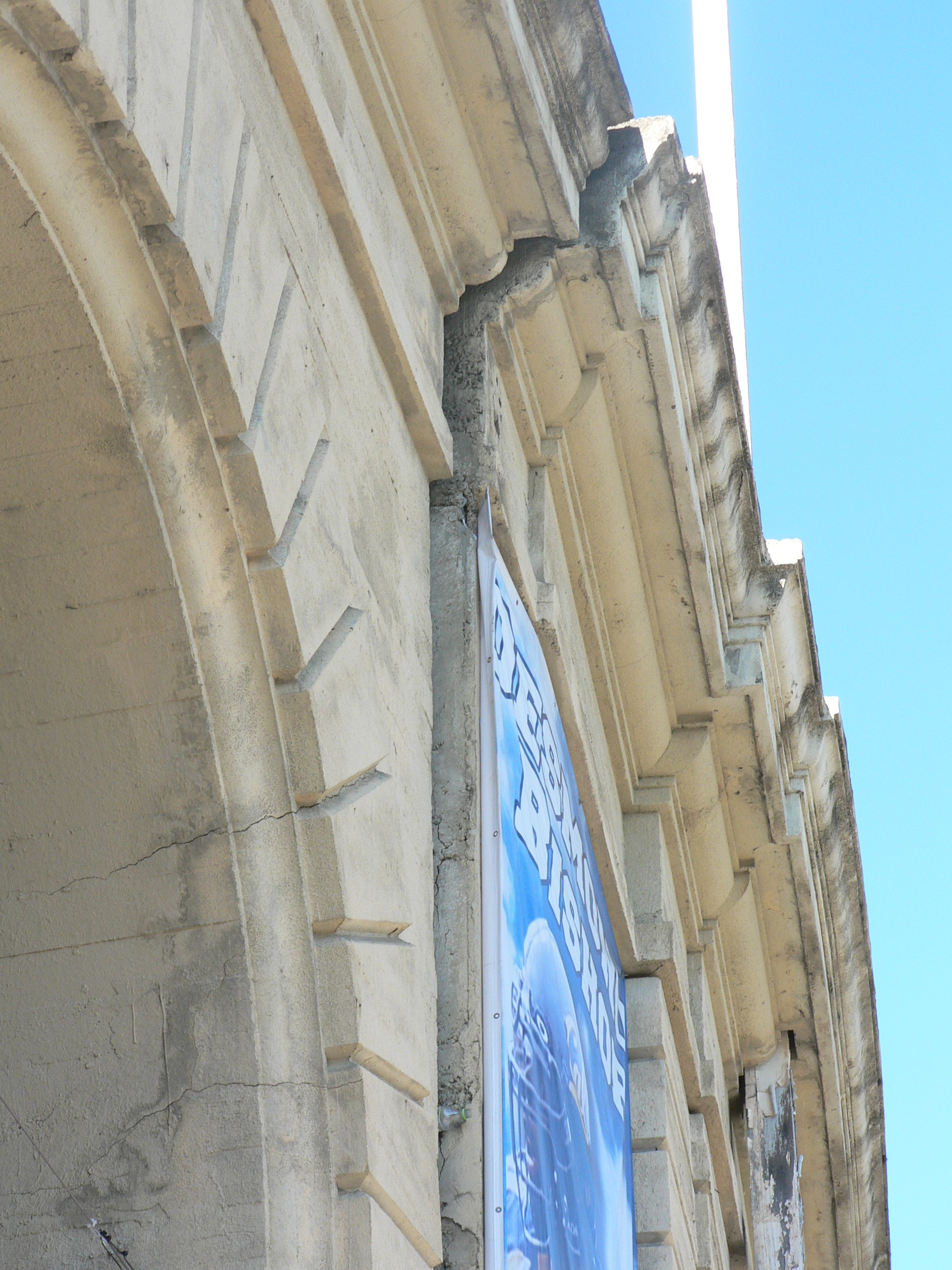
Due to creeping of the Hayward fault, the stadium walls were slowly separating

The Hayward Fault passes directly under the playing field of Memorial Stadium (nearly from goal post to goal post.), where right-lateral strike-slip motion is shifting the east half of the building to the south at a rate of 1.2 mm/yr; during its construction, expansion joints had been placed in the walls of the stadium to maintain the integrity of the building. A 1998 seismic safety study on the California campus gave the stadium a "poor" rating (meaning that the building represents an "appreciable life hazard" in an earthquake), and estimated the cost of making the structure safe at $14 million. Because the stadium is on the U.S. National Register of Historic Places and because of the nostalgia that surrounds the site, the university decided that a retrofit and renovation (as opposed to building a new stadium elsewhere) would be the best scenario for the California football program. In February 2005, Chancellor Robert Birgeneau announced plans to renovate Memorial Stadium, improving the existing facilities and creating a safer environment for the fans as well as the people that work at the stadium. HNTB Architecture and STUDIOS Architecture were the architects for the renovation of the stadium and the new Simpson Center for Student-Athlete High Performance.

=== Phase I ===
Phase I consisted of building the 142,000-square-foot (13,200 m^{2}) Simpson Center for Student-Athlete High Performance next to the west wall of the stadium. The center was built to be the home of football and 12 of California's Olympic sports that were previously housed in Memorial Stadium. The center saw the construction of new locker rooms, offices meeting rooms, training and sports medicine facilities, and an academic center in the SAHPC. The roof of the athletic center also acts as a pedestrian plaza. Phase I of the renovations were originally scheduled to begin the spring and summer of 2006 but was delayed by a court injunction due to three lawsuits against the project. A small group of tree-sitters occupied the oak grove on the west side of the stadium beginning on the "Big Game" day in December 2006 but in September 2008 the court injunction was lifted, the protesters came down, and construction of the athletic center began. The Simpson Center for Student-Athlete High Performance (originally SAHPC) opened in the Fall of 2011 and became 100% operational in January 2012.

=== Phase II ===
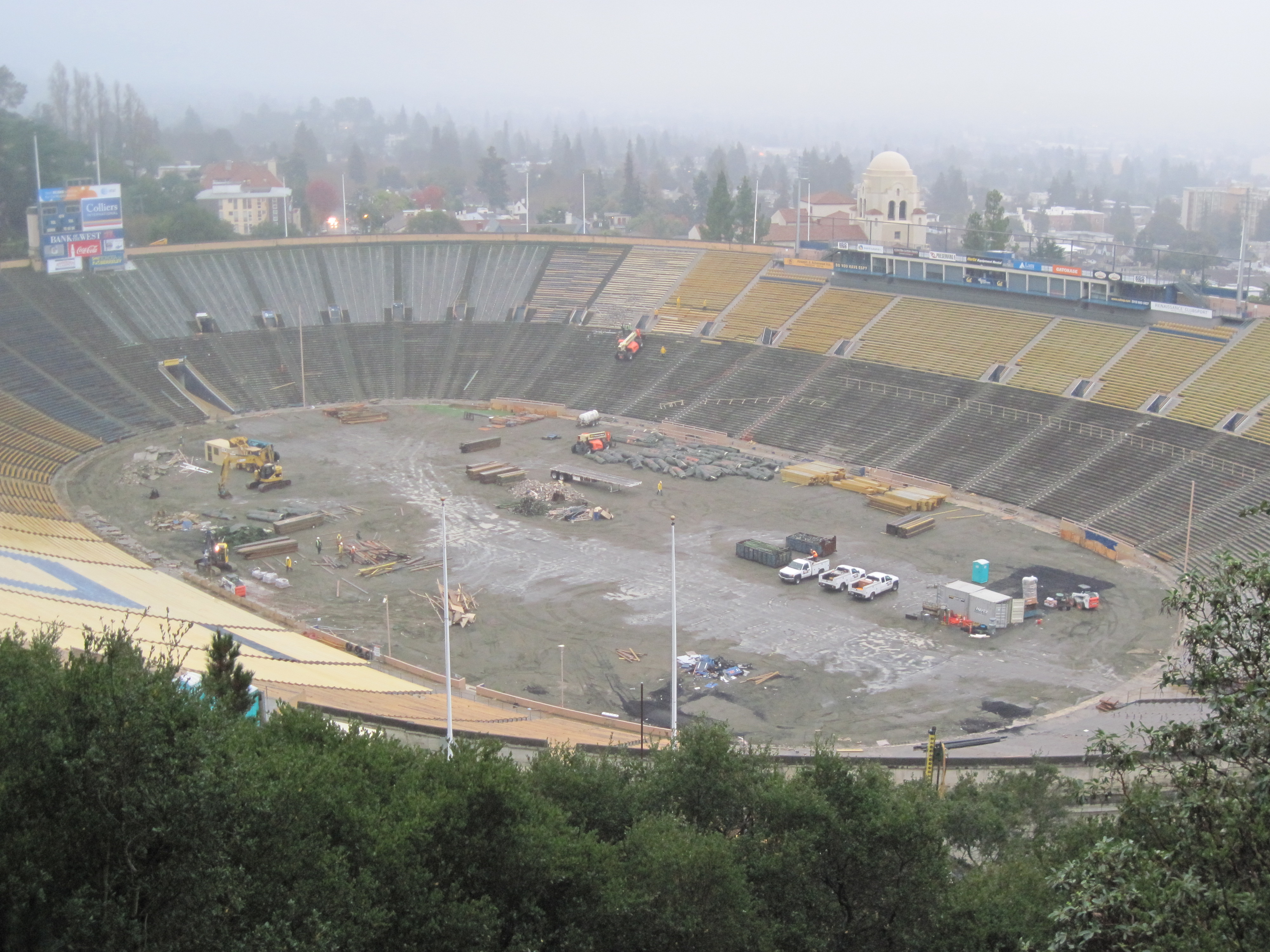
Progress of the refurbishing after the final football game in December 2010, from Tightwad Hill

On Sept. 17, 2009, the UC Board of Regents approved the retrofit and renovation of California Memorial Stadium. The $321 million project commenced in June 2010 and was completed in time for the 2012 season. The Bears played at AT&T Park in San Francisco for the 2011 season while the renovations were being made. The west side of the stadium was demolished and rebuilt except for the outer wall. Club levels, a new press box, bathrooms and concession stands were added. The surface of the field was lowered four feet to improve the view from the lowest midfield seats on the west side, which previously were blocked by standing visiting team members. A surface rupture block was placed in each end zone where the fault line passes through the stadium. These blocks can move independently from the rest of the stadium and were built on top of three feet of sand and plastic sheets. Expansion joints were placed between the surface rupture blocks and the rest of the stadium.

=== Phase III ===
Phase III of the Memorial Stadium renovation and retrofit is the renovation of the stadium's east side by adding modern amenities to that side of the stadium. Originally, this part of the project was to begin in the Fall of 2009, but because of the delay of phase II, the east side's improvements have been delayed indefinitely. The eventual improvements on the east side of the stadium called for an extension of the concourse to wrap around the stadium, new restrooms, ADA seating, and vendors.

== Renovation financing ==
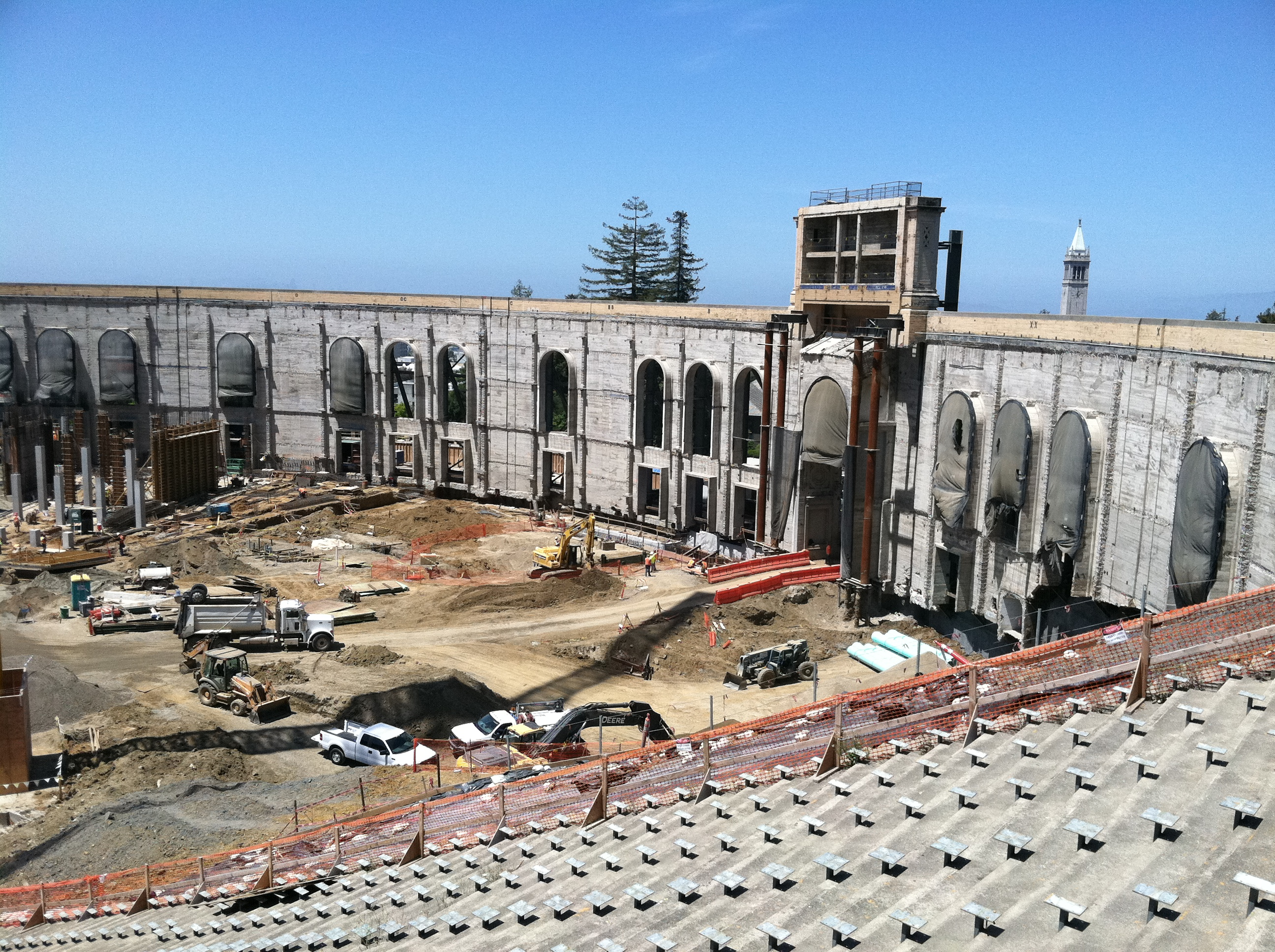
Construction progress in June 2011

For the stadium's $321 million renovation and new $153 million Student-Athlete High Performance Center, the university incurred a controversial $445 million of debt, which it planned to finance with the sale of special stadium seats in the Endowment Seating Program.

The renovation financial plan was approved by the Regents on Sept. 17, 2009. It established “debt service to be structured to defer principal until the 21st year”. Specifically, the plan projected twenty years of interest-only debt payments of $28.02 million annually followed by ten years of annual debt payments of $62.48 million to cover both interest and principal repayment.

Before the start of the stadium reconstruction, Professor Brian A. Barsky showed that the financial plan was untenable. He pointed out that the Regents had approved an unrealistic financial plan with a $1.185 billion financial obligation requiring repayment from the “gross revenues” of the perennially money-losing Cal Intercollegiate Athletics program which would consequently need to allocate its first 79 percent of annual gross revenues to debt service, thereby leaving only 21 percent of its revenues to pay its expenses. He further calculated that although $215 million had been repeatedly claimed to have been raised as of January 15, 2010, the true figure was closer to only about $20 million as of December 2010.

His calculations were subsequently corroborated by The Wall Street Journal, which reported in April 2012 that only $31 million had been received as of the end of December 2011; this was followed by further reporting of poor seat sales in the Endowment Seating Program. As of June 30, 2016, the fund balance was $60.98 million, far short of the $215 million that had been claimed five years earlier.

In early 2013, the debt was restructured with the thirty year plan that the Regents had approved in September 2009 exploding to a one-hundred year plan involving Century bonds. Specifically, the debt is structured as interest-only annual payments for the first twenty years, at roughly $18 million per year, followed by principal repayment which will begin in 2032 with the annual debt payment rising to about $26 million per year, then about $28 million in 2033, the about $30 million per year for 2034–2038, and about $37 million per year for 2039–2044. The debt payments are scheduled to continue for 100 years from its 2013 inception, concluding in 2113.

On November 3, 2017, Chancellor Carol Christ announced that the university would overtake the earthquake retrofitting expenses part of the renovation. This amount is estimated to be approximately 60 percent of the total expenses or $200 million with the remaining expenses still being retained by the athletic department. Exactly where in the budget the funds would be taken was not announced, although the chancellor did state that they would not be taken out of student tuition or tax-payer funds for the university. It was not ruled out that the money could be taken out of funds for academic departments.

== Renovated California Memorial Stadium: 2012–present ==
=== Opening ceremony ===
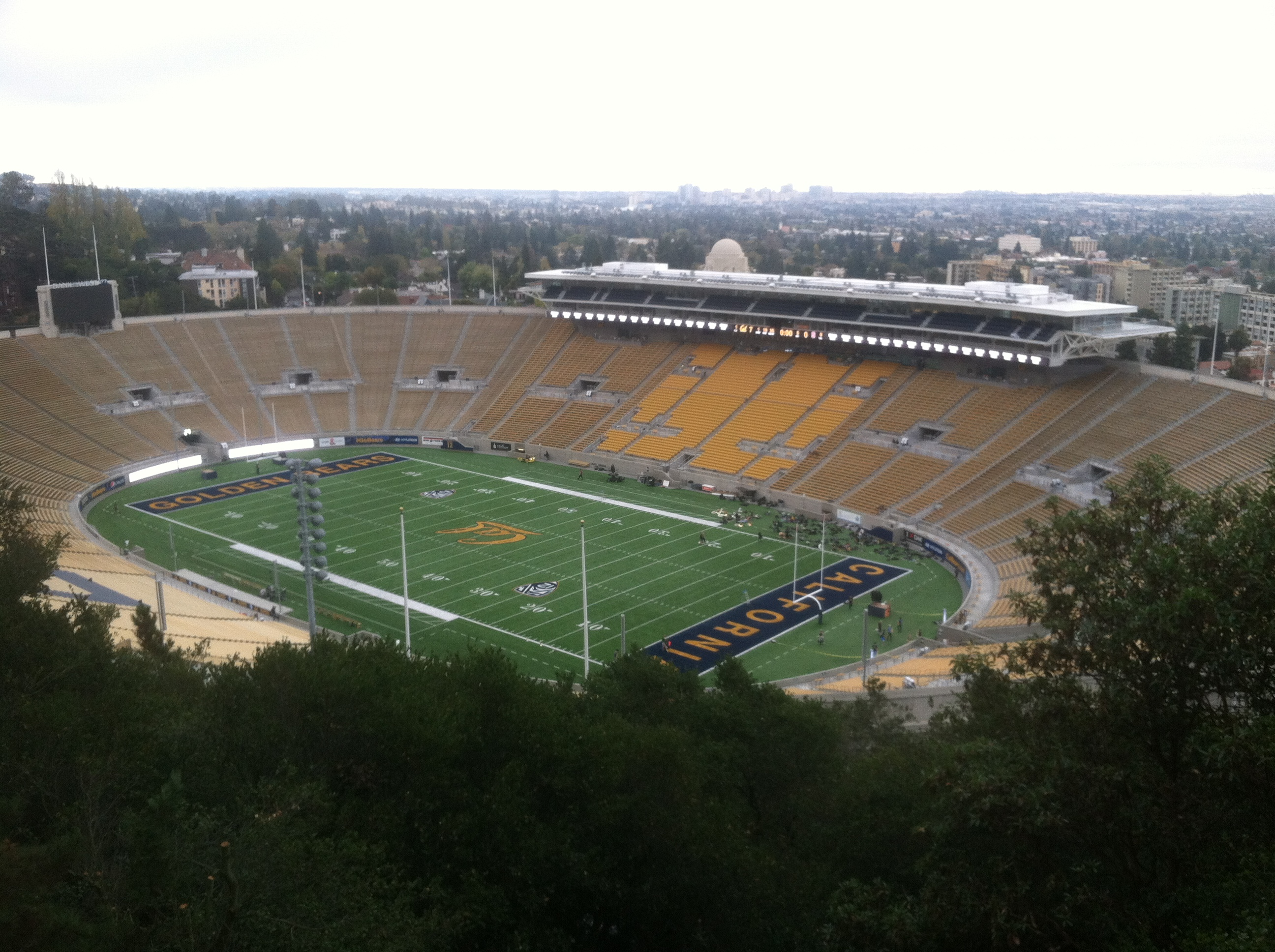
The stadium during the 2012 football season

The University of California reopened the stadium on September 1, 2012, for a home football game against the University of Nevada. This was the first football game in Berkeley since the end of the 2010 season. The sellout crowd of 63,186 watched the Nevada Wolf Pack spoil the grand re-opening with a 31–24 victory, Cal's first loss to Nevada at home since before the original stadium opened in 1923. There were many noticeable differences between the new, more modern stadium and the old stadium that closed in 2010. Except the historic façade, the entire west side of the stadium was demolished, allowing the university to make the venue seismically safe, and add modern amenities. Most noticeable changes included club seating, along with a new pressbox, atop the western stands. The east side, however, has remained relatively unchanged. The stadium was originally dedicated to the memory of those Californians that were lost in World War I, and on October 6, 2012, the university rededicated California Memorial Stadium in the memory of all Californians who sacrificed their lives in service to the nation.

=== Capacity ===
Because of the inclusion of seat back and bench back seating in the same footprint as before, the renovation and retrofit reduced the seating capacity by around 10,000 seats. Original estimates stated that the official stadium capacity would be around 63,000–65,000, down from the 71,799 capacity that Memorial Stadium had in 2010. Capacity at the beginning of the 2012 season ended up at 63,186. Since 2022, the four southernmost sections have been tarped off, and a terrace was built in the middle, connected to the concourse.

2012–present: 63,186
Estimate during construction: 62,717

=== Playing surface ===
The playing field was lowered 4 feet (1.2 m) to improve sight lines, and surfaced with Matrix Turf, an artificial turf with crumb rubber infill along with a silica pea gravel base to allow improved field drainage. In 2017, the playing surface was changed to FieldTurf as part of Cal's transition to its new partnership with Under Armour. In 2023, the turf was replaced with sod, and the endzones became gold, likely to Cal's new partnership with Nike.

=== Kabam naming rights ===
In December 2013, Cal Athletics announced a 15-year $18 million naming rights deal with Kabam, at the time the largest naming rights agreement in the history of college athletics. Under the agreement, the field was called Kabam Field at California Memorial Stadium. In July 2017, Kabam pulled out of the deal.

=== FTX naming rights ===
In August 2021, Cal Athletics announced a 10-year $17.5 million naming rights deal with FTX. Under the agreement the field was known officially as FTX Field at California Memorial Stadium. In November 2022, the deal was suspended and FTX's logo was removed from the field surface amid FTX's bankruptcy.

=== Databricks naming rights ===
In September 2026, Cal Athletics announced a multi-year $22.8 million naming rights deal with Databricks. Under the agreement the field is known officially as Databricks Field at California Memorial Stadium.

== Gallery ==
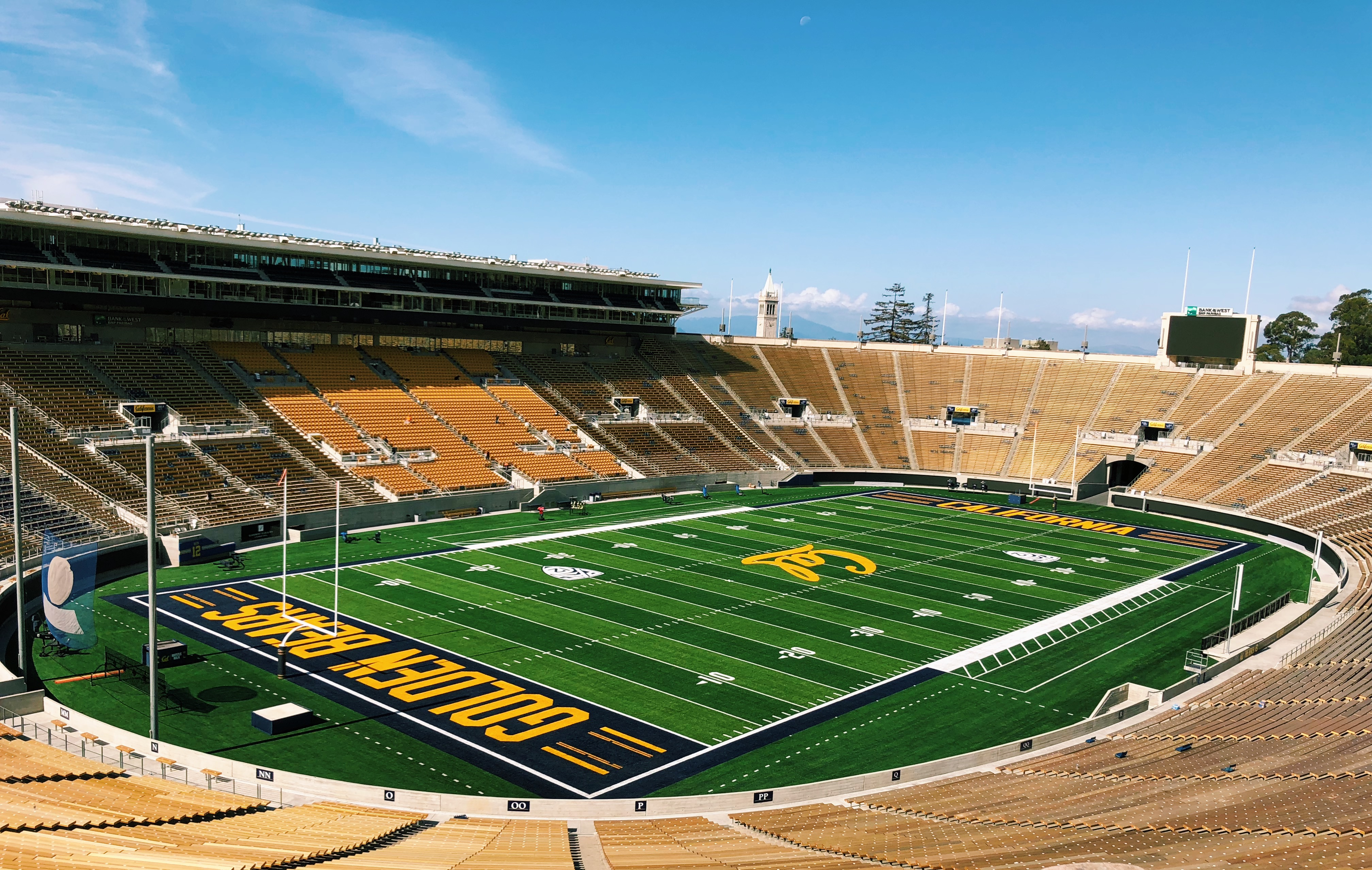
View northwest, with Sather Tower in the distance

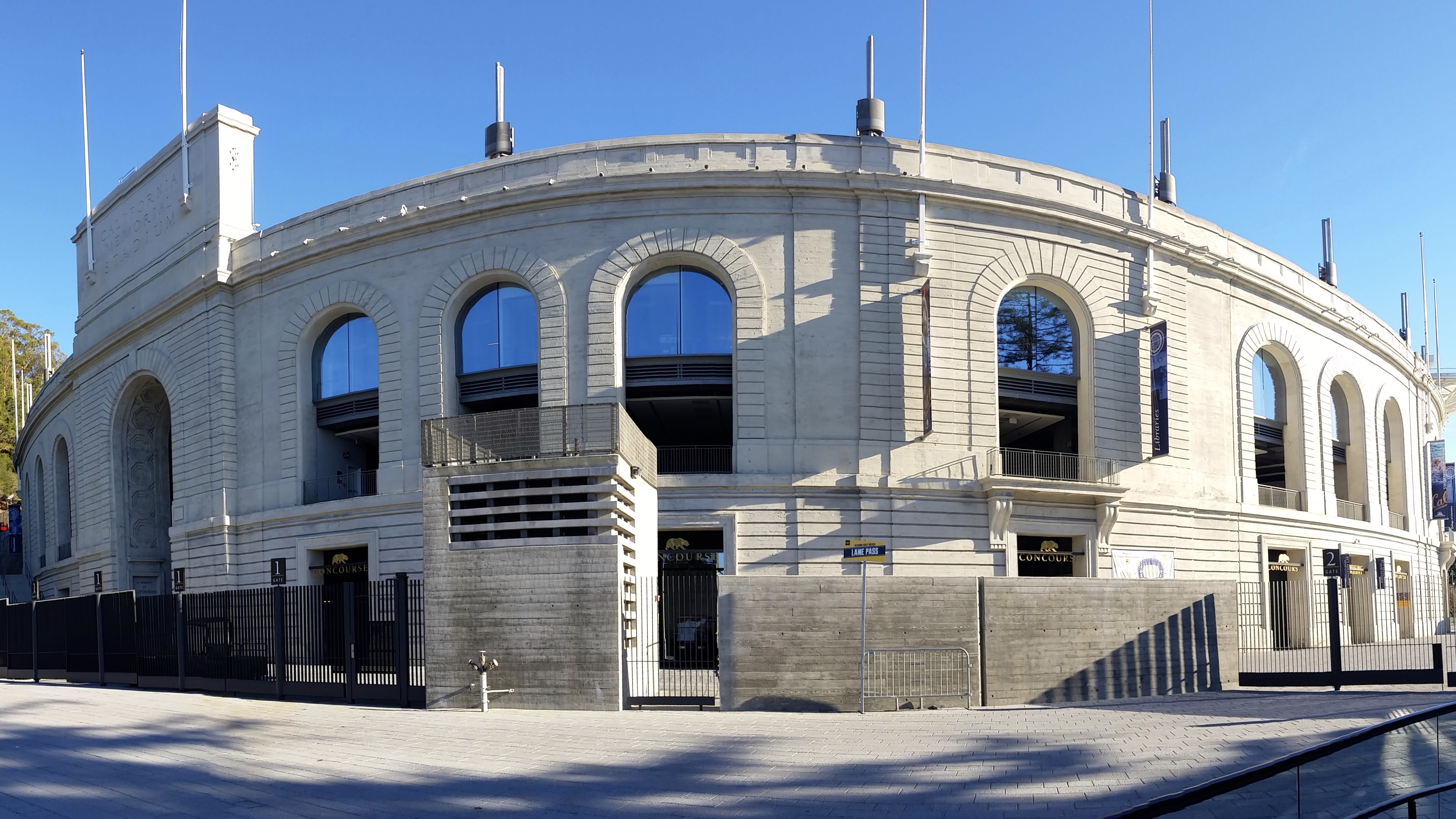
West side of the stadium, view from the north

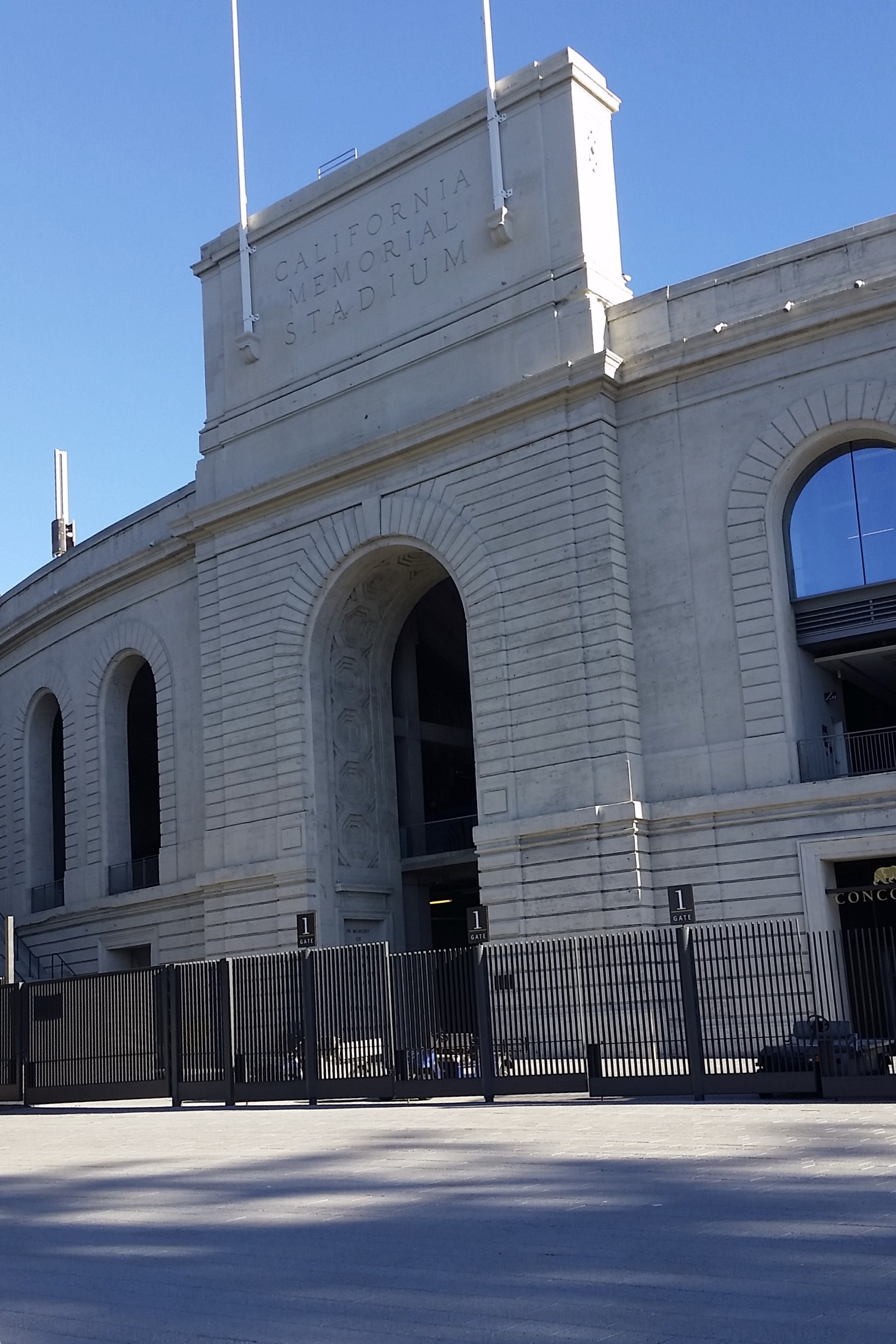
Northern gate

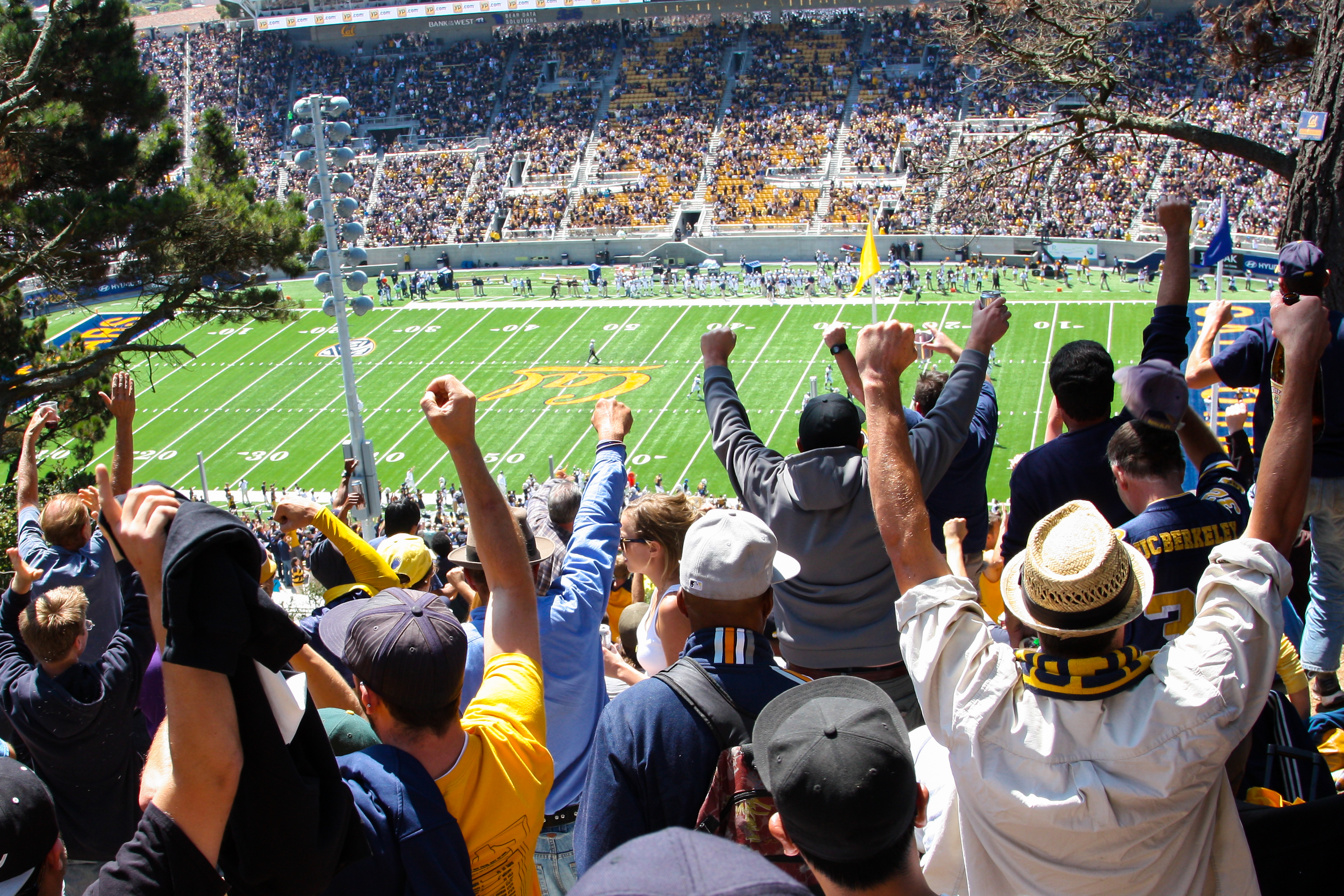
View from Tightwad Hill

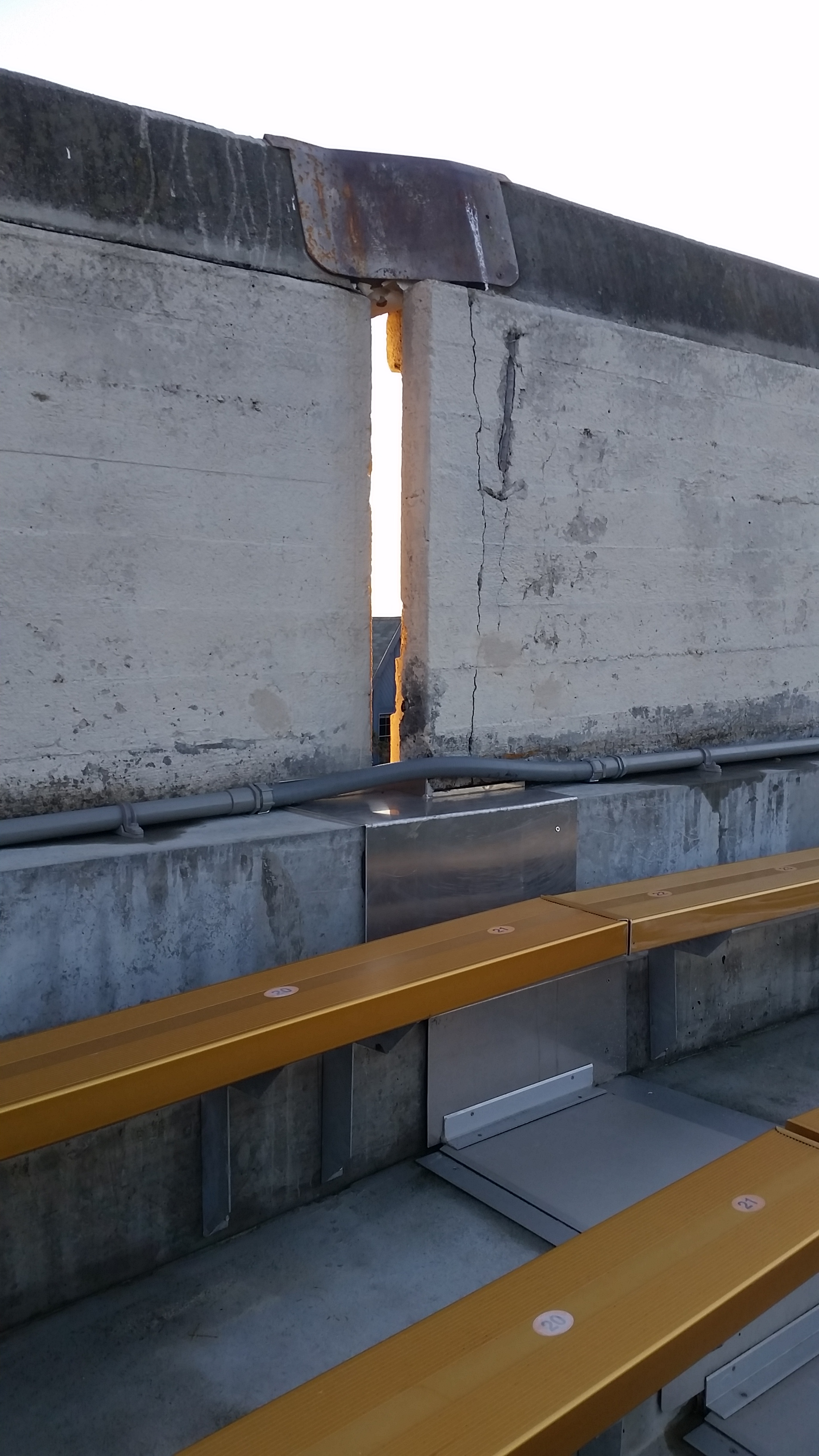
Hayward fault wall separation

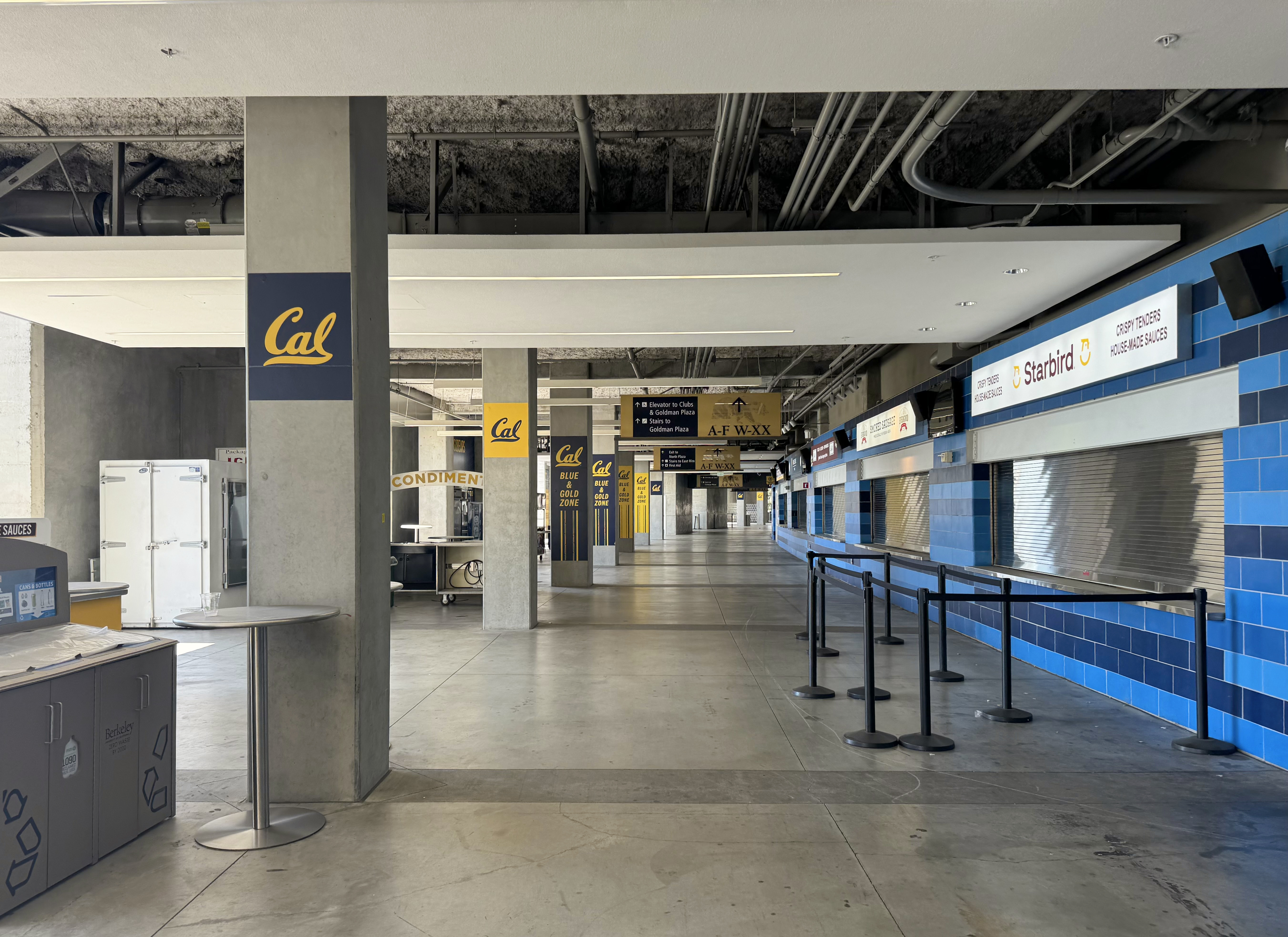
Concourse

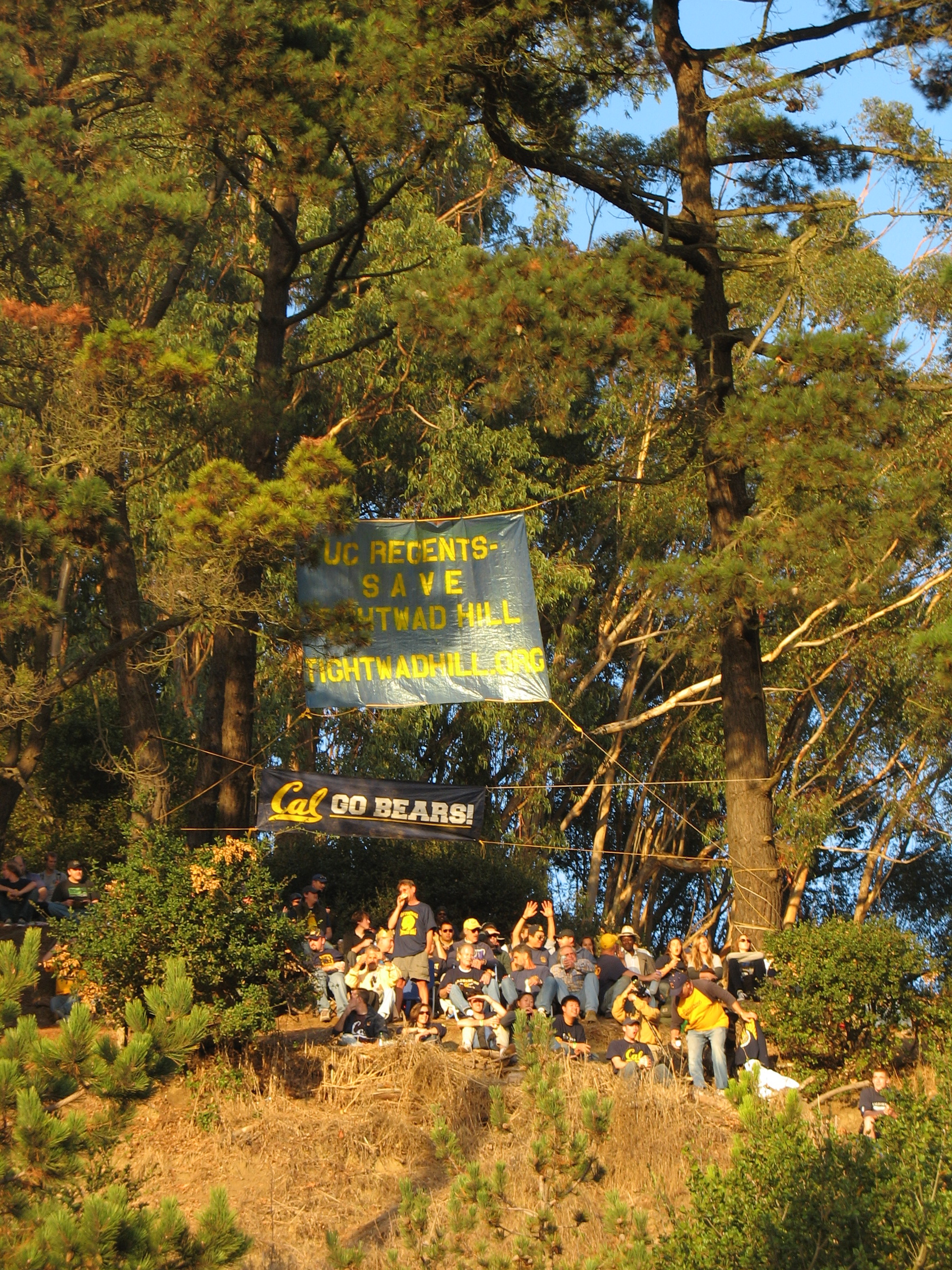
Tightwad Hill

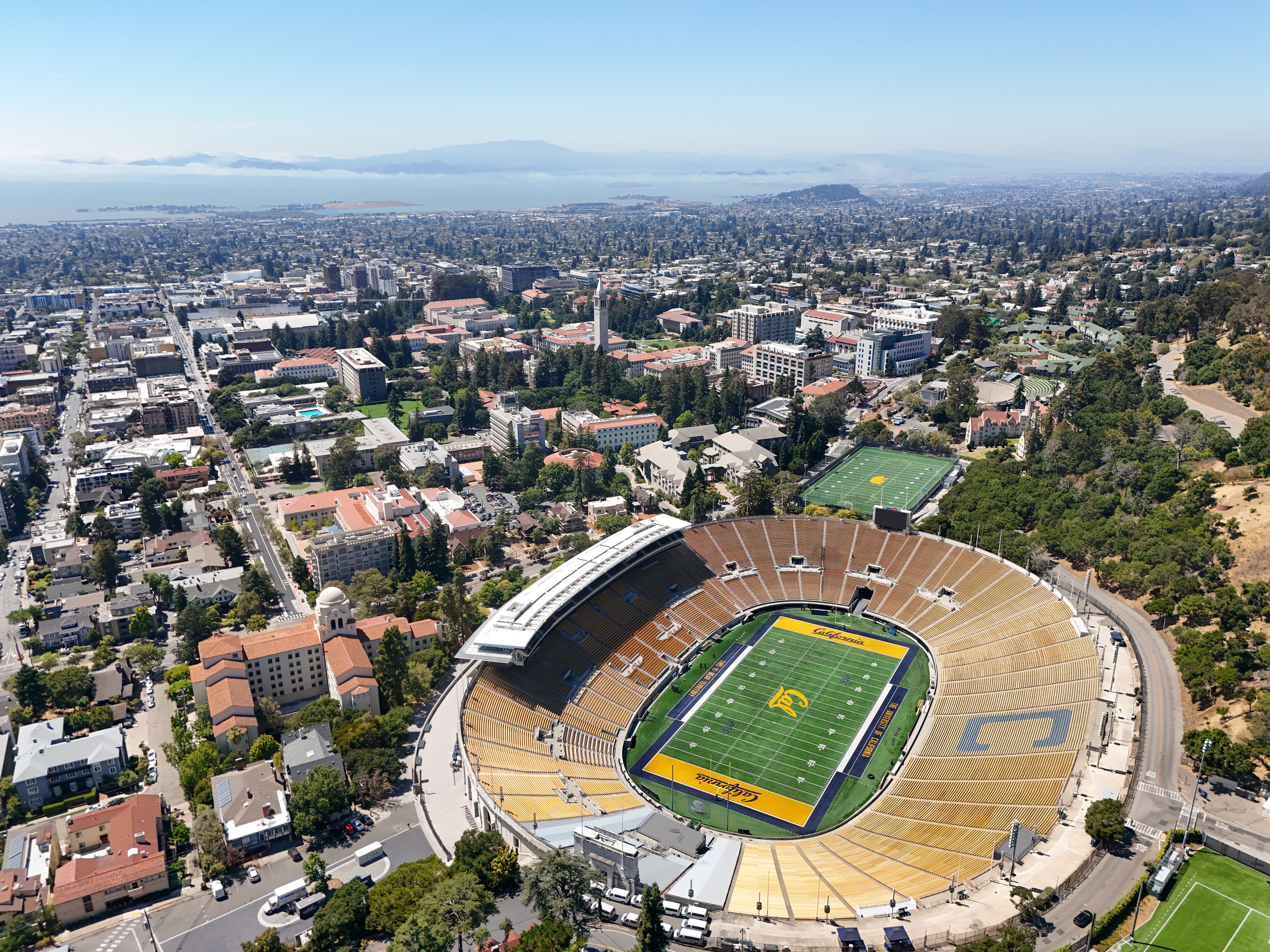
Aerial view from southeast

== See also ==
- California Field
- List of NCAA Division I FBS football stadiums
