= Maibach (Axtbach) =

River in Germany

Location
- Country: Germany
- States: North Rhine-Westphalia

Physical characteristics
- Mouth
  - location: Axtbach
  - coordinates: 51°53′34″N 08°11′14″E

Basin features
- Progression: Axtbach→ Ems→ North Sea

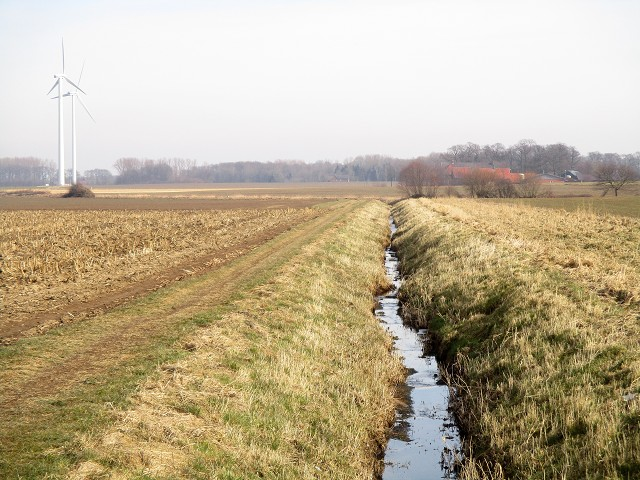
Maibach river

Maibach is a river of North Rhine-Westphalia, Germany. It is 7.5 km long and flows into the Axtbach as a left tributary near Clarholz.

== See also ==
- List of rivers of North Rhine-Westphalia
