= Howard Maibach =

American dermatologist

Howard I. Maibach is an American dermatologist and professor of dermatology at the University of California, San Francisco (UCSF). His major contributions include seminal work in wound management, and he has done extensive work in patient care, dermatophysiology, dermatophamacology, and dermatotoxicology. In 2013, he was awarded the Master Dermatologist Award by the American Academy of Dermatology for outstanding contributions to the practice and teaching of dermatology.

== Biography ==
Maibach was born on 18 July 1929, in New York City. He graduated from Tulane University School of Medicine in 1955, and completed his internship at William Beaumont Army Hospital in El Paso, Texas in 1956. He completed his Fellowship from Hospital of the University of Pennsylvania in 1961. He also practiced neuropsychiatry for few months in 1956.

== Professional work ==
He is a specialist in contact and occupational dermatitis, including the toxicological and pharmacological aspects. He is also known for his work in neonatal skin, dose response of topical drugs and per-cutaneous penetration. The UCSF Dermatology Department website lists 1,500 medical journal articles by Dr. Maibach published from 1960 to 2025.

== Research ethics ==
In December 2022, UCSF released the results of a preliminary investigation into his research conducted on prisoners at the California Medical Facility. The report raised ethical concerns over how the research was conducted, especially with regards to getting informed consent from and communicating research risks to participants, and the fact that many of the prisoners were being assessed or treated for psychiatric conditions. The report noted that the experiments did not involve treating medical conditions the patients had, and in some cases involved exposing patients to herbicides and insecticides. In his response to the report, Maibach expressed remorse regarding his involvement in the research, saying, "[While] the work I did with colleagues at CMF was considered by many to be appropriate by the standards of the day, [in retrospect] those standards were clearly evolving. I obviously would not work under those circumstances today... I have sincere remorse in relationship to these efforts some decades ago." The University of California at San Francisco issued an apology for its role in supporting the research.

In 2023, Maibach filed a lawsuit against the University of California, titled Maibach v. Regents of the University of California. The litigation followed the university's 2022 public apology. After the court's ruling, the UC Regents chose not to appeal. The records were released and Maibach was awarded $804,350 in attorney's fees and court costs.

== Honors ==
Maibach was awarded an honorary PhD by Universite de Paris-Sud in 1985 and by Université Claude Bernard in 2008. In 2013, he was awarded the Master Dermatologist Award by the American Academy of Dermatology.

== Publications ==
- Maibach, Howard; Menne, Torkil (1990). Exogenous Dermatoses: Environmental Dermatitis.
- Maibach, Howard; Surber, C., eds. (1991). Topical Corticosteroids.
- Maibach, Howard; Roenigk, Henry H. (1991). Psoriasis (Dermatology Series).
- Maibach, Howard; Reeves, R.T. (1991). Clinical Dermatology Illustrated: A Regional Approach, Second Edition.
- Adams, Robert M.; Larsen, Walter G.; Maibach, Howard (1991). Color Text of Contact Dermatitis.
- Dahl, Mark V.; Maibach, Howard; Orkin, Milton (1992). Dermatology.
- Levine, Norman; Maibach, Howard (1993). Pigmentation and Pigmentary Disorders (Dermatology: Clinical and Basic Science).
- Maibach, Howard; Steigleder, G.K. (1993). Pocket Atlas of Dermatology.
- Aly, Raza; Maibach, Howard (1998). Atlas of Infections of the Skin.
- Avalos, Javier; Maibach, Howard, eds. (1999). Dermatologic Botany (Dermatology: Clinical and Basic Science).
- Maibach, Howard, ed. (2001). Toxicology of Skin (Target Organ Toxicology Series).
- Maibach, Howard; Rovee, David T., eds. (2003). The Epidermis in Wound Healing.
- Berardesca, Enzo; Elsner, Peter; Fluhr, Joachim W.; Maibach, Howard, eds. (2004). Bioengineering of the Skin: Water and the Stratum Corneum, Second Edition.
- Hostynek, Jurij J.; Maibach, Howard (2004). Protective Gloves for Occupational Use (Dermatology: Clinical and Basic Science).
- Maibach, Howard; Shai, Avi (2005). Wound Healing and Ulcers of the Skin: Diagnosis and Therapy.
- Chew, Ai-Lean; Maibach, Howard (2005). Irritant Dermatitis.
- Berardesca, Enzo; Leveque, Jean-Luc; Maibach, Howard, eds. (2006). Ethnic Skin and Hair (Dermatology: Clinical and Basic Science, 28).
- Hostynek, Jurij J.; Maibach, Howard (2006). Copper and the Skin (Dermatology: Clinical and Basic Science).
- Maibach, Howard (2011). A Dermatological View: from Physiology to Therapy.
- Gorouhi, Farzam; Maibach, Howard (2011). Evidence Based Dermatology, Second Edition.
- Maibach, Howard; Wilhelm, Peter; Zhai, Hongbo, eds. (2012). Dermatotoxicology, Eighth Edition.
- Aly, Raza; Maibach, Howard (2012). Skin Microbiology: Relevance to Clinical Infection.
- Maibach, Howard; Murthy, S. Narasimha, eds. (2012). Topical Nail Products and Ungual Drug Delivery.
- Berardesca, Enzo; Maibach, Howard; Wilhelm, Klaus-Peter, eds. (2013). Non Invasive Diagnostic Techniques in Clinical Dermatology.
- Honari, Golara; Maibach, Howard (2014). Applied Dermatotoxicology: Clinical Aspects.
- Alikhan, Ali; Lachapelle, Jean-Marie; Maibach, Howard, eds. (2014). Textbook of Hand Eczema.
- Maibach, Howard; Thyssen, Jacob B., eds. (2014). Filaggrin: Basic Science, Epidemiology, Clinical Aspects and Management.
- Jenner, John; Maibach, Howard; Sha, Vinod P., eds. (2015). Topical Drug Bioavailability, Bioequivalence, and Penetration, Second Edition.
- Knaak, James B.; Maibach, Howard; Wang, Rhoda G.M. (2017). Health Risk Assessment: Dermal and Inhalation Exposure and Absorption of Toxicants (CRC Press Revivals).
- Dragicevic, Nina; Maibach, Howard, eds. (2017). Percutaneous Penetration Enhancers: Drug Penetration Into/Through the Skin.
- Eskes, Chantra; Maibach, Howard; van Vliet, Erwin, eds. (2017). Alternatives for Dermal Toxicity Testing.
- Maibach, Howard; Vashi, Neelam A., eds. (2017). Dermaanthropology of Ethnic Skin and Hair.
- Farage, Miranda A.; Maibach, Howard; Miller, Kenneth W., eds. (2017). Textbook of Aging Skin, Second Edition.
- Maibach, Howard; Tur, Ethel, eds. (2018). Gender and Dermatology.
- Gimenez-Arnau, Ana M.; Maibach, Howard, eds. (2018). Contact Urticaria Syndrome: Diagnosis and Management (Updates in Clinical Dermatology).
- Lachapelle, Jean-Marie; Maibach, Howard, eds. (2019). Patch Testing and Prick Testing: A Practical Guide (Official Publication of the ICDRG).
- Maibach, Howard; Marzulli, Francis N., eds. (2019). Dermatotoxicology Methods: The Laboratory Worker's Ready Reference.
- Maibach, Howard; Zhu, Hanjiang, eds. (2019). Skin Decontamination: A Comprehensive Clinical Research Guide.
- Cary, John Havens; Maibach, Howard (2020). Rosacea (Updates in Clinical Dermatology).
- Hostynek, Jurij J.; Maibach, Howard (2020). Nickel and the Skin: Absorption, Immunology, Epidemiology, and Metallurgy (Routledge Revivals).
- Alavi, Afsaneh; Maibach, Howard (2020). Local Wound Care for Dermatologists (Updates in Clinical Dermatology).
- Maibach, Howard; O'Malley, Michael A.; Penagos, Homero A., eds. (2020). Pesticide Dermatoses (Routledge Revivals).
- Hannuksela, Matti; Kauppinen, Kristi; Maibach, Howard, eds. (2020). Skin Reactions to Drugs (Dermatology: Clinical & Base Science Book 15).
- Maibach, Howard; Sivamani, Raja K.; Stoeber, Boris, eds. (2020). Microneedling in Clinical Practice.
- Berardesca, Enzo; Elsner, Peter; Maibach, Howard; Wilhelm, Klaus-Peter, eds. (2020). Bioengineering of the Skin: Methods and Instrumentation, Volume III (Dermatology: Clinical & Basic Science Book 9).
- Johansen, Jeanne Dubs; John, Swen Malte; Maibach, Howard; Rustemeyer, Thomas, eds. (2020). Kanerva's Occupational Dermatology, Third Edition.
- Li, Becky S.; Maibach, Howard, eds. (2021). Ethnic Skin and Hair and Other Cultural Considerations (Updates in Clinical Dermatology).
- Feschuk, Aileen M.; Law, Rebecca M.; Maibach, Howard, eds. (2022). Dermal Absorption and Decontamination: A Comprehensive Guide.
- Barbaud, Annick; Bircher, Andrea J.; Brockow, Knut; Maibach, Howard, eds. (2022). Cutaneous Drug Hypersensitivity: Clinical Features, Mechanisms, Diagnosis, and Management.
- Dreher, Frank; Jungman, Elsa; Maibach, Howard; Sakamoto, Kazutami, eds. (2022). Handbook of Cosmetic Science and Technology, 5th Edition.
- Bronaugh, Robert L.; Maibach, Howard (2023). In Vitro Percutaneous Absorption: Principles, Fundamentals, and Applications.
- Archer, Clive B.; Maibach, Howard; Wakelin, Sarah H., eds. (2023). Handbook of Systemic Drug Treatment in Dermatology.
- Gimenez-Arnau, Ana M.; Maibach, Howard, eds. (2023). Handbook of Occupational Dermatoses (Updates in Clinical Dermatology).
- Maibach, Howard; Osman, Nily, eds. (2024). Cutaneous Biometrics.
- Baran, Robert; Maibach, Howard, eds. (2024). Textbook of Cosmetic Dermatology (Series in Cosmetic and Laser Therapy).
- AlEdani, Esraa M.; Maibach, Howard, eds. (2025). COVID-19 Vaccination and Dermatological Diseases (Updates in Clinical Dermatology).
- Ale, Iris S.; Maibach, Howard I. (2025). Irritant Contact Dermatitis. Springer Updates in Clinical Dermatology. Springer.
- AlEdani, Esraa M.; Maibach, Howard I. (2025). Nutrition and Acne Vulgaris. Springer Updates in Clinical Dermatology. Springer.
- Lauerma, Antti; Fyhrquist, Nanna; Maibach, Howard I.; Homey, Bernhard (2025). The Skin Microbiome Manual. Springer Updates in Clinical Dermatology. Springer.
- Law, Rebecca M.; Maibach, Howard I. (2026). Handbook of Topical Treatment in Dermatology. Springer Updates in Clinical Dermatology. Springer.
