= Maibach v. Regents of the University of California =

- Court: San Francisco County Superior Court
- Decided: November 6, 2025

Holding
- Writ of mandamus issued for production of records; petitioner found to be the prevailing party entitled to statutory attorney fees.

Maibach v. Regents of the University of California is a lawsuit seeking production of records and communications under the California Public Records Act, in the San Francisco County Superior Court. Dr. Howard Maibach alleges that the University of California, San Francisco (UCSF) improperly conducted a 2022 report regarding historical medical research, and improperly withheld public records that would provide insight into the university’s internal decision-making process.

The Court recently ordered UCSF to produce many of the withheld records demanded by Maibach and has set a hearing to determine legal fees owed by the University to Maibach for its actions.

== Background ==
Dr. Howard Maibach is a dermatologist and long-standing faculty member at UCSF who conducted research at the California Medical Facility in Vacaville during the 1960s and 1970s. Around 2021, a self-organized faculty "anti-racism task force" advocated by Dr. Rupa Marya demanded the university publicly denounce Maibach's past research practices. The group also demanded the university admit to profiting from research conducted on incarcerated individuals and called for Maibach’s resignation. Marya was later terminated by UCSF for her public actions, described as antisemitism.

In response to these internal pressures, UCSF established a “Program for Historical Reconciliation” (PHR). In December 2022, the PHR issued a report denouncing Dr Maibach’s work. Maibach has disputed these findings, asserting that his work was conducted with the approval of university and federal authorities and that participants provided informed consent consistent with the standards of the time.

== Litigation ==
In 2023, Maibach sued under the California Public Records Act (CPRA) and the California Constitution. The lawsuit sought to compel the University to release withheld internal records and communications related to the formation of the PHR and the conduct of its investigation.

Maibach’s legal filings alleged that the PHR investigation was procedurally flawed, biased, and that the university had improperly withheld public records. The University filed an anti-SLAPP motion to strike the petition, asserting that it had complied with the records requests and that its investigative process was protected activity.

== Court ruling ==
On November 6, 2025, the San Francisco Superior Court ruled substantially in favor of Maibach. The court found that the Regents of the University of California failed to meet the burden of proving that the documents withheld from the CPRA request were exempt from disclosure.

The court's order included:

- A writ of mandamus directing the Regents to produce public records and communications listed on its logs, with the exception of 26 records protected by attorney–client privilege.
- A determination that Maibach was the prevailing party, entitling him to an award of costs and reasonable attorney’s fees under Government Code § 7923.115.

The litigation concluded without an appeal by the UC Regents, resulting in the release of the records and awarding $804,350 in attorney's fees and costs to Maibach.
