= Axtbach =

River in Germany

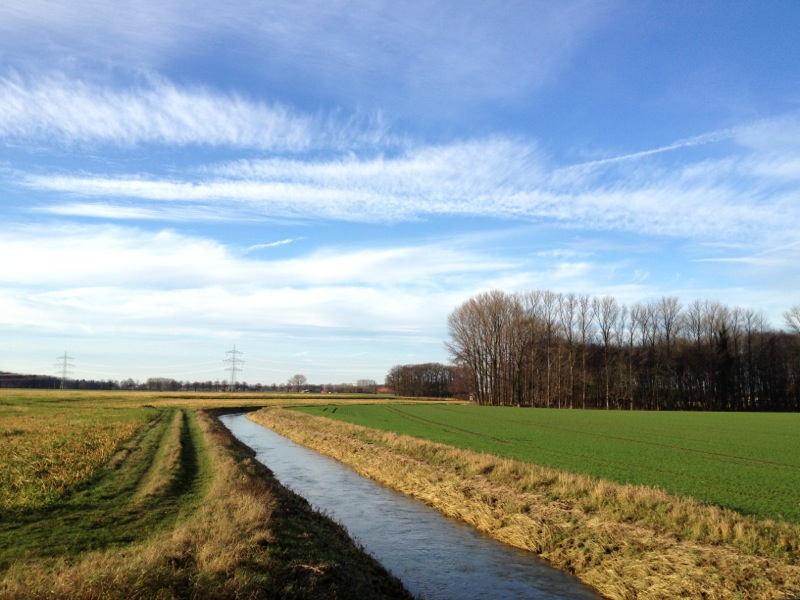

- Location of mouth

Location
- Country: Germany
- State: North Rhine-Westphalia

Physical characteristics
- Mouth
  - location: Ems
  - coordinates: 51.9542°N 8.0356°E
- Length: 34.2 km (21.3 mi)
- Basin size: 240 km^{2} (93 sq mi)

Basin features
- Progression: Ems→ North Sea

The Axtbach is a river of North Rhine-Westphalia, Germany. It flows into the Ems near Warendorf. The Axtbach is approximately 19 miles long from headwater to mouth. The headwaters of Axtbach come from an unnamed waterway in the city of Oelde combining with Mülenbach.

== See also ==
- List of rivers of North Rhine-Westphalia
