= Presidency of Gerald Ford =

U.S. presidential administration from 1974 to 1977

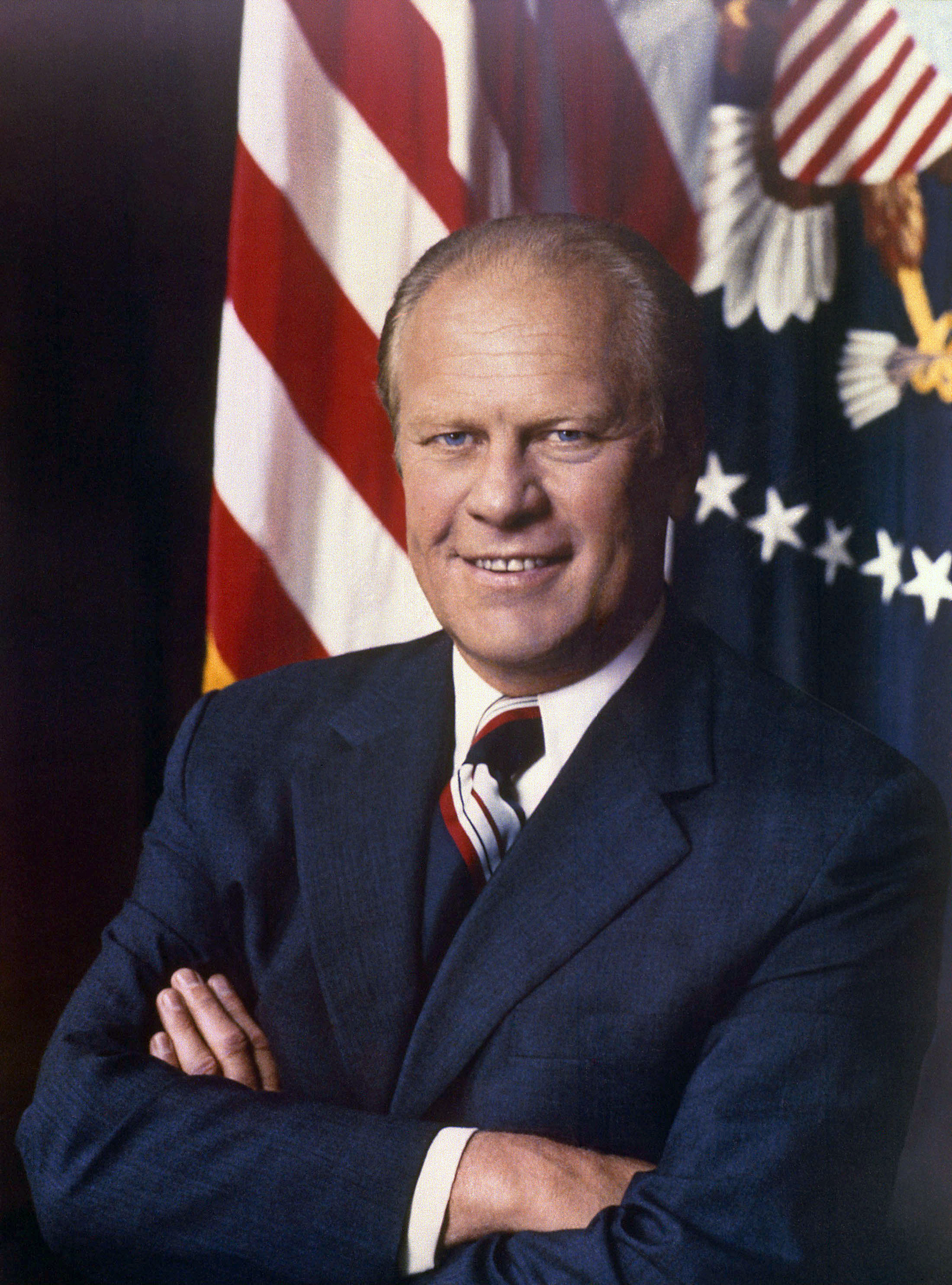
- Official portrait, 1974
- Presidency of Gerald Ford; August 9, 1974 – January 20, 1977
- Vice President: None (Aug–Dec 1974); Nelson Rockefeller (1974–1977)
- Cabinet: See list
- Party: Republican
- Seat: White House
- Seal of the President

Gerald Ford's tenure as the 38th president of the United States began on August 9, 1974, upon the resignation of President Richard Nixon, and ended on January 20, 1977. Ford, a Republican from Michigan, had been appointed vice president on December 6, 1973, following the resignation of Spiro Agnew from that office. Ford was the only person to serve as president without being elected to either the presidency or the vice presidency. His presidency ended following his narrow defeat in the 1976 presidential election to Democrat Jimmy Carter, after a period of 895 days in office. His 895-day presidency remains the shortest of all U.S. presidents who did not die in office.

Ford took office in the aftermath of the Watergate scandal and in the final stages of the Vietnam War, both of which engendered a new disillusion in American political institutions. Ford's first major act upon taking office was to grant a presidential pardon to Nixon for his role in the Watergate scandal, prompting a major backlash to Ford's presidency. He also created a conditional clemency program for Vietnam War draft dodgers.

Much of Ford's focus in domestic policy was on the economy, which experienced a recession during his tenure. After initially promoting a tax increase designed to combat inflation, Ford championed a tax cut designed to rejuvenate the economy, and he signed two tax reduction acts into law. The foreign policy of the Ford administration was characterized in procedural terms by the increased role Congress began to play, and by the corresponding curb on the powers of the president. Overcoming significant congressional opposition, Ford continued Nixon's détente policies with the Soviet Union.

In the 1976 presidential election, Ford was challenged by Ronald Reagan, a leader of the conservative wing of the Republican Party. After a contentious series of primaries, Ford narrowly won the nomination at the 1976 Republican National Convention. In the general election, Ford lost to Carter by a narrow margin in the popular and electoral vote. In polls of historians and political scientists, Ford is generally ranked as a below average president, much like both his predecessor and successor.

== Accession ==
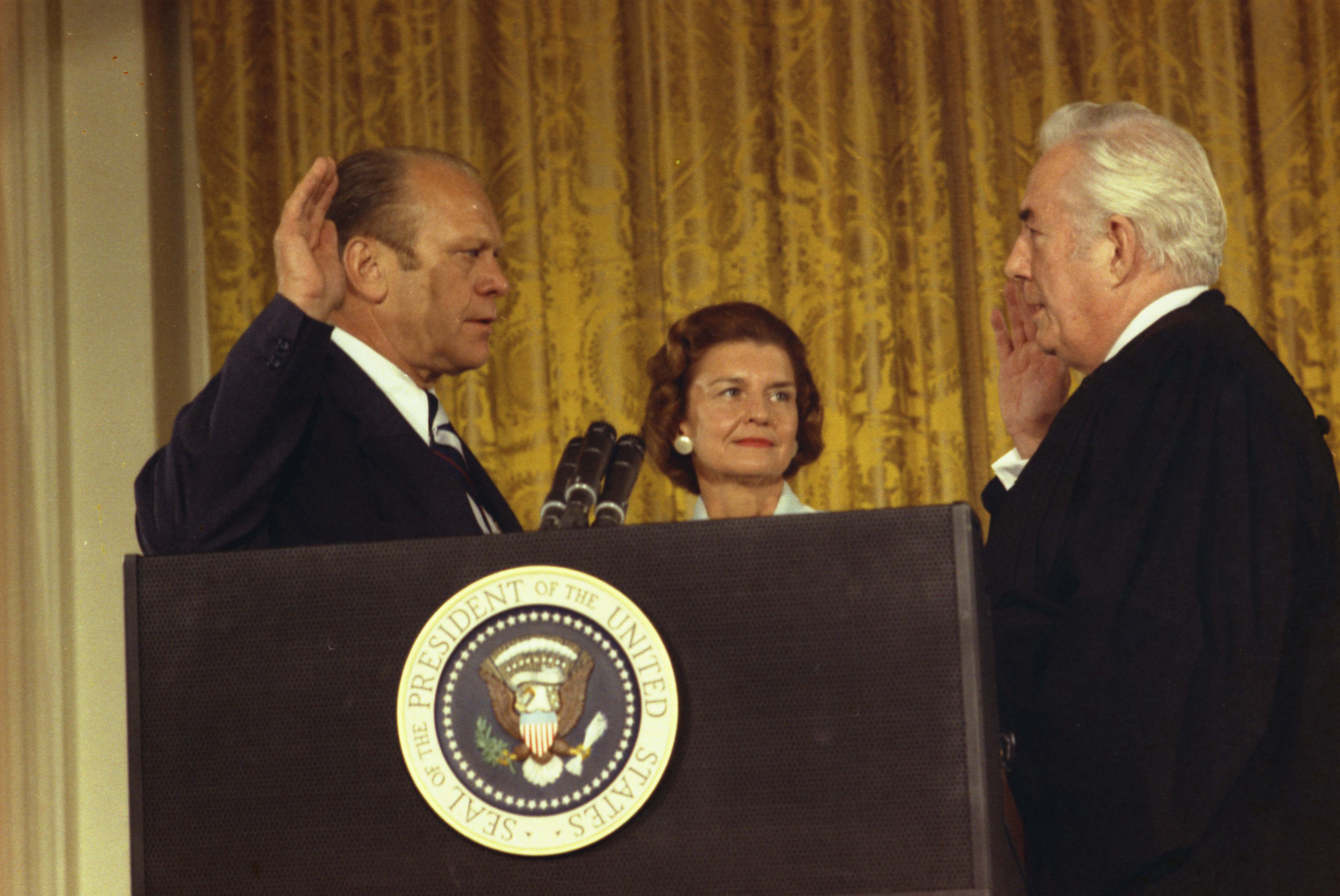
Gerald Ford is sworn in as the 38th President of the United States by Chief Justice Warren Burger in the White House East Room, while Betty Ford looks on.

The Republican ticket of President Richard Nixon and Vice President Spiro Agnew won a landslide victory in the 1972 presidential election. Nixon's second term was dominated by the Watergate scandal, which stemmed from a Nixon campaign group's attempted burglary of the Democratic National Committee's headquarters and the subsequent cover-up by the Nixon administration. Due to a scandal unrelated to Watergate, Vice President Agnew resigned on October 10, 1973. Under the terms of the Twenty-fifth Amendment, Nixon nominated Ford as Agnew's replacement. Nixon selected Ford, then the House Minority Leader and representative from Michigan's 5th congressional district, largely because he was advised that Ford would be the most easily confirmed of the prominent Republican leaders. Ford was confirmed by overwhelming majorities in both houses of Congress, and he took office as vice president in December 1973.

In the months after his confirmation as vice president, Ford continued to support Nixon's innocence with regards to Watergate, even as evidence mounted that the Nixon administration had ordered the break-in and subsequently sought to cover it up. In July 1974, after the Supreme Court ordered Nixon to turn over recordings of certain meetings he had held as president, the House Judiciary Committee voted to begin impeachment proceedings against Nixon. After the tapes became public and clearly showed that Nixon had taken part in the cover-up, Nixon summoned Ford to the Oval Office on August 8, where Nixon informed Ford that he would resign. Nixon formally resigned on August 9, making Ford the first President of the United States who had not been elected as either president or vice president.

Immediately after taking the oath of office in the East Room of the White House, Ford spoke to the assembled audience in a speech broadcast live to the nation. Ford noted the peculiarity of his position: "I am acutely aware that you have not elected me as your president by your ballots, and so I ask you to confirm me as your president with your prayers." He went on to state:

I have not sought this enormous responsibility, but I will not shirk it. Those who nominated and confirmed me as Vice President were my friends and are my friends. They were of both parties, elected by all the people and acting under the Constitution in their name. It is only fitting then that I should pledge to them and to you that I will be the President of all the people.

== Administration ==
=== Cabinet ===
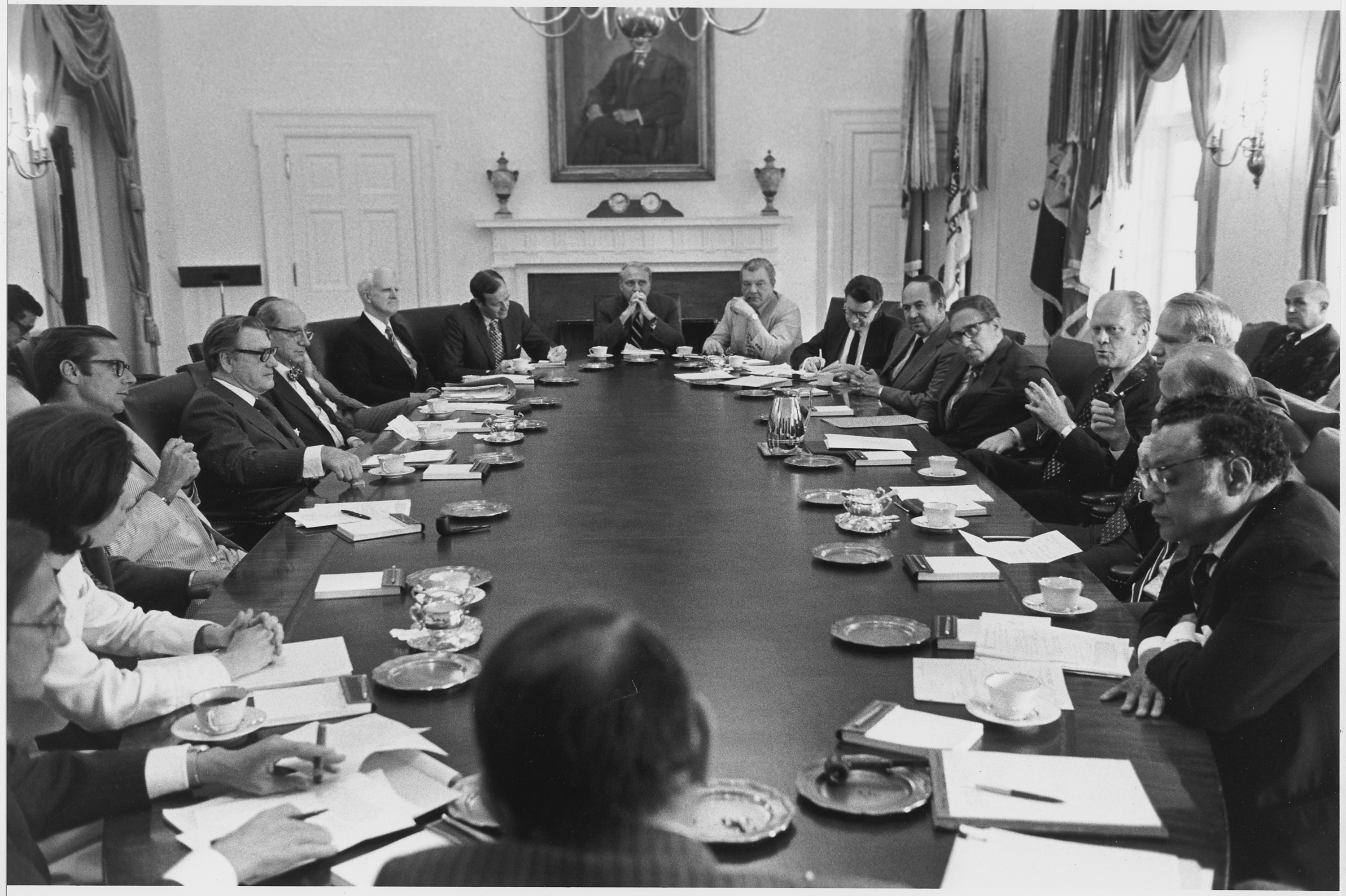
President Ford and his cabinet in June 1975

Ford cabinet
Office	Name	Term
President	Gerald Ford	1974–1977
Vice President	none	1974
Nelson Rockefeller	1974–1977
Secretary of State	Henry Kissinger	1974–1977
Secretary of the Treasury	William E. Simon	1974–1977
Secretary of Defense	James R. Schlesinger	1974–1975
Donald Rumsfeld	1975–1977
Attorney General	William B. Saxbe	1974–1975
Edward H. Levi	1975–1977
Secretary of the Interior	Rogers Morton	1974–1975
Stanley K. Hathaway	1975
Thomas S. Kleppe	1975–1977
Secretary of Agriculture	Earl Butz	1974–1976
John A. Knebel	1976–1977
Secretary of Commerce	Frederick B. Dent	1974–1975
Rogers Morton	1975–1976
Elliot Richardson	1976–1977
Secretary of Labor	Peter J. Brennan	1974–1975
John T. Dunlop	1975–1976
William Usery Jr.	1976–1977
Secretary of Health, Education, and Welfare	Caspar Weinberger	1974–1975
F. David Mathews	1975–1977
Secretary of Housing and Urban Development	James T. Lynn	1974–1975
Carla Anderson Hills	1975–1977
Secretary of Transportation	Claude Brinegar	1974–1975
William T. Coleman Jr.	1975–1977
Director of the Office of Management and Budget	Roy Ash	1974–1975
James T. Lynn	1975–1977
United States Trade Representative	William D. Eberle	1974
Frederick B. Dent	1975–1977
Ambassador to the United Nations	John A. Scali	1974–1975
Daniel Patrick Moynihan	1975–1976
William Scranton	1976–1977
White House Chief of Staff	Alexander Haig	1974
Donald Rumsfeld	1974–1975
Dick Cheney	1975–1977
Counselor to the President	Anne Armstrong	1974
Dean Burch	1974
Kenneth Rush	1974
Robert T. Hartmann	1974–1977
John O. Marsh Jr.	1974–1977
Rogers Morton	1976
White House Counsel	Philip W. Buchen	1974–1977

Upon assuming office, Ford inherited Nixon's cabinet, although Ford quickly replaced Chief of Staff Alexander Haig with Donald Rumsfeld, who had served as a Counselor to the President under Nixon. Rumsfeld and Deputy Chief of Staff Dick Cheney rapidly became among the most influential people in the Ford administration. Ford also appointed Edward H. Levi as Attorney General, charging Levi with cleaning up a Justice Department that had been politicized to unprecedented levels during the Nixon administration. Ford brought in Philip W. Buchen, Robert T. Hartmann, L. William Seidman, and John O. Marsh as senior advisers with cabinet rank. Ford placed a far greater value in his cabinet officials than Nixon had, though cabinet members did not regain the degree of influence they had held prior to World War II. Levi, Secretary of State and National Security Adviser Henry Kissinger, Secretary of the Treasury William E. Simon, and Secretary of Defense James R. Schlesinger all emerged as influential cabinet officials early in Ford's tenure.

Most of the Nixon holdovers in cabinet stayed in place until Ford's dramatic reorganization in the fall of 1975, an action referred to by political commentators as the "Halloween Massacre". Ford appointed George H. W. Bush as Director of the Central Intelligence Agency, while Rumsfeld became Secretary of Defense and Cheney replaced Rumsfeld as Chief of Staff, becoming the youngest individual to hold that position. The moves were intended to fortify Ford's right flank against a primary challenge from Ronald Reagan. Though Kissinger remained as Secretary of State, Brent Scowcroft replaced Kissinger as National Security Advisor.

=== Vice presidency ===
Ford's accession to the presidency left the office of vice president vacant. On August 20, 1974, Ford nominated Nelson Rockefeller, the leader of the party's liberal wing, for the vice presidency. Rockefeller and former Representative George H. W. Bush from Texas were the two finalists for vice presidential nomination, and Ford chose Rockefeller in part due to a Newsweek report that revealed that Bush had accepted money from a Nixon slush fund during his 1970 Senate campaign. Rockefeller underwent extended hearings before Congress, which revealed that he had made personal contributions to government officials, including Kissinger. Although conservative Republicans were not pleased that Rockefeller was picked, most of them voted for his confirmation, and his nomination passed the Senate on December 10 and the House on December 19. He was sworn in as the nation's 41st vice president on December 19, 1974. Prior to Rockefeller's confirmation, Speaker of the House Carl Albert was next in line to the presidency. Ford promised to give Rockefeller a major role in shaping the domestic policy of the administration, but Rockefeller was quickly sidelined by Rumsfeld and other administration officials.

=== Executive privilege ===
In the wake of Nixon's heavy use of executive privilege to block investigations of his actions, Ford was scrupulous in minimizing its usage, aware of the mistrust that the Watergate scandal had fostered between the Presidency and other branches of government. Going so far as to avoid the use of the term 'executive privilege' and deliberately refusing to issue any formal policy on the use of it, Ford pursued a policy of openness, allowing Congress unprecedented access to the activities of both the FBI and CIA.

However, the lack of clarity on what exactly the executive could do weakened Ford's position, complicating his efforts to keep congressional investigations under control. Political scientist Mark J. Rozell concludes that while Ford's failure to enunciate a formal executive privilege policy made it more difficult to explain his position to Congress, his actions were prudent; his recognition that Congress would likely challenge any use of it likely prevented the erosion of executive privilege as a presidential power.

== Judicial appointments ==
Ford made one appointment to the Supreme Court while in office, appointing John Paul Stevens to succeed Associate Justice William O. Douglas. Upon learning of Douglas's impending retirement, Ford asked Attorney General Levi to submit a short list of potential Supreme Court nominees, and Levi suggested Stevens, Solicitor General Robert Bork, and federal judge Arlin Adams. Ford chose Stevens, an uncontroversial federal appellate judge, largely because he was likely to face the least opposition in the Senate. Early in his tenure on the Court, Stevens had a relatively moderate voting record, but by the mid-1990s he had emerged as the leader of the Court's liberal bloc. In 2005 Ford wrote, "I am prepared to allow history's judgment of my term in office to rest (if necessary, exclusively) on my nomination 30 years ago of Justice John Paul Stevens to the U.S. Supreme Court". Ford also appointed 11 judges to the United States Courts of Appeals, and 50 judges to the United States district courts.

== Domestic affairs ==
=== Nixon pardon ===
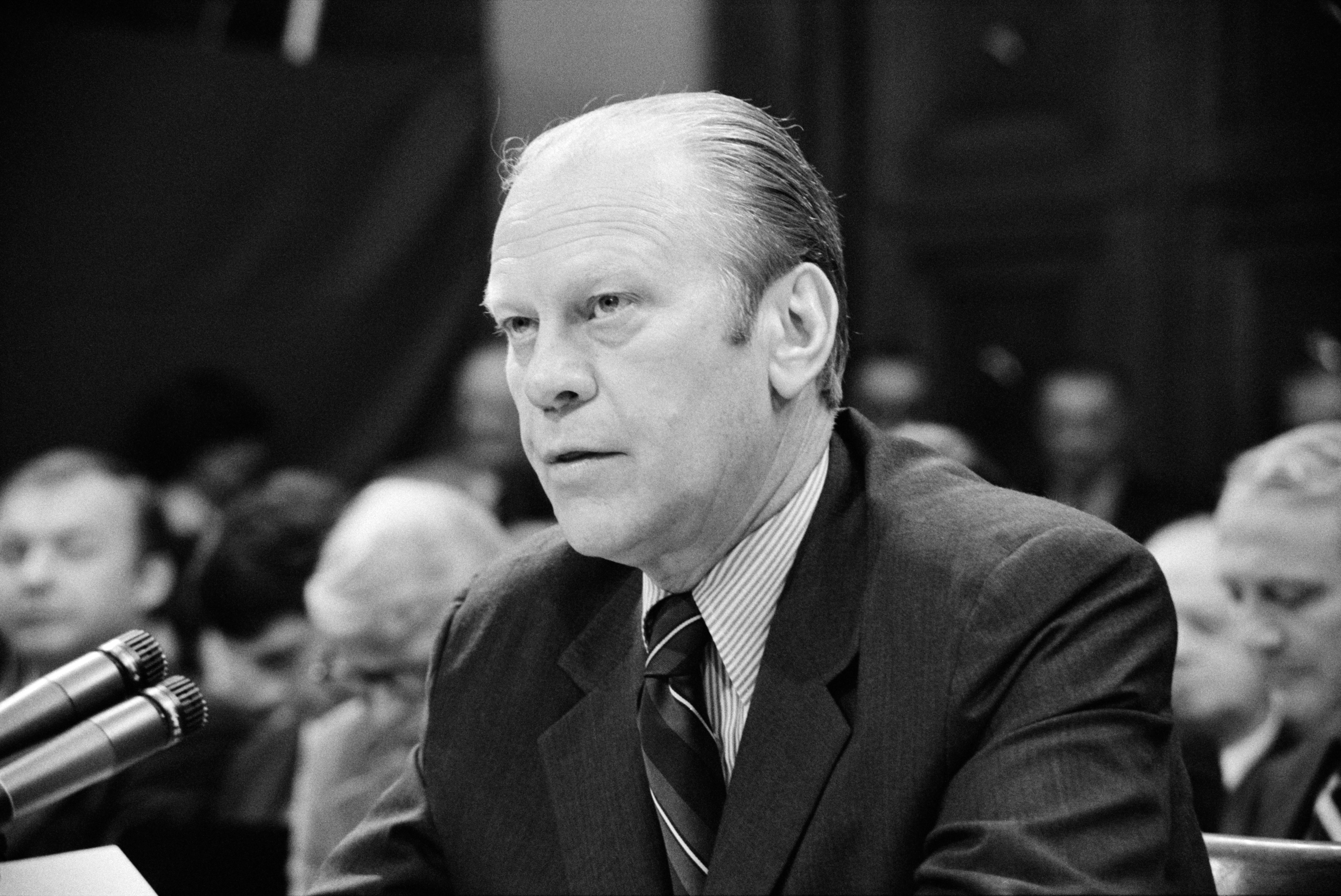
President Ford appears at a House Judiciary Subcommittee hearing regarding his pardon of Richard Nixon

Along with the experience of the Vietnam War and other issues, Watergate contributed to a decline in the faith that Americans placed in political institutions. Low public confidence added to Ford's already formidable challenge of establishing his own administration without a presidential transition period or the popular mandate of a presidential election. Though Ford became widely popular during his first month in office, he faced a difficult situation regarding the fate of former President Nixon, whose status threatened to undermine the Ford administration. In the final days of Nixon's presidency, Haig had floated the possibility of Ford pardoning Nixon, but no deal had been struck between Nixon and Ford before Nixon's resignation. Nonetheless, when Ford took office, most of the Nixon holdovers in the executive branch, including Haig and Kissinger, pressed for a pardon. Through his first month in office, Ford publicly kept his options open regarding a pardon, but he came to believe that ongoing legal proceedings against Nixon would prevent his administration from addressing any other issue. Ford attempted to extract a public statement of contrition from Nixon before issuing the pardon, but Nixon refused.

On September 8, 1974, Ford issued Proclamation 4311, which gave Nixon a full and unconditional pardon for any crimes he might have committed against the United States while president. In a televised broadcast to the nation, Ford explained that he felt the pardon was in the best interests of the country, and that the Nixon family's situation "is a tragedy in which we all have played a part. It could go on and on and on, or someone must write the end to it. I have concluded that only I can do that, and if I can, I must."

The Nixon pardon was highly controversial, and Gallup polling showed that Ford's approval rating fell from 71 percent before the pardon to 50 percent immediately after the pardon. Critics derided the move and said a "corrupt bargain" had been struck between the men. In an editorial at the time, The New York Times stated that the Nixon pardon was a "profoundly unwise, divisive and unjust act" that in a stroke had destroyed the new president's "credibility as a man of judgment, candor and competence". Ford's close friend and press secretary, Jerald terHorst, resigned his post in protest. The pardon would hang over Ford for the remainder of his presidency, and damaged his relationship with members of Congress from both parties. Against the advice of most of his advisers, Ford agreed to appear before a House Subcommittee that requested further information on the pardon. On October 17, 1974, Ford testified before a House subcommittee, becoming the first sitting president to testify before a congressional committee since Woodrow Wilson.

After Ford left the White House, the former president privately justified his pardon of Nixon by carrying in his wallet a portion of the text of Burdick v. United States, a 1915 Supreme Court decision which stated that a pardon indicated a presumption of guilt, and that acceptance of a pardon was tantamount to a confession of that guilt.

=== Clemency for draft dodgers ===
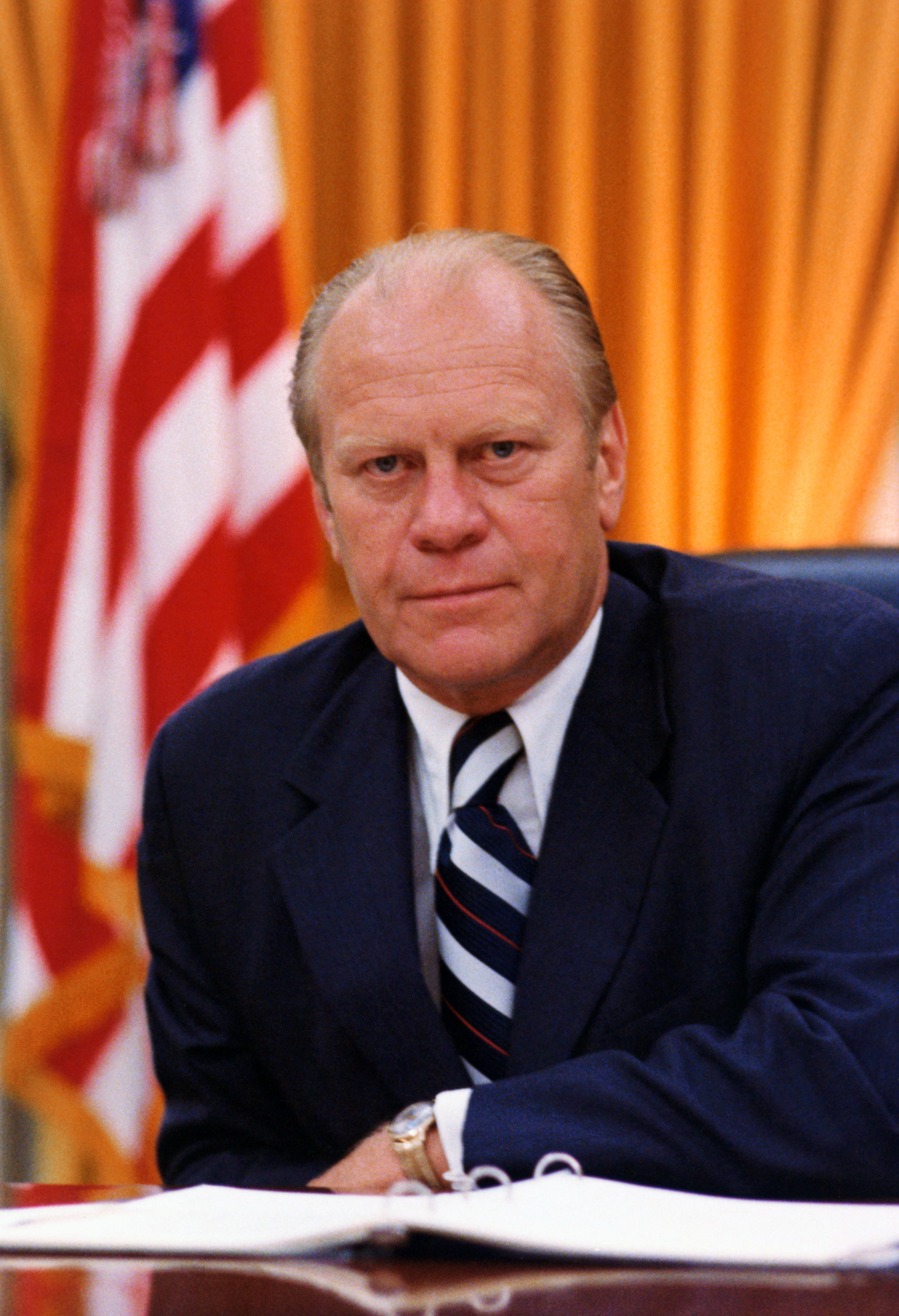
Ford in the Oval Office, 1974

During the Vietnam War, about one percent of American men of eligible age for the draft failed to register, and approximately one percent of those who were drafted refused to serve. Those who refused conscription were labeled as "draft dodgers"; many such individuals had left the country for Canada, but others remained in the United States. Ford had opposed any form of amnesty for the draft dodgers while in Congress, but his presidential advisers convinced him that a clemency program would help resolve a contentious issue and boost Ford's public standing. On September 16, 1974, shortly after he announced the Nixon pardon, Ford introduced a presidential clemency program for Vietnam War draft dodgers. The conditions of the clemency required a reaffirmation of allegiance to the United States and up to two years of work in a public service position. The program for the Return of Vietnam Era Draft Evaders and Military Deserters established a Clemency Board to review the records and make recommendations for receiving presidential clemency and a change in military discharge status. Ford's clemency program was accepted by most conservatives, but attacked by those on the left who wanted a full amnesty program. Full pardon for draft dodgers would later come in the Carter Administration.

=== 1974 midterm elections ===
The 1974 congressional midterm elections took place less than three months after Ford assumed office. The Democratic Party turned voter dissatisfaction into large gains in the House of Representatives elections, taking 49 seats from the Republican Party, increasing their majority to 291 of the 435 seats. Even Ford's former House seat had been won by a Democrat, in a February 1974 special election. In the Senate elections, the Democrats increased their majority to 60 seats in the 100-seat body (61 from September 1975). The subsequent 94th Congress would override the highest percentage of vetoes since Andrew Johnson served as president in the 1860s. Ford's successful vetoes, however, resulted in the lowest yearly spending increases since the Eisenhower administration. Buoyed by the new class of "Watergate Babies," liberal Democrats implemented reforms designed to ease the passage of legislation. The House began to select committee chairs by secret ballot rather than through seniority, resulting in the removal of some conservative Southern committee chairs. The Senate, meanwhile, lowered the number of votes necessary to end a filibuster from 67 to 60.

Ford was at odds with the liberal Democratic majority in Congress during his presidency, as he reflected in his autobiography:

In 1949, when I arrived in Washington, President Truman was a moderate-to-liberal Democrat who had struggled with a conservative Republican Eightieth Congress. He wanted to spend, and we Republicans wanted to save. Here I was in 1974, a conservative-to-moderate Republican about to struggle with a liberal Democratic Congress. The President wanted to save, and the Congress wanted to spend. Well, Truman had won a good share of his battles on Capitol Hill. With any luck, I would too.

=== Economy ===
Federal finances and GDP during Ford's presidency
Fiscal Year	Receipts	Outlays	Surplus/ Deficit	GDP	Debt as a % of GDP
1975	279.1	332.3	–53.2	1,606.9	24.6
1976	298.1	371.8	–73.7	1,786.1	26.7
TQ	81.2	96.0	–14.7	471.7	26.3
1977	355.6	409.2	–53.7	2,024.3	27.1
Ref.					

By the time Ford took office, the U.S. economy had entered into a period of stagflation, which economists attributed to various causes, including the 1973 oil crisis and increasing competition from countries such as Japan. Stagflation confounded the traditional economic theories of the 1970s, as economists generally believed that an economy would not simultaneously experience inflation and low rates of economic growth. Traditional economic remedies for a dismal economic growth rate, such as tax cuts and increased spending, risked exacerbating inflation. The conventional response to inflation, tax increases and a cut in government spending, risked damaging the economy. The economic troubles, which signaled the end of the post-war boom, created an opening for a challenge to the dominant Keynesian economics, and laissez-faire advocates such as Alan Greenspan acquired influence within the Ford administration. Ford seized the initiative, abandoned 40 years of orthodoxy, and introduced a new conservative economic agenda as he sought to adapt traditional Republican economics to deal with the novel economic challenges.

At the time that he took office, Ford believed that inflation, rather than a potential recession, represented the greatest threat to the economy. He believed that inflation could be reduced, not by reducing the amount of new currency entering circulation, but by encouraging people to reduce their spending. In October 1974, Ford went before the American public and asked them to "Whip Inflation Now". As part of this program, he urged people to wear "WIN" buttons. To try to mesh service and sacrifice, "WIN" called for Americans to reduce their spending and consumption, especially with regards to gasoline. Ford hoped that the public would respond to this call for self-restraint much as it had to President Franklin D. Roosevelt's calls for sacrifice during World War II, but the public received WIN with skepticism. At roughly the same time he rolled out WIN, Ford also proposed a ten-point economic plan. The central plank of the plan was a tax increase on corporations and high earners, which Ford hoped would both quell inflation and cut into government's budget deficit.

Ford's economic focus changed as the country sank into the worst recession since the Great Depression. In November 1974, Ford withdrew his proposed tax increase. Two months later, Ford proposed a 1-year tax reduction of $16 billion to stimulate economic growth, along with spending cuts to avoid inflation. Having switched from advocating for a tax increase to advocating a tax reduction in just two months, Ford was greatly criticized for his "flip-flop". Congress responded by passing a plan that implemented deeper tax cuts and an increase in government spending. Ford seriously considered vetoing the bill, but ultimately chose to sign the Tax Reduction Act of 1975 into law. In October 1975, Ford introduced a bill designed to combat inflation through a mix of tax and spending cuts. That December, Ford signed the Revenue Adjustment Act of 1975, which implemented tax and spending cuts, albeit not at the levels proposed by Ford. The economy recovered in 1976, as both inflation and unemployment declined. Nonetheless, by late 1976 Ford faced considerable discontent over his handling of the economy, and the government had a $74 billion deficit.

=== Rockefeller Commission ===
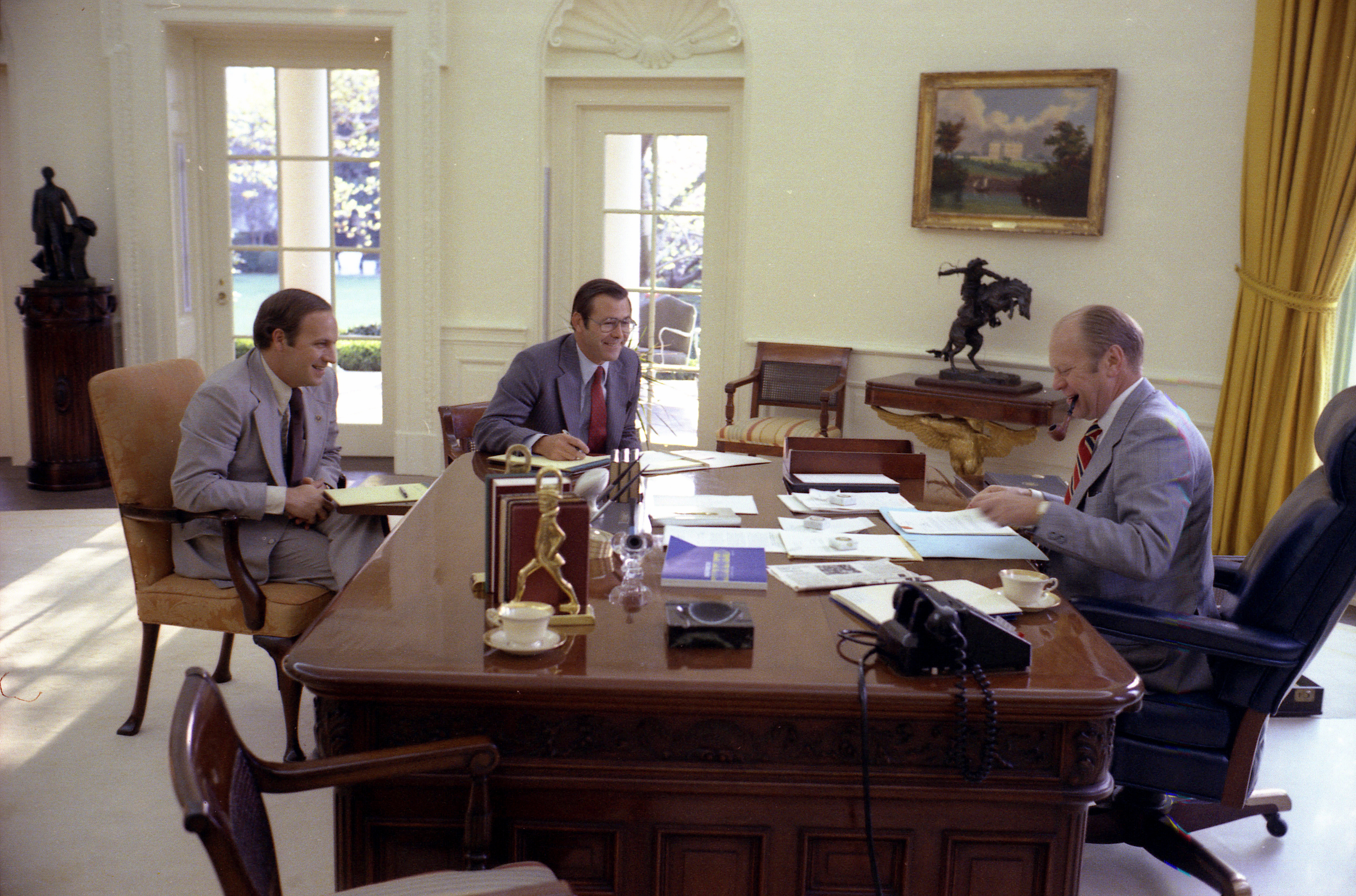
L to R: Dick Cheney, Donald Rumsfeld and President Ford in the Oval Office, 1975

Prior to Ford's presidency, the Central Intelligence Agency (CIA) had illegally assembled files on domestic anti-war activists. In the aftermath of Watergate, CIA Director William Colby put together a report of all of the CIA's domestic activities, and much of the report became public, beginning with the publication of a December 1974 article by investigative journalist Seymour Hersh. The revelations sparked outrage among the public and members of Congress. In response to growing pressure to investigate and reform the CIA, Ford created the Rockefeller Commission. The Rockefeller Commission marked the first time that a presidential commission was established to investigate the national security apparatus. The Rockefeller Commission's report, submitted in June 1975, generally defended the CIA, although it did note that "the CIA has engaged in some activities that should be criticized and not permitted to happen again." The press strongly criticized the commission for failing to include a section on the CIA's assassination plots. The Senate created its own committee, led by Senator Frank Church, to investigate CIA abuses. Ford feared that the Church Committee would be used for partisan purposes and resisted turning over classified materials, but Colby cooperated with the committee. In response to the Church Committee's report, both houses of Congress established select committees to provide oversight to the intelligence community.

=== Environment ===
Due to the frustration of environmentalists left over from the Nixon days, including Environmental Protection Agency head Russell E. Train, environmentalism was a peripheral issue during the Ford years. The "Sagebrush Rebellion", a movement of western ranchers and other groups that opposed federal control of public lands, lost repeatedly in the federal courts, most notably in the 1976 Supreme Court decision of Kleppe v. New Mexico, in which Secretary of the Interior Thomas S. Kleppe was the federal party. Ford's successes included the addition of two national monuments, six historical sites, three historic parks and two national preserves. None were controversial. In the international field, treaties and agreements with Canada, Mexico, China, Japan, the Soviet Union and several European countries included provisions to protect endangered species.

=== Social issues ===
Ford and his wife were outspoken supporters of the Equal Rights Amendment (ERA), a proposed constitutional amendment that had been submitted to the states for ratification in 1972. The ERA was designed to ensure equal rights for all citizens regardless of gender. Despite Ford's support, the ERA would fail to win ratification by the necessary number of state legislatures.

As president, Ford's position on abortion was that he supported "a federal constitutional amendment that would permit each one of the 50 States to make the choice". This had also been his position as House Minority Leader in response to the 1973 Supreme Court case of Roe v. Wade, which he opposed. Ford came under criticism for a 60 Minutes interview his wife Betty gave in 1975, in which she stated that Roe v. Wade was a "great, great decision". During his later life, Ford would identify as pro-choice.

=== Campaign finance ===
After the 1972 elections, good government groups like Common Cause pressured Congress to amend campaign finance law to restrict the role of money in political campaigns. In 1974, Congress approved amendments to the Federal Election Campaign Act, establishing the Federal Election Commission to oversee campaign finance laws. The amendments also established a system of public financing for presidential elections, limited the size of campaign contributions, limited the amount of money that candidates could spend on their own campaigns, and required the disclosure of nearly all campaign contributions. Ford reluctantly signed the bill into law in October 1974. In the 1976 case of Buckley v. Valeo, the Supreme Court overturned the cap on self-funding by political candidates, holding that such a restriction violated freedom of speech rights. The campaign finance reforms of the 1970s were largely unsuccessful in lessening the influence of money in politics, as more contributions shifted to political action committees and state and local party committees.

=== Court ordered busing to desegregate public schools ===
In 1971, the United States Supreme Court ruled in Swann v. Charlotte-Mecklenburg Board of Education that "Busing was a permissible tool for desegregation purposes." However, in the closing days of the Nixon administration, the Supreme Court largely eliminated District Court ability to order busing across city and suburban systems in the case of Milliken v. Bradley. It meant that disgruntled white families could move to the suburbs and not be reached by court orders regarding segregation of the central city schools. Ford, representing a Michigan district, had always taken the position in favor of the goal of school desegregation but opposition to court-ordered forced busing as a means of achieving it. In the first major bill he signed as president, Ford's compromise solution was to win over the general population with mild anti-busing legislation. He condemned anti-busing violence, promoted the theoretical goal of school desegregation, and promised to uphold the Constitution. The problem did not go away – it only escalated and remained on the front burner for years. Tension exploded in Boston, where working-class Irish neighborhoods inside the city limits violently resisted court-ordered busing of black children into their schools.

=== Other domestic issues ===
When New York City faced bankruptcy in 1975, Mayor Abraham Beame was unsuccessful in obtaining Ford's support for a federal bailout. The incident prompted the New York Daily News' famous headline "Ford to City: Drop Dead", referring to a speech in which "Ford declared flatly ... that he would veto any bill calling for 'a federal bail-out of New York City'". The following month, November 1975, Ford changed his stance and asked Congress to approve federal loans to New York City, upon the condition that the city agree to more austere budgets imposed by Washington, D.C. In December 1975, Ford signed a bill providing New York City with access to $2.3 billion in loans.

Despite his reservations about how the program ultimately would be funded in an era of tight public budgeting, Ford signed the Education for All Handicapped Children Act of 1975, which established special education throughout the United States. Ford expressed "strong support for full educational opportunities for our handicapped children" upon signing the bill.

Ford was confronted with a potential swine flu pandemic. In the early 1970s, an influenza strain H1N1 shifted from a form of flu that affected primarily pigs and crossed over to humans. In February 1976, an army recruit at Fort Dix died; four other cases were initially identified, and health officials recommended that the population be vaccinated. Although the vaccination program was plagued by delays and public relations problems, nearly 25% of the population had been vaccinated by October, and the program was suspended in December 1976. The vaccine was alleged to have caused deaths.

== Foreign affairs ==
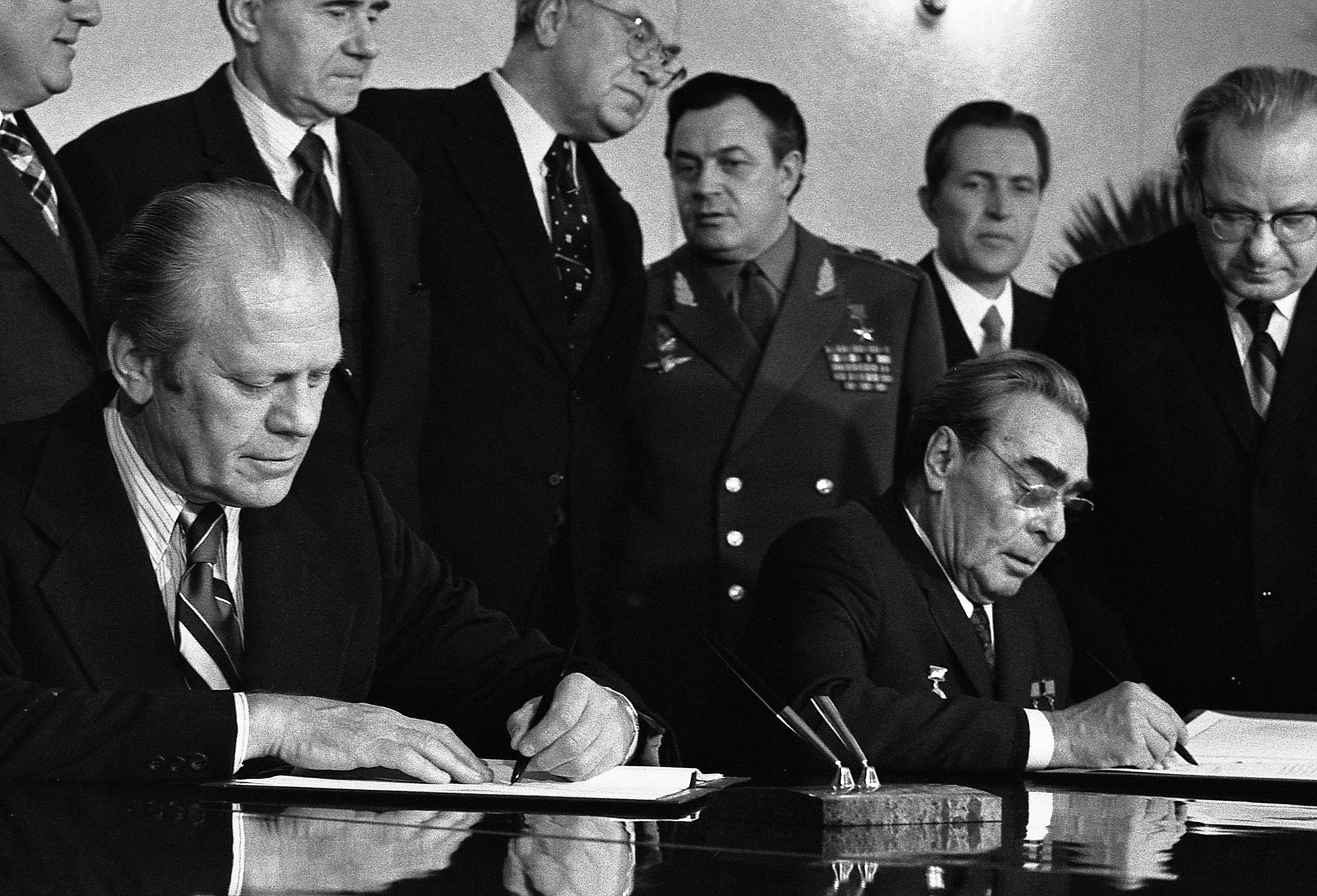
Ford meets with Soviet leader Leonid Brezhnev during the Vladivostok Summit, November 1974, to sign a joint communiqué on the SALT treaty

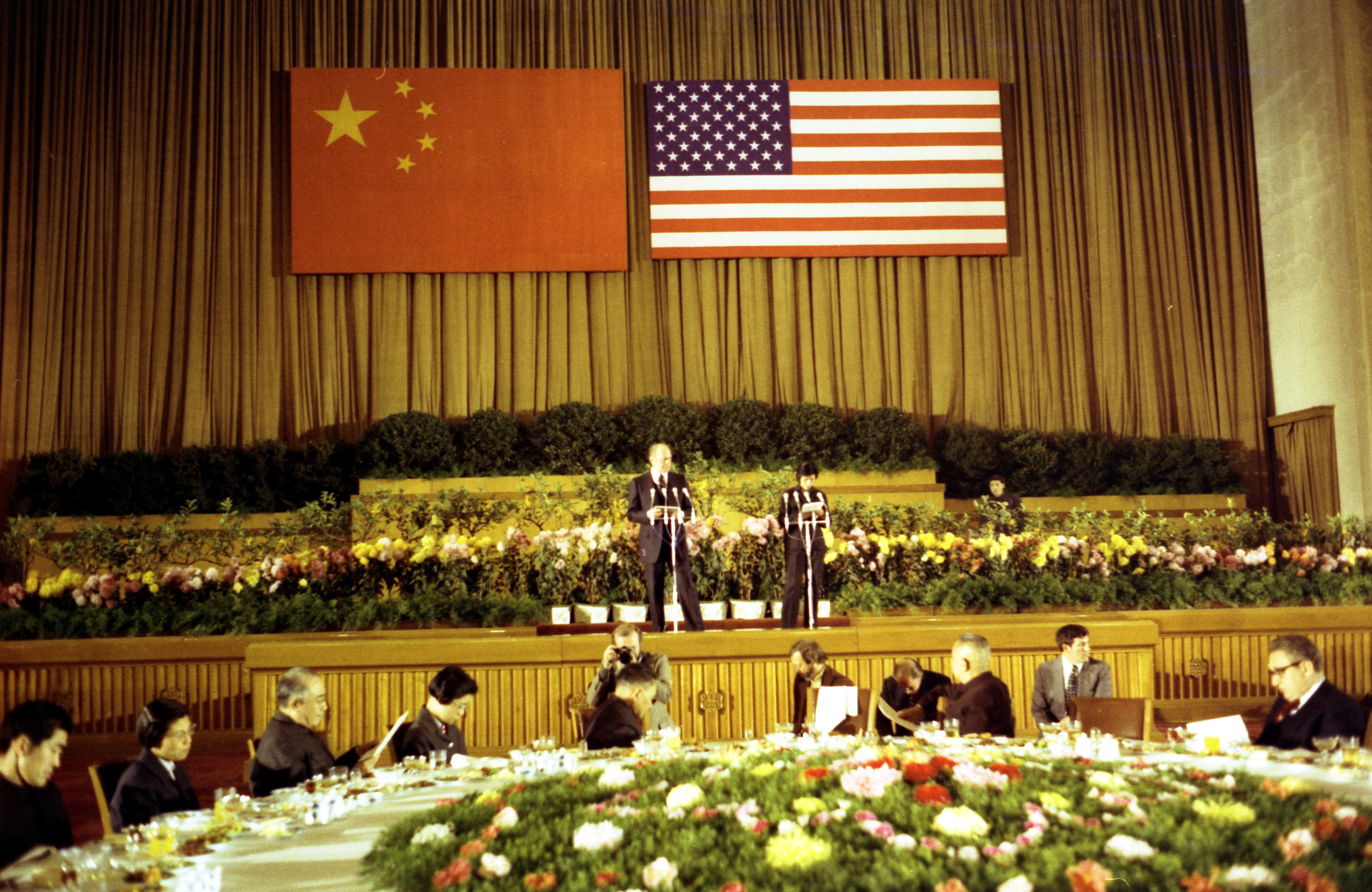
Ford makes remarks at a Reciprocal Dinner in Beijing on December 4, 1975.

=== Cold War ===
Ford continued Nixon's détente policy with both the Soviet Union and China, easing the tensions of the Cold War. In doing so, he overcame opposition from members of Congress, an institution which became increasingly assertive in foreign affairs in the early 1970s. This opposition was led by Senator Henry M. Jackson, who scuttled a U.S.–Soviet trade agreement by winning passage of the Jackson–Vanik amendment. The thawing relationship with China brought about by Nixon's 1972 visit to China was reinforced with another presidential visit in December 1975.

Despite the collapse of the trade agreement with the Soviet Union, Ford and Soviet Leader Leonid Brezhnev continued the Strategic Arms Limitation Talks, which had begun under Nixon. In 1972, the U.S. and the Soviet Union had reached the SALT I treaty, which placed upper limits on each power's nuclear arsenal. Ford met Brezhnev at the November 1974 Vladivostok Summit, at which point the two leaders agreed to a framework for another SALT treaty. Opponents of détente, led by Jackson, delayed Senate consideration of the treaty until after Ford left office.

==== Helsinki Accords ====
When Ford took office in August 1974, the Conference on Security and Cooperation in Europe (CSCE) negotiations had been underway in Helsinki, Finland, for nearly two years. Throughout much of the negotiations, U.S. leaders were disengaged and uninterested with the process; Kissinger told Ford in 1974 that "we never wanted it but we went along with the Europeans ... [i]t is meaningless—it is just a grandstand play to the left. We are going along with it." In the months leading up to the conclusion of negotiations and signing of the Helsinki Final Act in August 1975, Americans of Eastern European descent voiced their concerns that the agreement would mean the acceptance of Soviet domination over Eastern Europe and the permanent incorporation of the Baltic states into the USSR. Shortly before President Ford departed for Helsinki, he held a meeting with a delegation of Americans of Eastern European background, and stated definitively that U.S. policy on the Baltic States would not change, but would be strengthened since the agreement denies the annexation of territory in violation of international law and allows for the peaceful change of borders.

The American public remained unconvinced that American policy on the incorporation of the Baltic States would not be changed by the Helsinki Final Act. Despite protests from all around, Ford decided to move forward and sign the Helsinki Agreement. As domestic criticism mounted, Ford hedged on his support for the Helsinki Accords, which had the impact of overall weakening his foreign-policy stature. Though Ford was criticized for his apparent recognition of the Soviet domination of Eastern Europe, the new emphasis on human rights would eventually contribute to the weakening of the Eastern bloc in the 1980s and speed up its collapse in 1989.

=== Vietnam ===
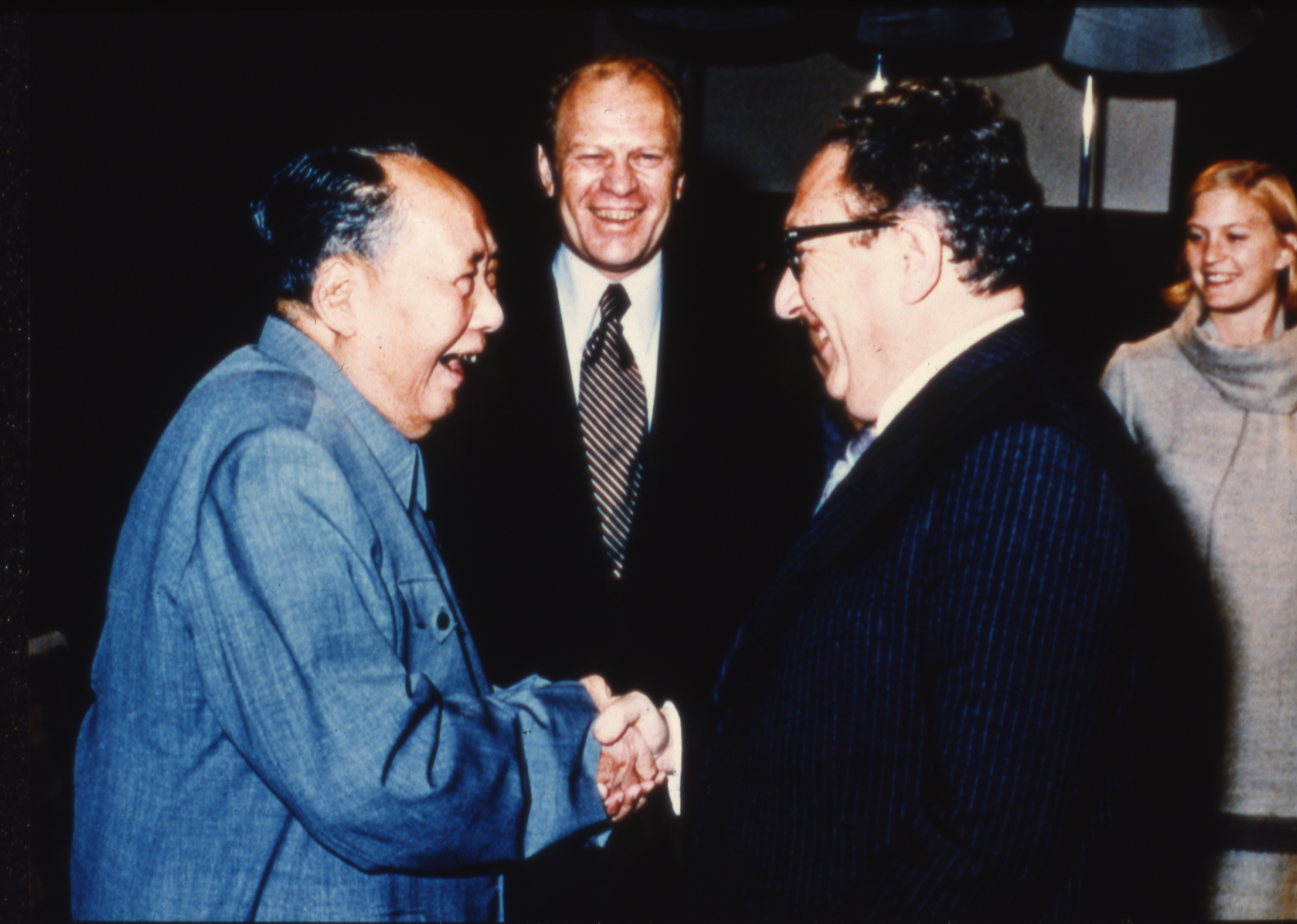
Ford and his daughter Susan watch as Henry Kissinger shakes hands with Mao Zedong, December 2, 1975

One of Ford's greatest challenges was dealing with the ongoing Vietnam War. American offensive operations against North Vietnam had ended with the Paris Peace Accords, signed on January 27, 1973. The accords declared a cease fire across both North and South Vietnam, and required the release of American prisoners of war. The agreement guaranteed the territorial integrity of Vietnam and, like the Geneva Conference of 1954, called for national elections in the North and South. South Vietnamese President Nguyen Van Thieu was not involved in the final negotiations, and publicly criticized the proposed agreement, but was pressured by Nixon and Kissinger into signing the agreement. In multiple letters to the South Vietnamese president, Nixon had promised that the United States would defend Thieu's government, should the North Vietnamese violate the accords.

Fighting in Vietnam continued after the withdrawal of most U.S. forces in early 1973. As North Vietnamese forces advanced in early 1975, Ford requested Congress approve a $722 million aid package for South Vietnam, funds that had been promised by the Nixon administration. Congress voted against the proposal by a wide margin. Senator Jacob K. Javits offered "...large sums for evacuation, but not one nickel for military aid". Thieu resigned on April 21, 1975, publicly blaming the lack of support from the United States for the fall of his country. Two days later, on April 23, Ford gave a speech at Tulane University, announcing that the Vietnam War was over "...as far as America is concerned".

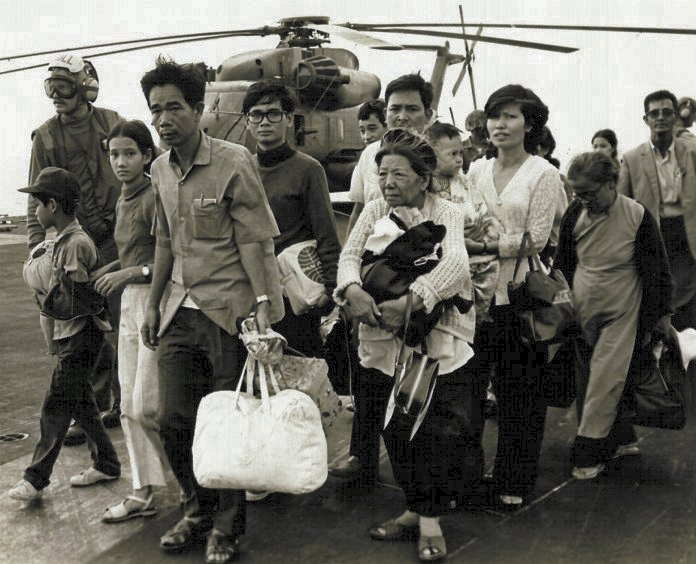
South Vietnamese refugees arrive on a U.S. Navy vessel during Operation Frequent Wind

With the North Vietnamese forces advancing on the South Vietnamese capital of Saigon, Ford ordered the evacuation of U.S. personnel, while also allowing U.S. forces to aid others who wished to escape from the Communist advance. Forty thousand U.S. citizens and South Vietnamese were evacuated by plane until enemy attacks made further such evacuations impossible. In Operation Frequent Wind, the final phase of the evacuation preceding the fall of Saigon on April 30, military and Air America helicopters took evacuees to off-shore U.S. Navy vessels. During the operation, so many South Vietnamese helicopters landed on the vessels taking the evacuees that some were pushed overboard to make room for more people.

The Vietnam War, which had raged since the 1950s, finally came to an end with the Fall of Saigon, and Vietnam was unified into one communist country. Many of the Vietnamese evacuees were allowed to enter the United States under the Indochina Migration and Refugee Assistance Act. The 1975 act appropriated $455 million toward the costs of assisting the settlement of Indochinese refugees. In all, 130,000 Vietnamese refugees came to the United States in 1975. Thousands more escaped in the years that followed. Following the end of the war, Ford expanded the embargo of North Vietnam to cover all of Vietnam, blocked Vietnam's accession to the United Nations, and refused to establish full diplomatic relations.

=== Mayaguez and Panmunjom ===
North Vietnam's victory over the South led to a considerable shift in the political winds in Asia, and Ford administration officials worried about a consequent loss of U.S. influence in the region. The administration proved it was willing to respond forcefully to challenges to its interests in the region when Khmer Rouge forces seized an American ship in international waters.

In May 1975, shortly after the fall of Saigon and the Khmer Rouge conquest of Cambodia, Cambodians seized the American merchant ship Mayaguez in international waters, sparking the Mayaguez incident. Ford dispatched Marines to rescue the crew from an island where the crew was believed to be held, but the Marines met unexpectedly stiff resistance just as, unknown to the U.S., the crew were being released. In the assault, 15 U.S. servicemen were killed, 3 went missing and 50 were wounded, and another 23 died when a helicopter carrying a security police squadron crashed in Thailand. Despite American losses, the rescue operation proved to be a boon to Ford's poll numbers; Senator Barry Goldwater declared that the operation "shows we've still got balls in this country." Some historians have argued that the Ford administration felt the need to respond forcefully to the incident because it was construed as a Soviet plot. But work by Andrew Gawthorpe, published in 2009, based on an analysis of the administration's internal discussions, shows that Ford's national security team understood that the seizure of the vessel was a local, and perhaps even accidental, provocation by an immature Khmer government. Nevertheless, they felt the need to respond forcefully to discourage further provocations by other Communist countries in Asia.

=== Middle East ===
In the Middle East and eastern Mediterranean, two ongoing international disputes developed into crises during Ford's presidency. The Cyprus dispute turned into a crisis with the 1974 Turkish invasion of Cyprus, which took place following the Greek-backed 1974 Cypriot coup d'état. The dispute put the United States in a difficult position as both Greece and Turkey were members of NATO. In mid-August, the Greek government withdrew Greece from the NATO military structure; in mid-September 1974, the Senate and House of Representatives overwhelmingly voted to halt military aid to Turkey. Ford vetoed the bill due to concerns regarding its effect on Turkish-American relations and the deterioration of security on NATO's eastern front. A second bill was then passed by Congress, which Ford also vetoed, although a compromise was accepted to continue aid until the end of the year. As Ford expected, Turkish relations were considerably disrupted until 1978.

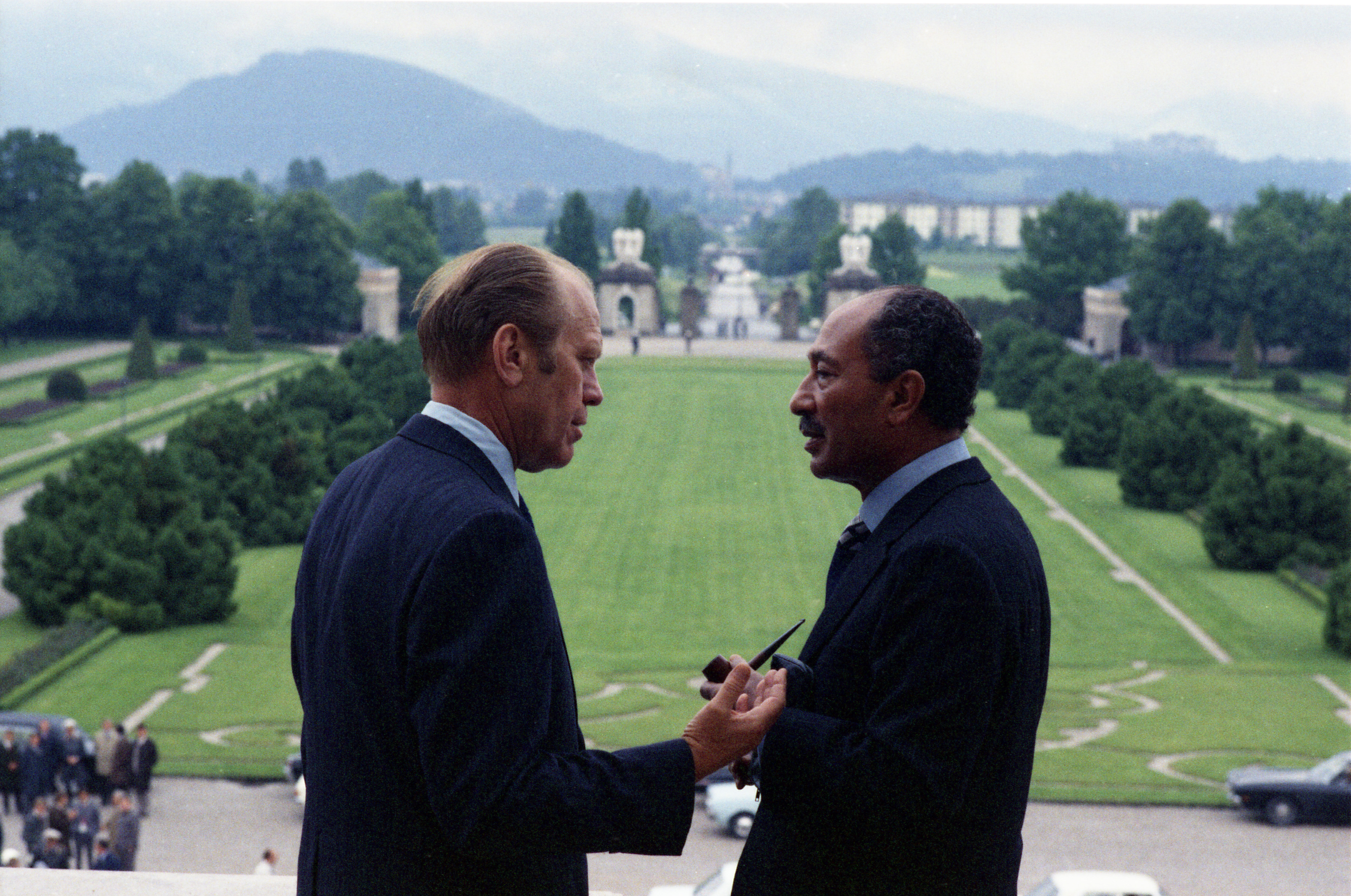
Ford with Anwar Sadat in Salzburg, 1975

In 1973, Egypt and Syria had launched a joint surprise attack against Israel, seeking to re-take land lost in the Six-Day War of 1967. However, early Arab success gave way to an Israel military victory in what became known as the Yom Kippur War. Although an initial cease fire had been implemented to end active conflict in the Yom Kippur War, Kissinger's continuing shuttle diplomacy was showing little progress. Ford disliked what he saw as Israeli "stalling" on a peace agreement, and wrote, "[Israeli] tactics frustrated the Egyptians and made me mad as hell." During Kissinger's shuttle to Israel in early March 1975, a last minute reversal to consider further withdrawal, prompted a cable from Ford to Prime Minister Yitzhak Rabin, which included:

I wish to express my profound disappointment over Israel's attitude in the course of the negotiations ... Failure of the negotiation will have a far reaching impact on the region and on our relations. I have given instructions for a reassessment of United States policy in the region, including our relations with Israel, with the aim of ensuring that overall American interests ... are protected. You will be notified of our decision.

On March 24, Ford informed congressional leaders of both parties of the reassessment of the administration policies in the Middle East. "Reassessment", in practical terms, meant canceling or suspending further aid to Israel. For six months between March and September 1975, the United States refused to conclude any new arms agreements with Israel. Rabin notes it was "an innocent-sounding term that heralded one of the worst periods in American-Israeli relations". The announced reassessments upset many American supporters of Israel. On May 21, Ford "experienced a real shock" when seventy-six U.S. senators wrote him a letter urging him to be "responsive" to Israel's request for $2.59 billion in military and economic aid. Ford felt truly annoyed and thought the chance for peace was jeopardized. It was, since the September 1974 ban on arms to Turkey, the second major congressional intrusion upon the President's foreign policy prerogatives. The following summer months were described by Ford as an American-Israeli "war of nerves" or "test of wills". After much bargaining, the Sinai Interim Agreement (Sinai II) between Egypt and Israel was formally signed, and aid resumed.

=== Angola ===
A civil war broke out in Angola after the fledgling African nation gained independence from Portugal in 1975. The Soviet Union and Cuba both became heavily involved in the conflict, backing the left-wing MPLA, one of the major factions in the civil war. In response, the CIA directed aid to two other factions in the war, UNITA and the FNLA. After members of Congress learned of the CIA operation, Congress voted to cut off aid to the Angolan groups. The Angolan Civil War would continue in subsequent years, but the Soviet role in the war hindered détente. Congress's role in ending the CIA presence marked the growing power of the legislative branch in foreign affairs.

==== South Africa ====
During the Ford administration, the United States began to distance itself from the apartheid regime of South Africa's nuclear weapons program. By this point, however, the program was highly advanced, and this policy shift was, by this point, too late in time to significantly stall the apartheid regime's ultimate goal of developing a nuclear deterrent.

=== Indonesia and East Timor ===
U.S. policy since the 1940s has been to support Indonesia, which hosted American investments in petroleum and raw materials and controlled a highly strategic location near vital shipping lanes. In 1975, the left-wing Fretilin party seized power after a civil war in East Timor (now Timor-Leste), a former colony of Portugal that shared the island of Timor with the Indonesian region of West Timor. Indonesian leaders feared that East Timor would serve as a hostile left-wing base that would promote secessionist movements inside Indonesia. Anti-Fretilin activists from the other main parties fled to West Timor and called upon Indonesia to annex East Timor and end the communist threat. On December 6, 1975, Ford and Kissinger met Indonesian President Suharto in Jakarta. Suharto discussed the plans to invade East Timor; both Ford and Kissinger indicated the United States would not oppose the invasion. Indonesia invaded the next day, and annexed the country. A bloody civil war broke out, and over one hundred thousand died in the fighting or from executions or starvation. Upwards of half of the population of East Timor became refugees fleeing Fretilin-controlled areas between 1975 and 1981. Later, after international intervention in the 1999 East Timorese crisis, East Timor became an independent nation in 2002.

=== List of international trips ===
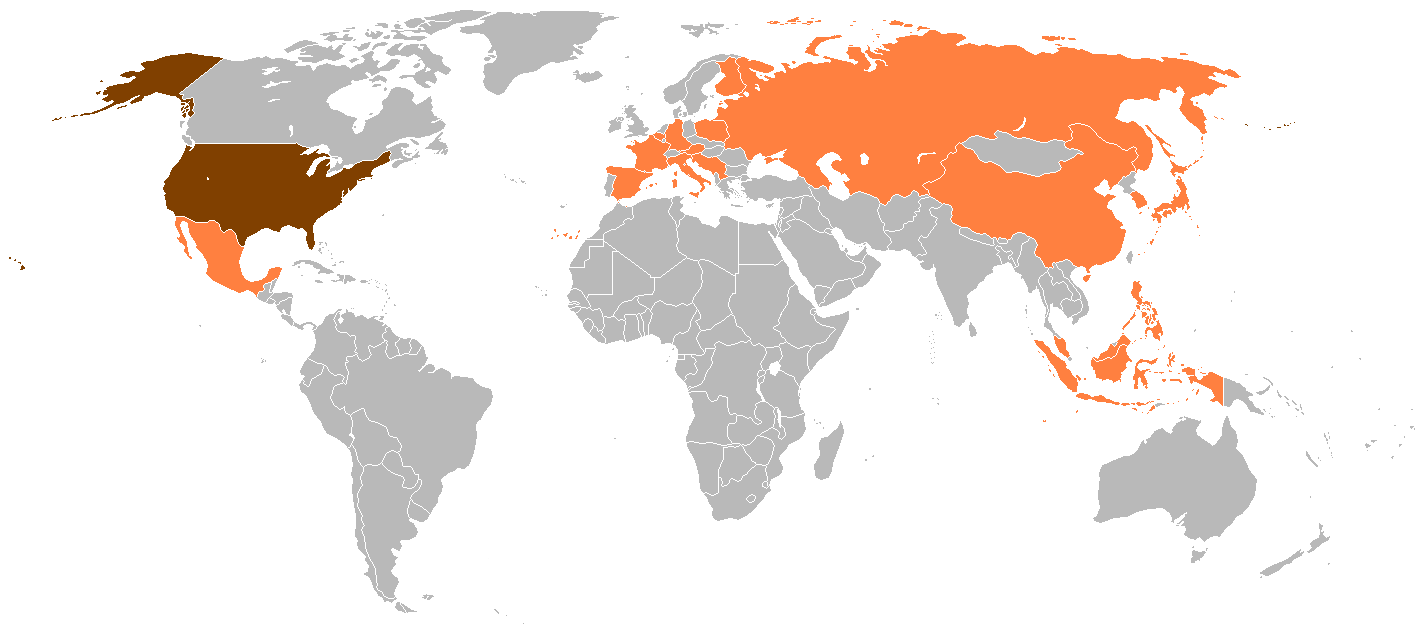
Ford made seven international trips to eighteen different countries during his presidency.

	Dates	Country	Locations	Details
1	October 21, 1974	Mexico	Nogales, Magdalena de Kino	Met with President Luis Echeverría and laid a wreath at the tomb of Padre Eusebio Kino.
2	November 18–22, 1974	Japan	Tokyo, Kyoto	State visit. Met with Prime Minister Kakuei Tanaka.
2	November 22–23, 1974	South Korea	Seoul	Met with President Park Chung Hee.
2	November 23–24, 1974	Soviet Union	Vladivostok	Met with General Secretary Leonid Brezhnev and discussed limitations of strategic arms.
3	December 14–16, 1974	France	Fort-de-France, Martinique	Met with President Valéry Giscard d'Estaing.
4	May 28–31, 1975	Belgium	Brussels	Attended the NATO Summit Meeting. Addressed the North Atlantic Council and met separately with NATO heads of state and government.
4	May 31 – June 1, 1975	Spain	Madrid	Met with Generalissimo Francisco Franco. Received keys to city from Mayor of Madrid.
4	June 1–3, 1975	Austria	Salzburg	Met with Chancellor Bruno Kreisky and Egyptian President Anwar Sadat.
4	June 3, 1975	Italy	Rome	Met with President Giovanni Leone and Prime Minister Aldo Moro.
4	June 3, 1975	Vatican City	Apostolic Palace	Audience with Pope Paul VI.
5	July 26–28, 1975	West Germany	Bonn, Linz am Rhein	Met with President Walter Scheel and Chancellor Helmut Schmidt.
5	July 28–29, 1975	Poland	Warsaw, Kraków	Official visit. Met with First Secretary Edward Gierek.
5	July 29 – August 2, 1975	Finland	Helsinki	Attended opening session of the Conference on Security and Cooperation in Europe. Met with the heads of state and government of Finland, Great Britain, Turkey, West Germany, France, Italy and Spain. Also met with Soviet General Secretary Brezhnev. Signed the final act of the conference.
5	August 2–3, 1975	Romania	Bucharest, Sinaia	Official visit. Met with President Nicolae Ceaușescu.
5	August 3–4, 1975	Yugoslavia	Belgrade	Official visit. Met with President Josip Broz Tito and Prime Minister Džemal Bijedić.
6	November 15–17, 1975	France	Rambouillet	Attended the 1st G6 summit.
7	December 1–5, 1975	China	Peking	Official visit. Met with Party Chairman Mao Zedong and Vice Premier Deng Xiaoping.
7	December 5–6, 1975	Indonesia	Jakarta	Official visit. Met with President Suharto.
7	December 6–7, 1975	Philippines	Manila	Official visit. Met with President Ferdinand Marcos.

== Assassination attempts ==
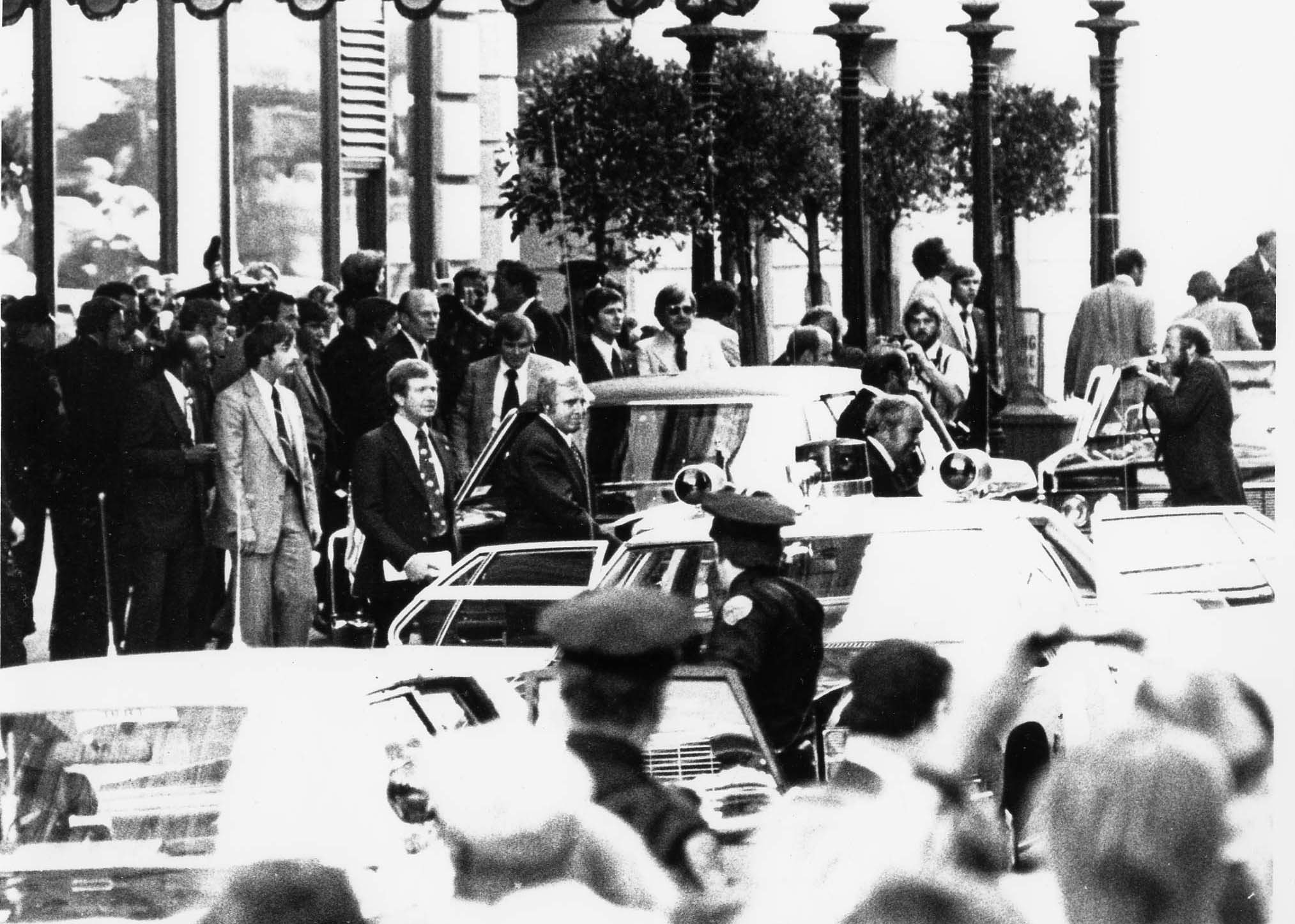
Ford exits the St. Francis Hotel in San Francisco seconds before Moore attempted to shoot him.

Ford faced two assassination attempts during his presidency. In Sacramento, California, on September 5, 1975, Lynette "Squeaky" Fromme, a follower of Charles Manson, pointed a .45-caliber pistol at Ford. As Fromme pulled the trigger, Larry Buendorf, a Secret Service agent, grabbed the gun, and Fromme was taken into custody. She was later convicted of attempted assassination of the President and was sentenced to life in prison; she was released on parole on August 14, 2009.

In reaction to this attempt, the Secret Service began keeping Ford at a more secure distance from anonymous crowds, a strategy that may have saved his life seventeen days later. As he left the St. Francis Hotel in downtown San Francisco, Sara Jane Moore, standing in a crowd of onlookers across the street, pointed her .38-caliber revolver at him. Moore fired a single round but missed because the sights were off. Just before she fired a second round, retired Marine Oliver Sipple grabbed at the gun and deflected her shot; the bullet missed Ford, then ricocheted and hit a taxi driver, who was slightly wounded. Moore was later sentenced to life in prison. She was paroled on December 31, 2007, after serving 32 years.

== 1976 presidential election ==
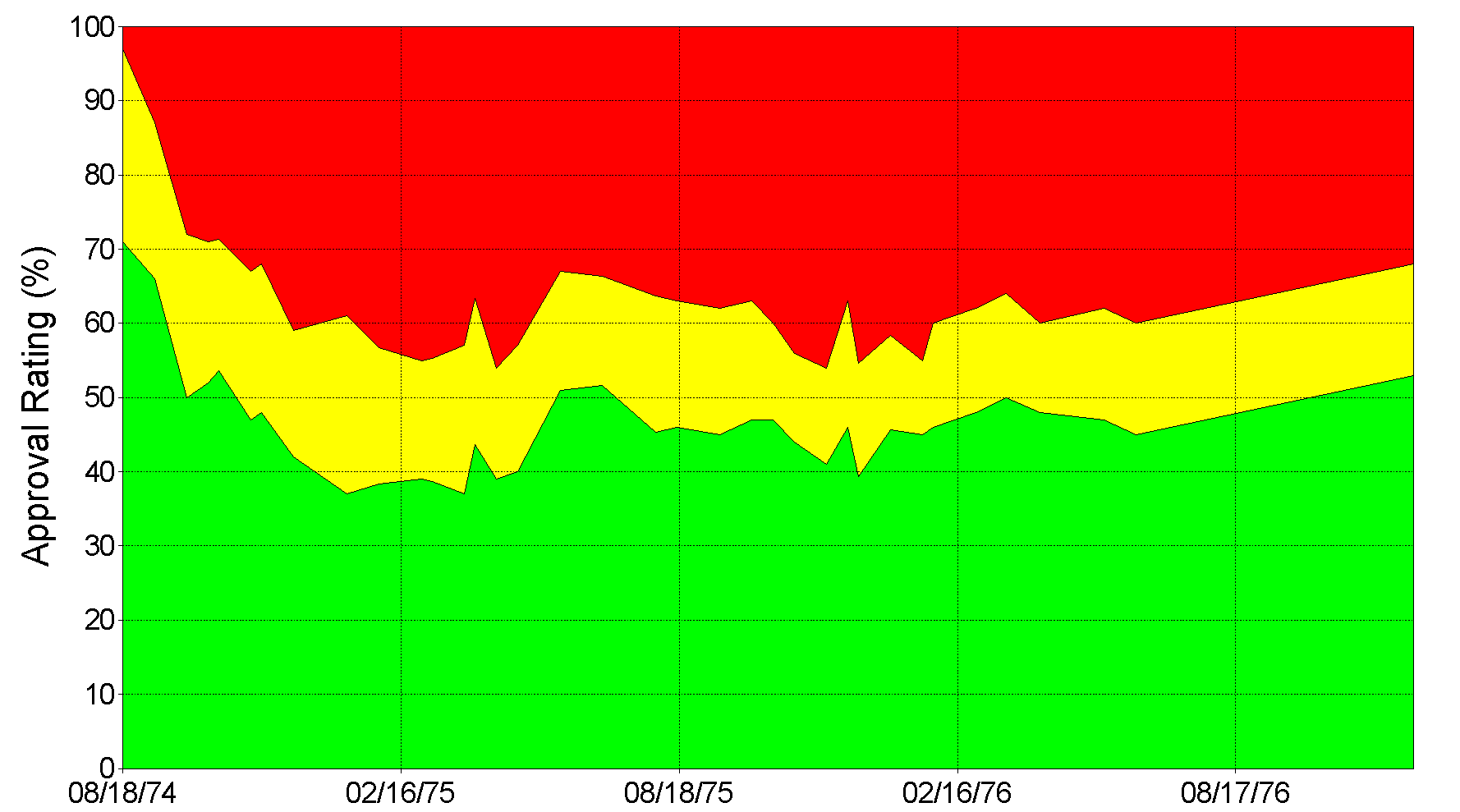
Graph of Ford's approval ratings in Gallup polls

Democrat Jimmy Carter defeated President Ford in the 1976 presidential election

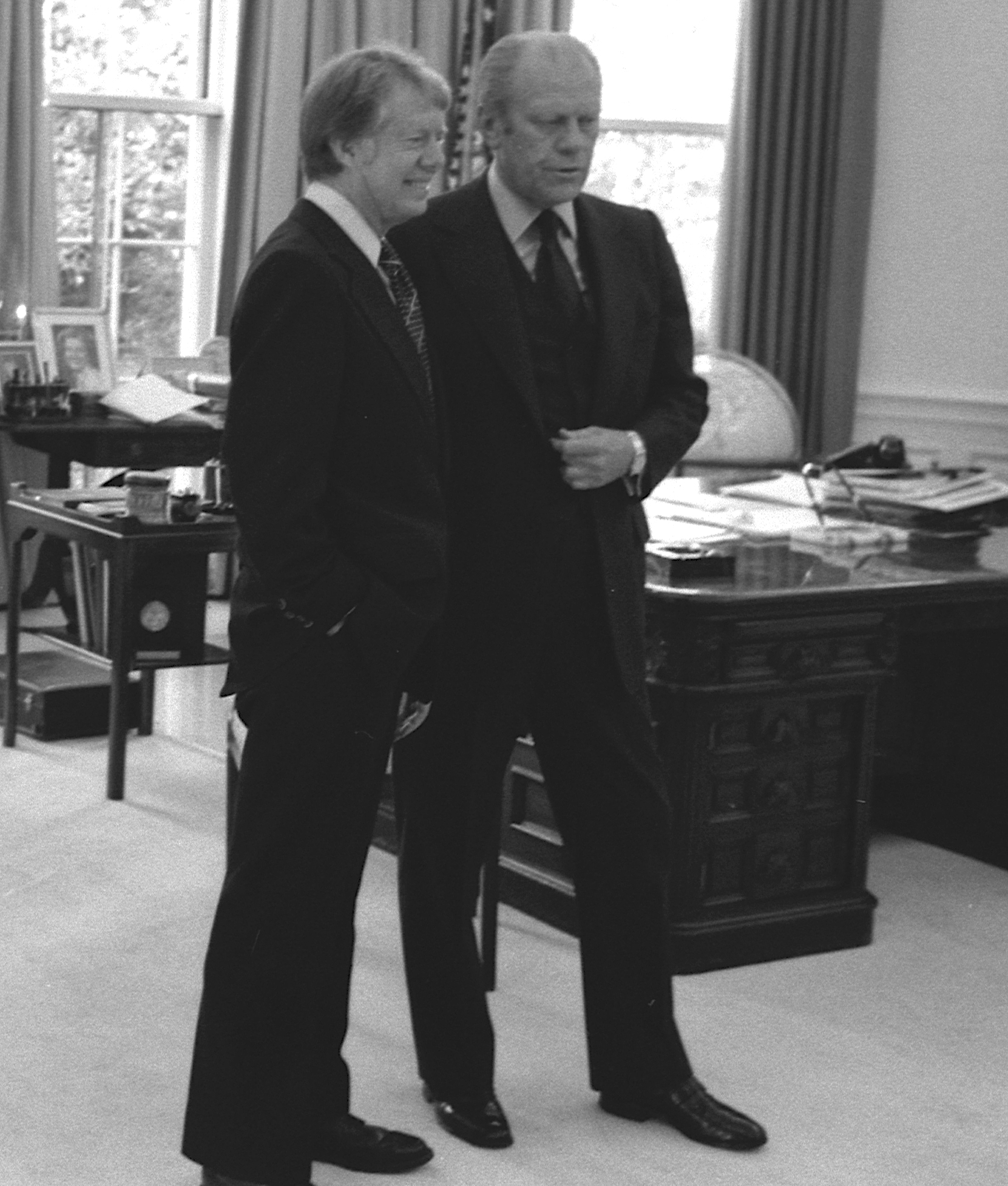
President Gerald Ford and President-elect Jimmy Carter in the Oval Office on November 22, 1976

Ford made the first major decision of his campaign in mid-1975, when he selected Bo Callaway to run his campaign. The pardon of Nixon and the disastrous 1974 mid-term elections weakened Ford's standing within the party, creating an opening for a competitive Republican primary. The intra-party challenge to Ford came from the conservative wing of the party; many conservative leaders had viewed Ford as insufficiently conservative throughout his political career. Conservative Republicans were further disappointed with the selection of Rockefeller as vice president, and faulted Ford for the fall of Saigon, the amnesty for draft dodgers, and the continuation of détente policies. Ronald Reagan, a leader among the conservatives, launched his campaign in autumn of 1975. Hoping to appease his party's right wing and sap Reagan's momentum, Ford requested that Rockefeller not seek election and the vice president agreed to this request. Ford defeated Reagan in the first several primaries, but Reagan gained momentum after winning North Carolina's March 1976 primary. Entering the 1976 Republican National Convention, neither Ford nor Reagan had won a majority of delegates through the primaries, but Ford was able to win the support of enough unpledged delegates to win the presidential nomination. Senator Bob Dole of Kansas won the vice presidential nomination.

In the aftermath of the Vietnam War and Watergate, Ford campaigned at a time of cynicism and disillusionment with government. Ford adopted a "Rose Garden strategy", with Ford mostly staying in Washington in an attempt to appear presidential. The campaign benefited from several anniversary events held during the period leading up to the United States Bicentennial. On the Fourth of July, the president watched the national fireworks display in Washington. The 200th anniversary of the Battles of Lexington and Concord in Massachusetts gave Ford the opportunity to deliver a speech to 110,000 in Concord acknowledging the need for a strong national defense tempered with a plea for "reconciliation, not recrimination" and "reconstruction, not rancor" between the United States and those who would pose "threats to peace". Speaking in New Hampshire on the previous day, Ford condemned the growing trend toward big government bureaucracy and argued for a return to "basic American virtues".

Eleven major contenders competed in the 1976 Democratic primaries. At the start of the primaries, former Governor Jimmy Carter of Georgia was little-known nationally, but he rocketed to prominence with a victory in the Iowa caucus and the New Hampshire primary. A born again Christian, Carter emphasized his personal morality and his status as a Washington outsider. Carter won the presidential nomination on the first ballot of the 1976 Democratic National Convention, and selected liberal Senator Walter Mondale of Minnesota as his running mate. Carter began the race with a huge lead in the polls, but committed a major gaffe by giving an interview to Playboy in which he stated that "I've committed adultery in my heart several times." Ford made his own gaffe during a televised debate, stating that "there is no Soviet domination of Eastern Europe." In an interview years later, Ford said he had intended to imply that the Soviets would never crush the spirits of eastern Europeans seeking independence. However, the phrasing was so awkward that questioner Max Frankel was visibly incredulous at the response. As a result of this blunder, Ford's surge stalled and Carter was able to maintain a slight lead in the polls.

In the end, Carter won the election, receiving 50.1% of the popular vote and 297 electoral votes compared with 48.0% of the popular vote and 240 electoral votes for Ford. Ford dominated in the West and performed well in New England, but Carter carried much of the South and won Ohio, Pennsylvania, and New York. Though Ford lost, in the three months between the Republican National Convention and the election he had managed to close what polls had shown as a 33-point Carter lead to a 2-point margin.

== Elections during the Ford presidency ==
Congressional party leaders
		Senate leaders		House leaders	
Congress	Year	Majority	Minority	Speaker	Minority
93rd	1973.01.03.–1975.01.03.	Mansfield	Scott	Albert	Rhodes
94th	1975.01.03.–1977.01.03.	Mansfield	Scott	Albert	Rhodes
95th	1977.01.03.–1979.01.03.	Byrd	Baker	O'Neill	Rhodes

Republican seats in Congress
Congress	Senate	House
93rd	42	192
94th	37	144
95th	38	143

== Historical reputation ==
1975 Assay Commission Medal-Julian AC-119, R-7 Bronze

Polls of historians and political scientists have generally ranked Ford as a below-average president. A 2018 poll of the American Political Science Association's Presidents and Executive Politics section ranked Ford as the 25th best president. A 2017 C-SPAN poll of historians also ranked Ford as the 25th best president. Historian John Robert Greene writes that "Ford had difficulty navigating a demanding political environment." He also notes, however, that "Americans, by and large, believed that Gerald Ford was an innately decent and good man and that he would (and did) bring honor to the White House. Although this sentiment proved too little to bring Ford to victory in 1976, it is an assessment that most Americans and scholars still find valid in the years after his presidency."

== See also ==
- Bibliography of Gerald Ford
- Timeline of the Gerald Ford presidency
