= William M. Roth =

American shipping executive and special ambassador for trade

William Roth
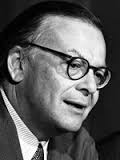
- Portrait of William Roth

2nd United States Trade Representative
- In office March 24, 1967 – January 20, 1969
- President: Lyndon B. Johnson
- Preceded by: Christian Herter
- Succeeded by: Carl J. Gilbert

Personal details
- Born: William Matson Roth; September 3, 1916 San Francisco, California, U.S.
- Died: May 29, 2014 (aged 97) Petaluma, California, U.S.
- Party: Democratic
- Spouse: Joan Osborn
- Children: 3

William Matson Roth (September 3, 1916 – May 29, 2014) was an American shipping executive, special ambassador for trade, member of the ACLU executive committee, and Regent for the University of California. He is credited with the preservation of Ghirardelli Square in San Francisco.

== Early life and family ==
He was born in San Francisco, California, the son of Lurline Matson Roth and William Philip Roth. His maternal grandfather was William Matson, the founder of the Matson Navigation Company. Roth attended and graduated from Yale University in 1939.

Roth married Joan Osborn in 1946, and together they had three daughters (Anna, Margaret, and Jessica). Osborn was the daughter of conservationist Henry Fairfield Osborn Jr. Roth died on May 29, 2014, in Petaluma, California.

One daughter, Maggie Roth, wife of artist David Best, lives on what is now known as the Fairfield Osborn Preserve; it was purchased by the Roth family in the 1950s and subsequently donated to the Nature Conservancy. Maggie and David have two children together. David has two children from a previous marriage.

== Career ==
In 1962, Roth and his mother purchased Ghirardelli Square in fear that it would be torn down and replaced with condominiums. They hired a landscape architectural firm to convert the factory with its historic brick structure into a retail complex. It was considered to be the first major adaptive re-use project in the United States. Ghirardelli Square was later listed on the National Register of Historical Places to preserve it for future generations.

In 1966, he was targeted along with Clark Kerr and Elinor Raas Heller by a fellow Regent, Edwin Pauley, for his alleged "ultra-liberal" views. Ronald Reagan made the Free Speech Movement and Opposition to the Vietnam War on the Berkeley campus one of his major campaign issues.

At the first Regents' meeting after Reagan's election, Kerr was fired, with all the governor's new appointees voting for termination. Roth remained a member of the Regents' Board for many years and was deliberately late for Reagan's last meeting in 1974, to avoid voting on a resolution of approval for the outgoing governor.

President Lyndon B. Johnson appointed him to be the Trade Representative, following the death of Christian A. Herter the previous year.

Among other activities, Roth worked as a special representative for trade on US-European trade talks (named the Kennedy Round negotiations). See the photo of Roth at a 1967 U.S. Chamber of Commerce conference alongside US Secretary of Commerce Alexander B. Trowbridge; Secretary of Agriculture Orville Freeman, and Under Secretary of Labor James J. Reynolds.

In 1974, Roth, a long-time contributor to the Democratic Party, ran for Governor of California in the Democratic Primary election. He placed fourth (receiving 10% of the vote) in a crowded field of candidates that included San Francisco Mayor Joseph Alioto, Speaker of the Assembly Bob Moretti, Congressman Jerome Waldie, and the winner, Secretary of State Jerry Brown, who had the advantage of name recognition, his father Pat Brown having been Governor eight years before.

Roth had a summer home on Sonoma Mountain with a substantial area, having purchased the holding around 1950; the Roth family gave this property to the Nature Conservancy, who transformed it into a nature preserve, presently known as the Fairfield Osborn Preserve.

Political offices
Preceded by Christian Herter	United States Trade Representative; 1967–1969	Succeeded by Carl Gilbert
