= Edwin W. Pauley =

American businessman and political leader (1903–1981)

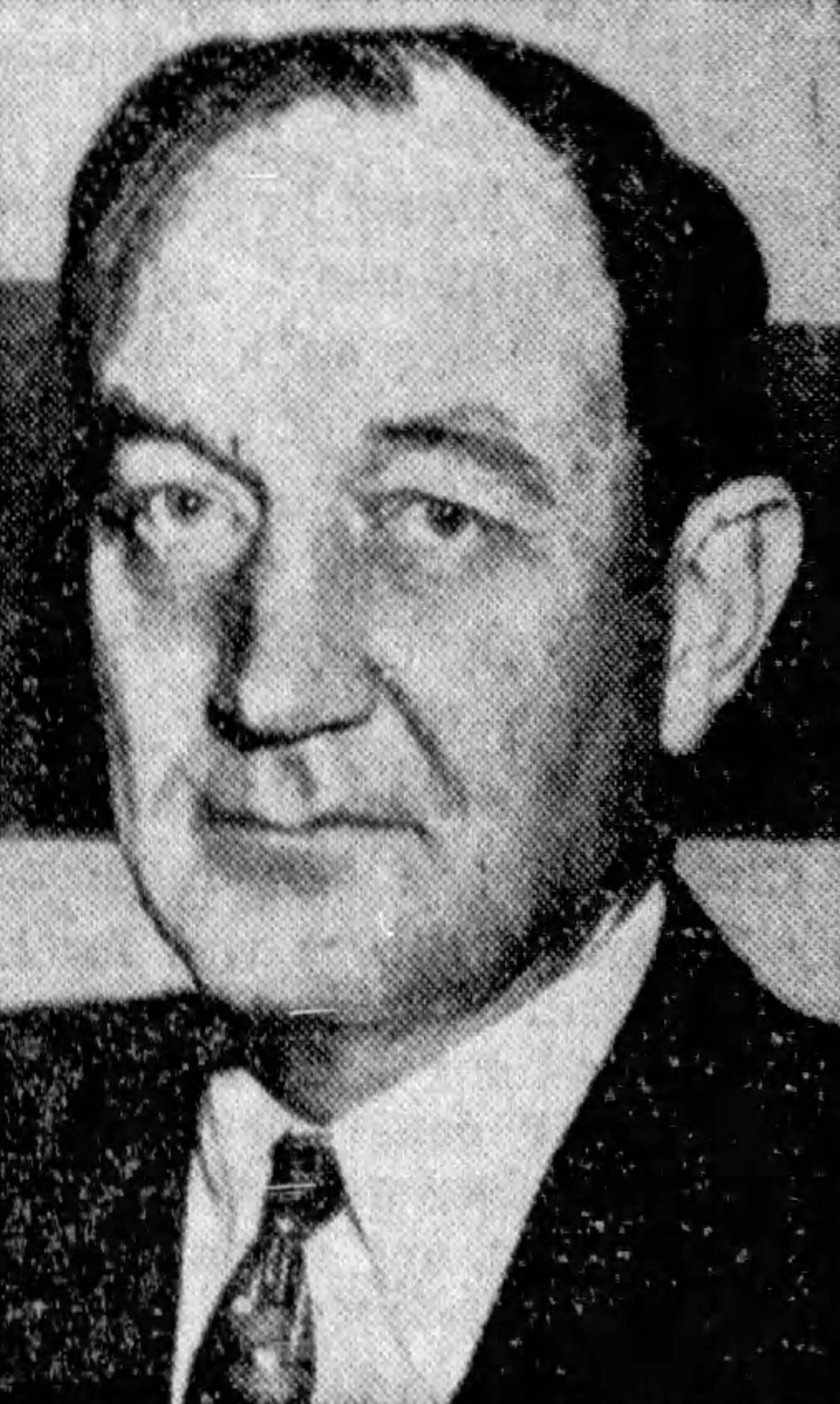
- Pauley c. 1947

Treasurer of the Democratic National Committee
- In office October 1942 – April 28, 1945
- Preceded by: R. J. Reynolds Jr.
- Succeeded by: George Killion

Personal details
- Born: January 7, 1903 Indianapolis, Indiana, U.S.
- Died: July 28, 1981 (aged 78)
- Party: Democratic
- Education: University of California, Berkeley

Edwin Wendell Pauley Sr. (January 7, 1903 – July 28, 1981) was an American businessman and political leader who served as treasurer of the Democratic National Committee from 1942 to 1945.

== Early life ==
Born in Indianapolis, Indiana, to Elbert L. Pauley and the former Ellen Van Petten, he attended Occidental College, in northeast Los Angeles, during 1919 and 1920 before transferring to the University of California, Berkeley, where he was a member of Phi Kappa Psi fraternity, earning a Bachelor of Science in 1922 and a Master of Science the following year.

== Business career ==
Pauley made his fortune running oil companies from the mid-1920s onward. He founded the Petrol Corp. in 1923. Pauley was president of Fortuna Petroleum by 1933. In 1947 he bought Coconut Island in Hawaii, as a private retreat. Several of his deals involved Zapata Corporation, run by George H. W. Bush, including a joint-venture with Pemargo in 1960. In 1958 he founded Pauley Petroleum which, with Howard Hughes, expanded oil production in the Gulf of Mexico.

Later Pauley also became a founding part-owner of television station KTVU in Oakland, a part-owner of the Los Angeles Rams football team and a director of Western Airlines.

== Politics ==
Pauley became involved with the Democratic Party as a fundraiser in 1930s, eventually becoming treasurer of the Democratic National Committee. In 1940, he served as a member of the Interstate Oil and Compact Commission. He was a friend and confidante of U.S. Senator Harry S. Truman, and through Truman's influence, President Franklin D. Roosevelt appointed Pauley as petroleum coordinator of Lend-Lease supplies for the Soviet Union and the United Kingdom in 1941. He was Treasurer of the 1944 Democratic National Convention.

As president, Truman appointed him United States representative to the Allied Reparations Committee from 1945 to 1947. With the rank of ambassador, as well as industrial and commercial advisor to the Potsdam Conference, his chief task was to renegotiate the reparations agreements formulated at the Yalta Conference (many of which affected eventual C.I.A. director Allen Dulles's former clients). When Truman tried to appoint him Under Secretary of the Navy in 1946, Secretary of the Interior Harold L. Ickes resigned in protest, claiming that while Pauley was treasurer of the Democratic National Committee, he had suggested to Ickes that $300,000 ($5.49 million in 2025 dollars) in campaign funds could be raised if the Interior Department would drop its fight against the State of California for ownership of oil-rich offshore lands. Ickes's resignation scuttled the appointment, and Pauley worked behind the scenes thereafter.

By successive appointments from several California governors, Pauley served as a University of California Regent from 1940 to 1972. As a regent, he was staunchly opposed to the creation of the University of California, San Diego.

== Informant during anti-war protests ==
By the 1960s, Pauley came to support Ronald Reagan, and was by far the Board of Regents' harshest critic of UC Berkeley student protesters.

In 1965, Pauley was serving as a regent at the University of California, when anti-Vietnam war campus protests began to grow. At Pauley's request, CIA Director John McCone met with FBI Director J. Edgar Hoover on January 28 and Hoover agreed to leak to Pauley information about UC System President Clark Kerr. (See memo regarding McCone's request to meet with Hoover. McCone graduated from UC Berkeley in 1922, the year before Pauley.) At that meeting, McCone told Hoover that Pauley was very upset about the "situation at Berkeley", and was "anxious to get a line on any persons who are communists or have communist associations, either on the faculty or in the student body." As soon as McCone left his office, Hoover phoned Los Angeles FBI chief Wesley Grapp, and ordered him to give Pauley anonymous memos on regents, faculty members, and students who were "causing trouble at Berkeley". Hoover admonished Grapp, "It must be impressed upon Mr. Pauley that this data is being furnished in strict confidence."

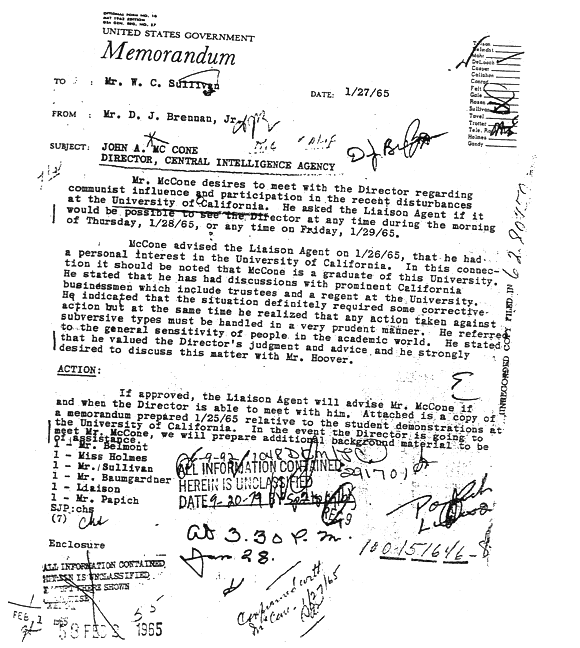
1965 memo regarding J. Edgar Hoover meeting CIA Director John McCone, re: UC Berkeley protests.

Five days later (February 2) Grapp met with Pauley for two hours at his office in the Pauley Petroleum Building in Los Angeles. Grapp provided him information from FBI files on other regents, faculty, and students who were considered "ultra-liberal". The CIA and FBI worked in conjunction with Ronald Reagan, who sought to mount a "psychological warfare campaign" against the budding Free Speech Movement and anti-war sit-ins, including using tax-evasion and "any other available" charges in which the FBI agreed to assist. "This has been done in the past, and has worked quite successfully", Hoover noted.

(This information was not made public until 2002, after a fifteen-year legal battle with the FBI that went all the way to the US Supreme Court, as a result of a FOIA request for an in-depth San Francisco Chronicle investigation. The FBI had claimed it needed to maintain secrecy to "protect law enforcement operations". The National Security Act of 1947 bars the CIA from engaging in domestic intelligence activities.)

Pauley began the February 2, 1965, meeting with Grapp by saying he was upset about the Free Speech Movement and recalled that "obnoxious question ... concerning the FBI being a secret police" (referring to a 1959 entry exam question.) He told Grapp he had "no use for [UC President] Kerr" and had accused Kerr of being a "communist or a communist follower". Pauley explained that the 24-member Board of Regents was divided and that his faction wanted "strong positive action taken immediately to clean up the mess." The problem, he said, was that so far he'd been unable to muster the votes to fire Kerr. He blamed the impasse on three "ultra-liberal" regents who staunchly backed Kerr. Governor Pat Brown (D) had named to the board: William Coblentz (Brown's former special counsel); William M. Roth (member of the ACLU executive committee); and Elinor Raas Heller (member of the Democratic National Committee).

Pauley told Grapp that in the 1950s the FBI secretly gave the university reports on professors it was considering hiring. He said he wanted to restore the procedure—which the FBI had code-named the Responsibilities Program—and offered to pay someone to check FBI files. After Pauley promised not to reveal that the FBI was his source, Grapp gave him a report on UC Berkeley immunology professor Leon Wofsy that summarized news stories from 1945 to 1956, noting that Wofsy had been a self-avowed Communist Party official who tried to get young people involved with the party. The report failed to note that since 1957 the FBI had found no evidence that Wofsy had been involved with the party.

On February 4, 1965, Grapp told Hoover that Pauley could be used as a source on internal University affairs, and could harass and remove suspected communists on the faculty and the Board of Regents. Hoover approved, and one week later Pauley was given confidential information on Coblentz, Roth and Heller. Pauley, Grapp reported to Hoover, was "most appreciative" of the information on his opponents. As Pauley saw it, according to Grapp's report, UC would remain in turmoil "as long as the current officials were in power at the university."

That fall, thousands of students joined the escalating protests. To Pauley and the FBI, it was further proof that Kerr had lost control of the university. Pauley confided to Grapp that two alumni were taking things into their own hands. They had recruited athletes to "beat up the demonstrators" and hired a barber to "forcibly 'shear' the students who need it". Grapp continued to slip Pauley anonymous memos about students and faculty—at least two dozen more—that he could use in persuading the regents to fire Kerr. But in October, a frustrated Pauley told Grapp he was still "two votes short to fire Clark Kerr". Kerr would remain in charge of the university, it seemed, as long as Brown remained governor.

When Ronald Reagan was elected California's governor in 1966, after campaigning against "campus malcontents and filthy speech advocates" at Berkeley, one of his first moves was to fire Kerr. Reagan's Legal Affairs Secretary, Herbert Ellingwood, met with FBI agent Cartha "Deke" DeLoach at FBI Headquarters, and noted that Reagan was "dedicated to the destruction of disruptive elements on college campuses."

== Philanthropy ==
After his retirement from the University of California system, Pauley concentrated on his many philanthropic interests and business concerns. He was particularly interested in promoting the use of his Coconut Island in Kāne'ohe Bay, Oahu, Hawaii by the University of Hawaii at Manoa and its Hawaiʻi Institute of Marine Biology. He kept about half of the island for the use of his family—his wife Bobbi, his son, Stephen M. Pauley and daughter, Susie Pauley and eventually their families. After Pauley's death in 1981, his widow Bobbi Pauley established the Edwin W. Pauley Foundation to continue their philanthropic work. In 1995, the Pauley family presented the University of Hawai`i with a gift of the private portion of the c. 24-acre (97,000 m^{2}) island to the University, and provided funds for the building of a new library and laboratory buildings for the institute. Built on a living coral reef, the institute is now one of the world's premier locations for the study of marine biology.

== Honors ==
The Pauley Pavilion at the University of California, Los Angeles, is named in the honor of his philanthropy and service as a regent. Pauley donated almost one-fifth of the five million dollars needed to construct the Pauley Pavilion, which since 1965 has served as home stadium for the basketball and volleyball teams of UCLA.

A smaller dedication to Pauley exists at his alma mater, the University of California, Berkeley: the Pauley Ballroom, which can seat up to 1,000 people in the Martin Luther King Jr. Student Union.
