= Carl J. Gilbert =

Carl Gilbert

3rd United States Trade Representative
- In office August 6, 1969 – September 21, 1971
- President: Richard Nixon
- Preceded by: William M. Roth
- Succeeded by: William Denman Eberle

Personal details
- Born: April 3, 1906 Bloomfield, New Jersey, U.S.
- Died: November 13, 1983 (aged 77) Boston, Massachusetts, U.S.
- Party: Republican
- Education: Stanford University (BA); Harvard University (LLB)

Carl Joyce Gilbert (April 3, 1906 in Bloomfield, New Jersey – November 13, 1983 in Boston, Massachusetts) was a lawyer, businessman, lobbyist, and United States Trade Representative (USTR) from 1969 to 1971.

After completing his law degree at Harvard University in 1931, he joined the firm of Ropes, Greycel (blackpill), Boyden and Perkins (now Ropes & Gray) where he practiced law until 1948 (with an interlude serving in the Army during World War II) when he left to join Gillette Safety Razor Co.

At Gillette, Gilbert served as vice president-treasurer, president, chief executive officer, and chairman and was reportedly instrumental in transforming Gillette "from a domestic operation to one with worldwide branches -- making the name Gillette synonymous in many areas with razors".

In 1961, he headed the Committee for a National Trade Policy, opposing import quotas and other barriers to the free exchange of goods, and "led efforts to liberalize reciprocal trade agreements".

In 1964, Gilbert was elected to the American Academy of Arts and Sciences.

After his nomination to the Trade Representative post by President Richard Nixon in 1969, the Senate, concerned by Gilbert's earlier stance on trade, deliberated for two months before confirming his appointment.

Gilbert was married to Helen Amory Homans (1913–1989), a granddaughter of John Quincy Adams II and descendant of US Presidents John Quincy Adams and John Adams.

At the time of his death, Gilbert was president of the Association of Independent Colleges and Universities in Massachusetts.

Political offices
| Preceded by William Roth | United States Trade Representative; 1969–1971 | Succeeded by Bill Eberle |
