= Winder Building =

- U.S. National Register of Historic Places
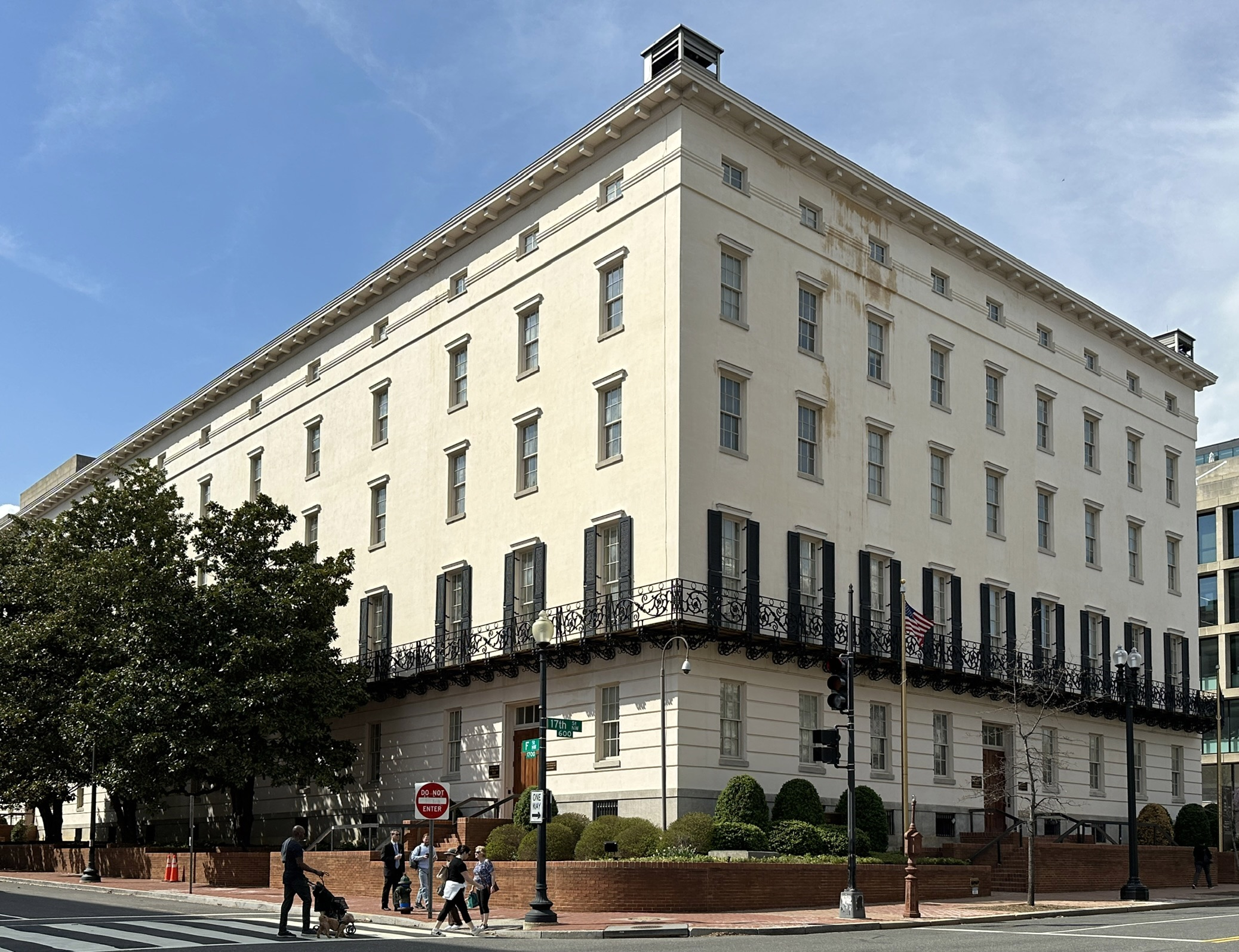
- Winder Building in 2026

- Location within Central Washington, D.C.
- Location: 604 17th Street, N.W. Washington, D.C.
- Coordinates: 38°53′51″N 77°2′25″W
- Built: 1848
- Architect: Richard A. Gilpin
- Architectural style: Federal
- NRHP reference No.: 69000303
- Added to NRHP: March 24, 1969

The Winder Building is an office building in Washington, D.C., just west of the White House. It is located at 604 17th Street, Northwest, Washington, D.C.

== History ==
It was designed by Richard A. Gilpin, (or Robert Mills), for W. H. Winder, a nephew of Gen. William H. Winder. It was leased as government offices.

The government purchased it in 1854 for US$200,000. It was originally covered in stucco, which was stripped and brick painted. The windows have been replaced. The building is maintained by the General Services Administration and occupied by the Office of the United States Trade Representative, since 1981.

It was occupied by the Office of Emergency Planning/Preparedness in the 1960s through 1973 when that agency was abolished and its functions transferred to other federal agencies. It was threatened with demolition in 1974. The building was placed on the National Register of Historic Places in 1969.

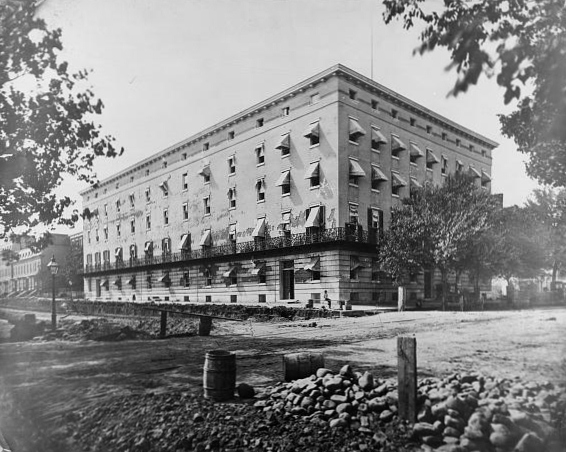
The Winder Building

Central Signal Station, Winder Building, 17th and E Streets NW, and Signal Corps men
