= Wesley Grapp =

American FBI agent (1918–2011)

Wesley Gleason Grapp (1918 – November 1, 2011) was an American FBI agent. He served as head of the Los Angeles Federal Bureau of Investigation (FBI) office. He was the agent who carried out Hoover's orders to give FBI information to University of California senior regent Edwin W. Pauley. Pauley allegedly had a history of political connections with the Office of Strategic Services (OSS), forerunner of today's CIA, as well as a close association with Allen Dulles, OSS, later to serve as director of the Central Intelligence Agency, (1953–1961).

== Biography ==
Wesley Gleason Grapp was born in Aberdeen, South Dakota, on October 19, 1918. He left the FBI in 1972 after 26 years of service and headed security for Flying Tigers Airlines until his retirement in 1982. During World War II, he served in the U.S. Navy in the Pacific Theatre. Grapp died of natural causes in Calabasas, California, on November 1, 2011, at the age of 93.

== Sources ==
- Where are they now? / Other key players
