= United States Trade Representative =

United States trade body

Office of the United States Trade Representative
- Seal of the Office of the U.S. Trade Representative

- Flag of the Office of the U.S. Trade Representative

Agency overview
- Formed: 1962
- Preceding agency: Office of the Special Trade Representative
- Headquarters: Winder Building 600 17th St. NW Washington, D.C.
- Employees: 200
- Annual budget: $73 million (FY 2021)
- Agency executive: Jamieson Greer, Trade Representative
- Parent agency: Executive Office of the President
- Website: ustr.gov

The Office of the United States Trade Representative (USTR) is an agency of the United States federal government responsible for developing and promoting United States foreign trade policies. Part of the Executive Office of the President, it is headed by the United States trade representative, a Cabinet-level position that serves as the primary advisor, negotiator, and spokesperson for the president of the United States on trade matters. USTR has more than two hundred employees, with offices in Washington, D.C.; Geneva, Switzerland; and Brussels, Belgium.

USTR was established as the Office of the Special Trade Representative (STR) by the Trade Expansion Act of 1962, leads trade negotiations at bilateral and multilateral levels, and coordinates trade policy with other government agencies through the Trade Policy Committee (TPC), Trade Policy Committee Review Group (TPCRG), and Trade Policy Staff Committee (TPSC). Its areas of expertise include foreign direct investment, commodity agreements, trade-related intellectual property protection, and trade disputes before the World Trade Organization. Based in Washington, D.C., Jamieson Greer is the current United States trade representative.

== Organization ==
=== Leadership ===
The head of the office holds the title of United States Trade Representative (USTR), which is a Cabinet-level position, though not technically within the Cabinet, as is the case with office heads not of US departments but rather of offices contained within the Executive Office of the President. To fill the post, the president nominates someone for the position, and the appointment is then approved or rejected by a simple majority of the Senate. The United States trade representative and deputy United States trade representatives (DUSTR) carry the title of ambassador.

In the Obama administration, Michael Froman served as the US trade representative from 2013 to 2017, with Michael Punke and Robert Holleyman serving as deputy US trade representatives. Ambassador Punke also concurrently served as the U.S. ambassador to the World Trade Organization (WTO). Robert Lighthizer served during the Trump's first presidency. Katherine Tai served during the presidency of Joe Biden.

=== Office of WTO and Multilateral Affairs ===
The USTR participates in the World Trade Organization, which is currently in the Doha Development Round. This is partially managed by the USTR Office of WTO and Multilateral Affairs (WAMA). Relevant WTO agreements include the Agreement on Trade-Related Aspects of Intellectual Property Rights (TRIPS) and the Generalized System of Preferences.

== History of the United States trade representative ==
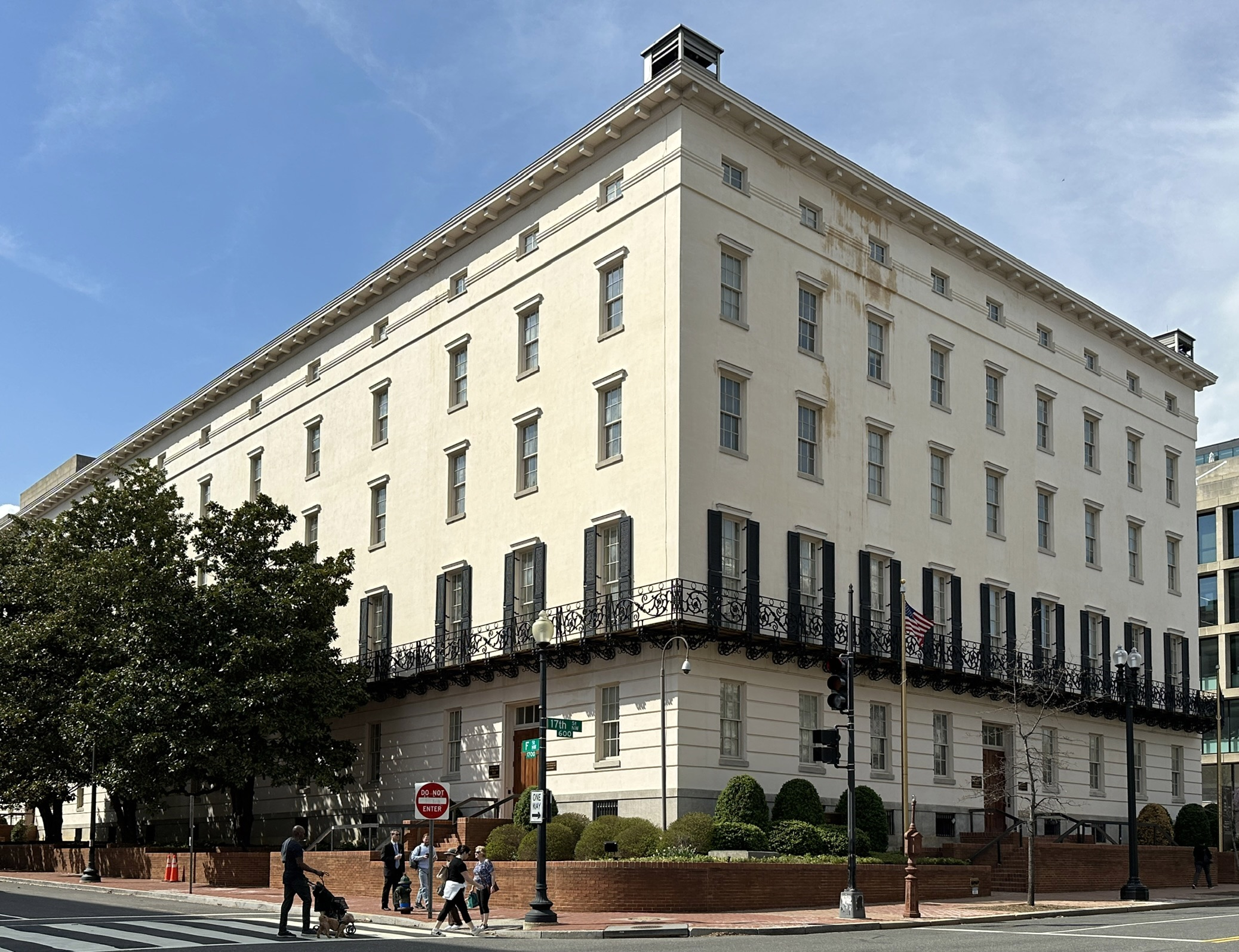
United States Trade Representative offices are located in the Winder Building.

Trade negotiations became more complicated in the twentieth century with the rise of multilateral organizations and technological advances allowing for more commerce. As a result, the organization of the U.S. government (with Congress in charge of regulating foreign commerce and the executive branch in charge of treaties) became less efficient and in 1962 Congress passed a bill calling for the president to appoint a Special Representative for Trade Negotiations who would make suggestions to the president on the matters of trade. In the 1970s, Congress expanded this position, making it more accountable to Congress (the position has been called "a creature of congress"), and made it cabinet-level. Finally, in 1980 the position was renamed the United States Trade Representative.

The Omnibus Trade and Competitiveness Act of 1988 elevated the position's role to "coordinate trade policy, serve as the President's principal trade advisor and trade 'spokesperson', and lead U.S. international trade negotiations". It also "required the USTR to report to both the President and Congress".

== Issue areas ==
- Agriculture
- Economy and trade
- Enforcement
- Environment
- Government procurement
- Industry and manufacturing
- Intellectual property
- Labor
- Preference Programs
- Services and Investment
- Small Business
- Textiles and apparel
- Trade and development
- Trade organizations (The World Trade Organization (WTO), Asia-Pacific Economic Cooperation (APEC), Association of Southeast Asian Nations (ASEAN), and the Organization for Economic Co-operation and Development (OECD).

== Reports ==
=== National Trade Estimate ===
The National Trade Estimate Report on Foreign Trade Barriers (National Trade Estimate or NTE) is an annual series prepared by the USTR, which reports significant foreign barriers to U.S. exports. Since 1986, the NTE has provided, where feasible, quantitative estimates of the impact of these foreign practices on the value of U.S. exports. Information is also included on actions taken to eliminate barriers. It is based on information provided by USTR, the U.S. departments of commerce and agriculture, and other agencies and sources.

=== The Special 301 Report ===
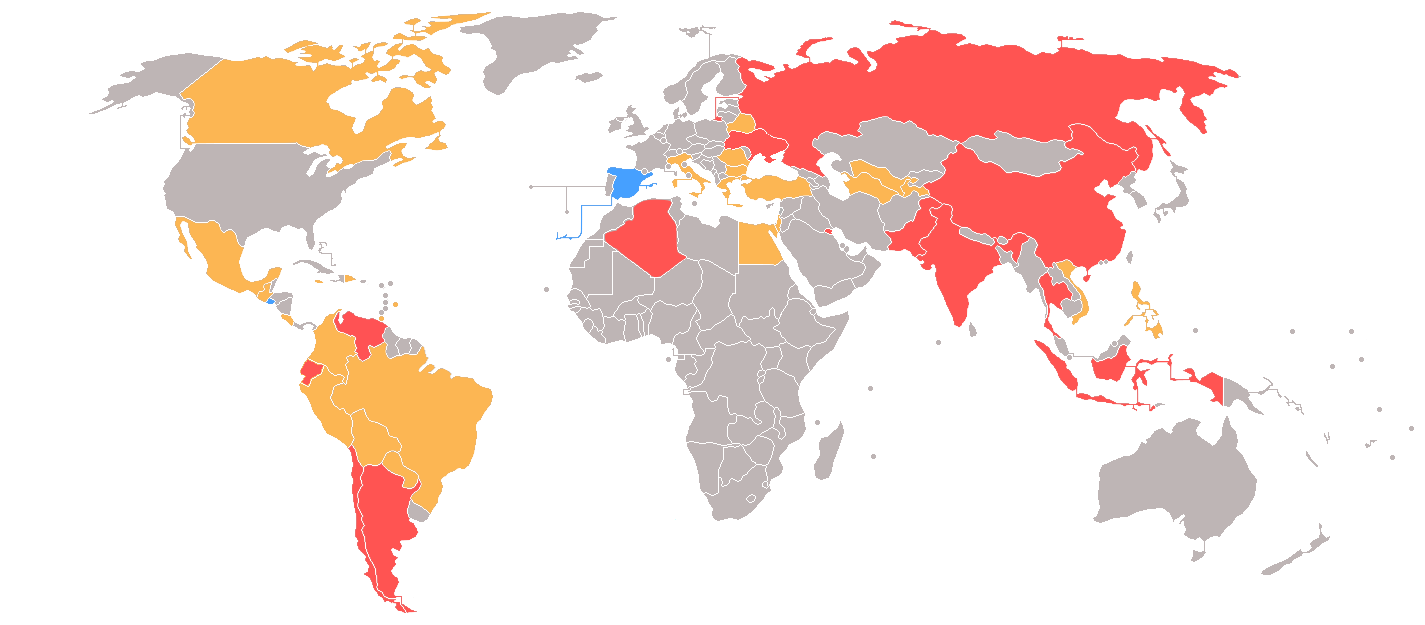
Priority Foreign Country Priority Watch List Watch List Section 306 Monitoring Out-of-Cycle Review/Status Pending

The Special 301 Report is prepared annually by the USTR under Section 182 as amended of the Trade Act of 1974. The act states that the USTR must on an annual basis, by April of each year:

identify those foreign countries that deny adequate and effective protection of intellectual property rights, or deny fair and equitable markets access to United States persons that rely upon intellectual property protection, and those foreign countries identified under" this "paragraph that are determined by the Trade Representative to be priority foreign countries". The Act defines "priority foreign countries" as "those foreign countries that have the most onerous or egregious acts, policies, or practices that deny adequate and effective intellectual property rights, or deny fair and equitable market access to United States persons that rely upon intellectual property protection, whose acts, policies, or practices described in" this "paragraph have the greatest adverse impact (actual or potential) on the relevant United States products, and that are not entering into good faith negotiations, or making significant progress in bilateral or multilateral negotiations to provide adequate and effective protection of intellectual property rights.

The Uruguay Round Agreement Act furthermore states that countries may be identified under Special 301 "taking into account the history of intellectual property laws and practices of the foreign country, including any previous identifications" and "the history of efforts of the United States, and the response of the foreign country, to achieve adequate and effective protection and enforcement of intellectual property rights". It also states that compliance with the Agreement on Trade-Related Aspects of Intellectual Property Rights does not include a country from being identified as denying "adequate and effective protection of intellectual property rights".

=== Notorious markets ===
In 2006, along with the International Intellectual Property Alliance, the USTR published a list of places where large-scale copyright infringement takes place in the Special 301 Report. Since 2010, the notorious markets report has been published as a separate report.

=== Trade Strategy to Combat Forced Labor ===
In December 2025, USTR under Katherine Tai released the first-ever Trade Strategy to Combat Forced Labor.

== List of United States trade representatives ==
Denotes an acting U.S. trade representative

#	Portrait	Name	Term start	Term end	Duration	President(s)
1		Christian Herter	December 10, 1962	December 30, 1966	4 years, 20 days	John F. Kennedy (1961–1963)
1		Christian Herter	December 10, 1962	December 30, 1966	4 years, 20 days	Lyndon Johnson (1963–1969)
2		William Roth	March 24, 1967	January 20, 1969	1 year, 302 days	Lyndon Johnson (1963–1969)
3		Carl Gilbert	August 6, 1969	September 21, 1971	2 years, 46 days	Richard Nixon (1969–1974)
4		William Eberle	November 12, 1971	December 24, 1974	3 years, 42 days	Richard Nixon (1969–1974)
5		Frederick Dent	March 26, 1975	January 20, 1977	1 year, 300 days	Gerald Ford (1974–1977)
6		Robert Strauss	March 30, 1977	August 17, 1979	2 years, 140 days	Jimmy Carter (1977–1981)
7		Reubin Askew	October 1, 1979	December 31, 1980	1 year, 91 days	Jimmy Carter (1977–1981)
8		Bill Brock	January 23, 1981	April 29, 1985	4 years, 96 days	Ronald Reagan (1981–1989)
9		Clayton Yeutter	July 1, 1985	January 20, 1989	3 years, 203 days	Ronald Reagan (1981–1989)
10		Carla Hills	February 6, 1989	January 20, 1993	3 years, 349 days	George H. W. Bush (1989–1993)
11		Mickey Kantor	January 22, 1993	April 12, 1996	3 years, 81 days	Bill Clinton (1993–2001)
—		Charlene Barshefsky	April 12, 1996	March 18, 1997	4 years, 283 days	Bill Clinton (1993–2001)
12		Charlene Barshefsky	March 18, 1997	January 20, 2001	4 years, 283 days	Bill Clinton (1993–2001)
13		Robert Zoellick	February 7, 2001	February 22, 2005	4 years, 15 days	George W. Bush (2001–2009)
—		Peter Allgeier; Acting	February 23, 2005	May 16, 2005	113 days	George W. Bush (2001–2009)
14		Rob Portman	May 17, 2005	May 29, 2006	1 year, 12 days	George W. Bush (2001–2009)
15		Susan Schwab	June 8, 2006	January 20, 2009	2 years, 196 days	George W. Bush (2001–2009)
—		Peter Allgeier; Acting	January 21, 2009	March 17, 2009	55 days	Barack Obama (2009–2017)
16		Ron Kirk	March 18, 2009	March 15, 2013	3 years, 362 days	Barack Obama (2009–2017)
—		Demetrios Marantis; Acting	March 15, 2013	May 23, 2013	100 days	Barack Obama (2009–2017)
—		Miriam Sapiro; Acting	May 23, 2013	June 21, 2013	28 days	Barack Obama (2009–2017)
17		Michael Froman	June 21, 2013	January 20, 2017	3 years, 213 days	Barack Obama (2009–2017)
—		Maria Pagan; Acting	January 20, 2017	March 1, 2017	40 days	Donald Trump (2017–2021)
—		Stephen Vaughn; Acting	March 2, 2017	May 15, 2017	74 days	Donald Trump (2017–2021)
18		Robert Lighthizer	May 15, 2017	January 20, 2021	3 years, 250 days	Donald Trump (2017–2021)
—		Maria Pagan; Acting	January 20, 2021	March 18, 2021	57 days	Joe Biden (2021–2025)
19		Katherine Tai	March 18, 2021	January 20, 2025	3 years, 308 days	Joe Biden (2021–2025)
—		Juan Millán; Acting	January 20, 2025	February 27, 2025	38 days	Donald Trump (2025–present)
20		Jamieson Greer	February 27, 2025	Incumbent	1 year, 258 days	Donald Trump (2025–present)

== See also ==
- International Trade Administration
- United States International Trade Commission
- United States Commercial Service
