= Frederick B. Dent =

American politician

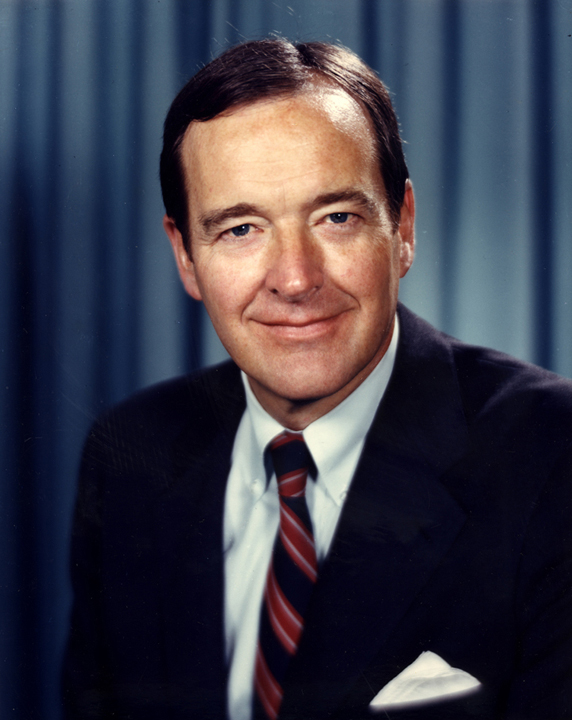

5th United States Trade Representative
- In office March 26, 1975 – January 20, 1977
- President: Gerald Ford
- Preceded by: William Denman Eberle
- Succeeded by: Robert S. Strauss

21st United States Secretary of Commerce
- In office February 2, 1973 – March 26, 1975
- President: Richard Nixon; Gerald Ford
- Preceded by: Peter G. Peterson
- Succeeded by: Rogers Morton

Personal details
- Born: Frederick Baily Dent; August 17, 1922 Cape May, New Jersey, U.S.
- Died: December 10, 2019 (aged 97) Spartanburg, South Carolina, U.S.
- Party: Republican
- Spouse: Millie Carrington Harrison (m. 1944; died 1997)
- Children: 5
- Education: Yale University (BA)

Military service
- Allegiance: United States
- Branch/service: United States Navy
- Years of service: 1943–1946
- Rank: Lieutenant Junior Grade
- Battles/wars: World War II

Frederick Baily Dent (August 17, 1922 – December 10, 2019) was an American businessman who served as the United States Secretary of Commerce from February 2, 1973, to March 26, 1975, during the administrations of U.S. Presidents Richard Nixon and Gerald Ford.

== Early life and education ==
Dent was born on August 17, 1922, in Cape May, New Jersey, to Edith (née Baily) and Magruder Dent. He was raised in Greenwich, Connecticut, and attended St. Paul's School followed by Yale University, where he lettered in football. Dent was an officer in the Navy's ROTC program at Yale.

== Career ==
Dent served in the United States Navy from 1943 until 1946. In the Navy, Dent was the Lieutenant Junior Grade, where he captained the sub chaser USS PC 1547 and the patrol craft USS PCE(C) 873. He saw action in the Pacific where his patrol craft ferried troops to beachheads, including Okinawa, in the final stages of World War II. From 1958 until 1972 and 1977 until 1988, Dent was the president of Mayfair Mills in Arcadia, South Carolina.

He was appointed secretary of commerce by President Richard Nixon, serving from February 2, 1973, to March 26, 1975, and was President Gerald Ford's Trade Representative, from March 26, 1975, to January 20, 1977.

He was inducted into the South Carolina Business Hall of Fame in 1994.

== Personal life ==
On March 11, 1944, Dent married Mildred "Millie" Carrington Harrison. They had five children. He resided in Spartanburg, South Carolina.

Dent died on December 10, 2019, at the age of 97. He was the last surviving secretary of commerce during the Nixon and Ford administrations.

Political offices
Preceded by Pete Peterson	United States Secretary of Commerce; 1973–1975	Succeeded by Rogers Morton
Preceded by William Eberle	United States Trade Representative; 1975–1977	Succeeded by Robert Strauss
