= William Denman Eberle =

American politician

Bill Eberle

4th United States Trade Representative
- In office November 12, 1971 – December 24, 1974
- President: Richard Nixon; Gerald Ford
- Preceded by: Carl J. Gilbert
- Succeeded by: Frederick Dent

Personal details
- Born: June 5, 1923 Boise, Idaho, U.S.
- Died: April 3, 2008 (aged 84) Concord, Massachusetts, U.S.
- Party: Republican
- Spouse: Jean Eberle
- Children: 4
- Education: Stanford University (BA); Harvard University (MBA, LLB)

William Denman Eberle (June 5, 1923 – April 3, 2008) was an American politician and businessman from Idaho who held the office of Trade Representative from 1971 to 1974 under Presidents Richard Nixon and Gerald Ford.

== Biography ==
Eberle was born in Boise, Idaho. He attended Boise High School, Stanford University and Harvard Law School. Eberle married the former Jean C. Quick and they had four children: Jeffrey, W. David, Francis Q. and Cilista C. Eberle.

Eberle was a co-founder of pulp and paper company Boise Cascade and was chief executive officer of manufacturing firm American Standard. From 1953 to 1961, he was a member of the Idaho House of Representatives.

Eberle served as Trade Representative during the Nixon and Ford administrations, from 1971 to 1974. During his time as chief trade negotiator, he pushed Europe and Japan to lower trade barriers. He also pressed trading partners to give American farmers and businesses more access to overseas markets. He resigned and was succeeded by Frederick B. Dent, who resigned as Commerce Secretary.

Eberle died of renal failure in Concord, Massachusetts on April 3, 2008.

Political offices
Preceded by Carl Gilbert	United States Trade Representative; 1971–1974	Succeeded by Frederick Dent
