= Responsibilities Program =

The Responsibilities Program was the code name for a Federal Bureau of Investigation program active from 1951 to 1955. Under this program the FBI would give reports about possible subversives to state governors and civic leaders.
