= Elinor Raas Heller =

American academic administrator

- Born: October 3, 1904
- Died: August 15, 1987 (age 82)
- Education: B.A. Mills College
- Spouse: Edward Hellman Heller
- Children: 3, including Elizabeth Heller, married to Alan Mandell

Elinor Raas Heller (October 3, 1904 – August 15, 1987) was an American academic administrator. From 1961–1976 she was a Regent of the University of California. She served as Chair in 1975–1976, and Vice-Chair in 1968–1969 and 1971–1972. In 1973 she was appointed to serve on California's Postsecondary Education Commission. She received the Clark Kerr Award in 1976.

== Biography ==
Heller was born in San Francisco, California. She graduated from Mills College in 1925. At the time of the Berkeley Free Speech Movement in 1964, another regent, Edwin Pauley, with the covert assistance of the FBI, attempted to remove her from the board. She was one of six regents who voted against the firing of Angela Davis in 1969.

Heller was also a member of the Democratic National Committee (1944–1952) and the World Affairs Council of Northern California. She was an alternate delegate to the 1944 Democratic National Convention, and a delegate in 1948 and 1956. In the 1952 presidential election, she was a candidate for Presidential Elector in California on behalf of Adlai Stevenson. In 1974, Heller was elected a Fellow of the American Academy of Arts and Sciences.

She was awarded the UCSF medal in 1978.

== Personal life ==
In 1925, she married financier Edward Hellman Heller, grandson of banker Isaias W. Hellman. The couple resided in Atherton, California and had three children. Edward Heller died in 1961. Her daughter was arts patron Elizabeth Heller Mandell, married to Alan Mandell.
