= Halloween Massacre (Ford administration) =

1975 American cabinet reorganization

"Halloween Massacre" is the term associated with the major reorganization of the cabinet of U.S. president Gerald Ford on November 4, 1975, which was an attempt to address multiple high-level personality and policy clashes within the administration. The overhaul came at a time when the president's leadership abilities were being broadly questioned, and he was being heavily criticized by California governor (and future president) Ronald Reagan and others from the nascent conservative wing of the Republican Party.

== Cabinet shake-up ==
The shake-up had its roots at the beginning of Ford's presidency in August 1974. As was the case when Lyndon B. Johnson and Harry S. Truman succeeded to the presidency intra-term, in 1963 and in 1945 respectively, under similarly strained sets of circumstances, Ford inherited President Richard Nixon's cabinet and staff of presidential advisers. The Nixon and new Ford appointees often clashed, and the resulting acrimony often got in the way of policy making.

On October 25, 1975, Donald Rumsfeld and Dick Cheney submitted their resignations to the president. Attached to the resignation letters was a memo with their detailed analysis of the perceived problems, and possible future strategies for the Ford administration. The analysis blamed the majority of the problems on Robert T. Hartmann, Henry Kissinger, and Vice President Nelson Rockefeller.

Starting November 4, 1975, which was the Tuesday after the Halloween weekend, and which was timed to fit in the congressional confirmation window, Ford terminated several Nixon holdovers, and announced the names of the successors and new Cabinet nominees.

The changes were:

- Henry Kissinger was replaced by Brent Scowcroft as National Security Advisor, while retaining his post as Secretary of State.
- William Colby was replaced by Ambassador (and future President) George H. W. Bush as Director of Central Intelligence. Colby was offered the post of US Permanent Representative to NATO, but declined.
- James R. Schlesinger was replaced by Chief of Staff Donald Rumsfeld as Secretary of Defense. Rumsfeld's deputy and protégé, future Vice President Dick Cheney, moved up to be the Chief of Staff.
- Under pressure from Republican Party conservatives, Nelson Rockefeller announced that he would not run for election as Ford's running mate in 1976.

Subsequent to these events, Rogers Morton was also replaced by Elliot Richardson as Secretary of Commerce.

== Impact and legacy ==
Various newspaper and magazine articles at the time identified Rumsfeld as having orchestrated these events. At the time, Ford said he alone was responsible for firings. Later, he expressed regret: "I was angry at myself for showing cowardice in not saying to the ultraconservatives, 'It's going to be Ford and Rockefeller, whatever the consequences.'"

== See also ==
- Saturday Night Massacre, a similarly named event during the Nixon Administration
