= Ray C. Bliss =

American politician (1907–1981)

Ray Bliss

Chair of the Republican National Committee
- In office April 1, 1965 – April 14, 1969
- Preceded by: Dean Burch
- Succeeded by: Rogers Morton

Personal details
- Born: Ray Charles Bliss; December 16, 1907; Akron, Ohio, U.S.
- Died: August 6, 1981 (aged 73); Akron, Ohio, U.S.
- Political party: Republican
- Education: University of Akron (BA)

Ray Charles Bliss (December 16, 1907 – August 6, 1981) was one of the important national U.S. Republican Party leaders of the 1960s and served as chairman of the Republican National Committee from 1965 to 1969. He helped to pull the Republican party back together after Barry Goldwater's defeat in 1964 and his work culminated in the election of Richard M. Nixon as president in 1968. He had been Ohio Republican state chair (1949–1965) and was a delegate to Republican National Convention from Ohio in 1952, 1956, 1960, 1964, 1972. In his reflections on the Campaign of 1960, then Vice President Richard Nixon described Ray Bliss as, "one of the best political craftsman of the nation." Nixon attributed his success amongst Democratic and independent voters in Ohio to Bliss' belief in the "simple axiom that it is the responsibility of a party chairman 'not to eliminate but to assimilate.'"

Bliss was an Akron, Ohio native and 1935 graduate of the University of Akron where he was initiated as a member of Phi Kappa Tau fraternity. Bliss is the namesake of the Ray C. Bliss Institute of Applied Politics established in 1986 at the University of Akron to promote citizen knowledge and participation in the political process, values in which Bliss strongly believed. Bliss served over nine years on the University of Akron board of trustees and was chair of the board at the time of his death.

Party political offices
Preceded by Dean Burch	Chair of the Republican National Committee; 1965–1969	Succeeded by Rogers Morton
