= Kenneth Rush =

American diplomat (1910–1994)

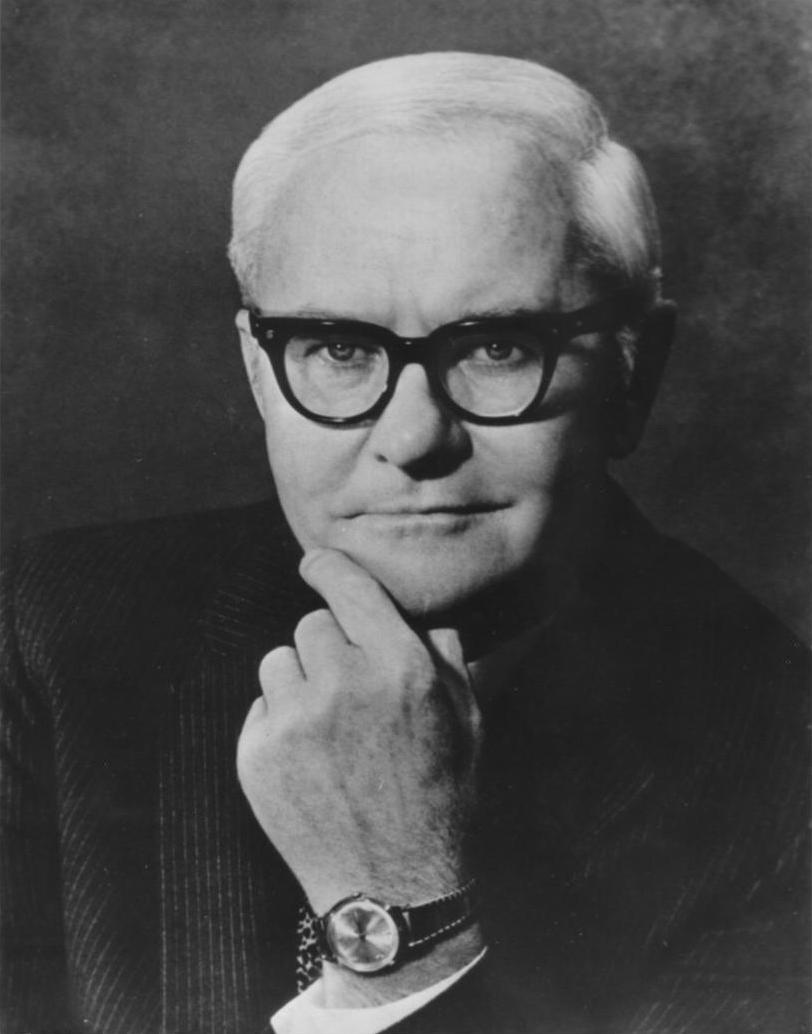

United States Ambassador to France
- In office November 21, 1974 – March 14, 1977
- President: Gerald Ford; Jimmy Carter
- Preceded by: John N. Irwin II
- Succeeded by: Arthur A. Hartman

Counselor to the President
- In office May 29, 1974 – September 19, 1974
- President: Richard Nixon; Gerald Ford
- Preceded by: Anne Armstrong
- Succeeded by: Robert T. Hartmann; John Otho Marsh Jr.

2nd United States Deputy Secretary of State
- In office February 2, 1973 – May 29, 1974
- President: Richard Nixon
- Preceded by: John N. Irwin II
- Succeeded by: Robert S. Ingersoll

14th United States Deputy Secretary of Defense
- In office February 23, 1972 – January 29, 1973
- President: Richard Nixon
- Preceded by: David Packard
- Succeeded by: Bill Clements

United States Ambassador to West Germany
- In office July 22, 1969 – February 20, 1972
- President: Richard Nixon
- Preceded by: Henry Cabot Lodge Jr.
- Succeeded by: Martin J. Hillenbrand

Personal details
- Born: January 17, 1910 Walla Walla, Washington, U.S.
- Died: December 11, 1994 (aged 84) Delray Beach, Florida, U.S.
- Party: Republican
- Spouse: Jane Gilbert Smith (m. 1947–1994)
- Children: 6
- Education: University of Tennessee (BA); Yale University (LLB)

David Kenneth Rush (January 17, 1910 – December 11, 1994) was a United States Ambassador who helped negotiate the groundbreaking Four-Power Agreement in 1971 that ended the post-war crisis over Berlin. He also served as Counselor to President Nixon in 1974. He served as Deputy Secretary of State from 1972–1974.

== Early life ==
Kenneth Rush was born David Kenneth Rush in Walla Walla, Washington, where his parents, from an old Tennessee family, had journeyed during a yearlong tour of the western United States. His father was a farmer in Greenville, Tennessee, and his mother a teacher. His father died when he was two years old. After attending secondary schools in Greenville, Rush worked his way through the University of Tennessee by waiting on tables. He majored in history and was elected into the Phi Beta Kappa. In 1932, he enrolled in Yale Law School, where he edited the law journal and earned an LL.B. degree.

== Career ==
=== Early career ===
From 1936 to 1937, Rush joined the Duke University faculty as an assistant professor and taught law. It was here that he met to-be-President Richard Nixon who was a student at the university. It was the beginning of their enduring friendship. In 1937, Rush accepted an offer to join the Union Carbide and Carbon Corporation with the prospect of an executive position. He became a vice president in 1939 and was named president in 1966.

=== Political career ===
Rush resigned from all private positions in 1969 to become United States Ambassador to West Germany. Rush was credited for playing a major role in rushing the successful conclusion of the Four Power Agreement on Berlin between the United States, Britain, Soviet Union, and France after 17 months of negotiations. The agreement ended more than two decades of east–west tensions over the divided former capital of Germany; it improved ties between Washington and Moscow, reaffirmed the Western Allies' rights in the city and paved the way for the development of peaceful relations between East and West Germany.

President Richard Nixon appointed Rush as Deputy Secretary of Defense for 1972 under Melvin Laird, then named him Deputy Secretary of State from February 1973 to May 1974, including a period from September 3 to September 22 when Rush served as interim Secretary of State between the terms of William P. Rogers and Henry Kissinger. On May 25, 1974, he was appointed counselor to the president for economic policy. From 1974 to his retirement on March 15, 1977, he served as Ambassador to France.

== Death ==
Rush died at his home in Delray Beach, Florida, on December 11, 1994, at the age of 84. He was remembered by the New York Times as, "a United States Ambassador helped negotiate the ground-breaking four-power agreement in 1971 that ended the post-war crises over Berlin." According to one of his sons, he was under treatment for heart and blood ailments.

== Personal life ==
In 1947, Rush married Jane Gilbert Smith. They had five sons and one daughter. Two of their sons died at a young age.

Diplomatic posts
Preceded by Henry Cabot Lodge Jr.	United States Ambassador to West Germany; 1969–1972	Succeeded by Martin J. Hillenbrand
Preceded by John N. Irwin	United States Ambassador to France; 1974–1977	Succeeded by Arthur A. Hartman
Political offices
Preceded by David Packard	United States Deputy Secretary of Defense; 1972–1973	Succeeded by Bill Clements
Preceded by John N. Irwin	United States Deputy Secretary of State; 1973–1974	Succeeded by Robert S. Ingersoll
Preceded by Anne Armstrong	Counselor to the President; 1974; Served alongside: Anne Armstrong, Dean Burch	Succeeded by Robert T. Hartmann
Preceded by Anne Armstrong	Counselor to the President; 1974; Served alongside: Anne Armstrong, Dean Burch	Succeeded by John O. Marsh
