= Dean Burch =

American lawyer and politician (1927–1991)

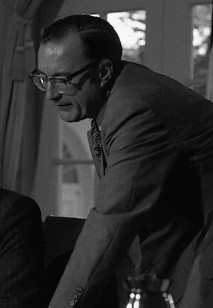

Counselor to the President
- In office March 8, 1974 – December 31, 1974
- President: Richard Nixon; Gerald Ford
- Preceded by: Anne Armstrong
- Succeeded by: Robert T. Hartmann; John Marsh

Chairman of the Federal Communications Commission
- In office October 31, 1969 – March 8, 1974
- President: Richard Nixon
- Preceded by: Rosel H. Hyde
- Succeeded by: Richard E. Wiley

Chairman of the Republican National Committee
- In office July 16, 1964 – April 1, 1965
- Preceded by: William E. Miller
- Succeeded by: Ray Bliss

Personal details
- Born: Roy Dean Burch; December 20, 1927 Enid, Oklahoma, U.S.
- Died: August 4, 1991 (aged 63) Potomac, Maryland, U.S.
- Party: Republican
- Spouse: Patricia Meeks (1961–1991)
- Children: 3, including Shelly
- Education: University of Arizona (LLB)

Roy Dean Burch (December 20, 1927 – August 4, 1991) was an American lawyer and lobbyist. He served as chairman of the Federal Communications Commission (FCC) from October 1969 to March 1974 and Counselor to the President in 1974, during the administrations of U.S. President Richard Nixon and Gerald Ford. From 1964 to 1965, he was the chairman of the Republican National Committee, during the Barry Goldwater presidential campaign.

== Life and career ==
Burch was born in Enid, Oklahoma. He earned a Bachelor of Laws degree from the University of Arizona in Tucson, Arizona, where he began his own law practice. Burch began working in 1955 on Goldwater's staff. He headed the national party while Denison Kitchel, a Phoenix lawyer, was the national Goldwater campaign chairman. Because of the weak Republican performance in the 1964 elections, Burch was replaced early in 1965 by Ray C. Bliss of Ohio.

In 1968, Burch worked in the campaign to return Goldwater to the US Senate for the seat vacated by retiring Democrat Carl Hayden. Because of his presidential nomination, Goldwater gave up his Senate seat but returned to the upper chamber after a four-year absence and served another eighteen years.

As the FCC chairman, Burch advocated for more and better programs for younger audiences. The networks soon revised the Saturday morning schedules. Under Burch, a study was conducted to determine whether one company should be allowed to own a daily newspaper and a television station in the same city. In 1975, shortly after Burch left the commission, the FCC unanimously prohibited the formation of new combinations of newspapers and broadcasting stations but allowed existing ones to continue.

In 1980, Burch was chief of staff on the Republican vice presidential campaign of George H. W. Bush, the running mate of Ronald Reagan.

From 1959 to 1963 and again from 1965 to 1969, Burch was a partner in the law firm of Dunseath, Stubbs & Burch in Tucson; from 1975 to 1987, he was affiliated with Pierson, Ball & Dowd in Washington, D.C.

From 1987 until his death from bladder cancer at 63 years old in Potomac Maryland, Burch was director general of Intelsat, the global satellite consortium. In the preceding decades, he was a telecommunications lawyer and White House counselor.

Party political offices
Preceded by William E. Miller	Chairman of the Republican National Committee; 1964–1965	Succeeded by Ray Bliss
Government offices
Preceded by Rosel H. Hyde	Chairman of the Federal Communications Commission; 1969–1974	Succeeded by Richard E. Wiley
Political offices
Preceded by Anne Armstrong	Counselor to the President; 1974; Served alongside: Anne Armstrong, Kenneth Rush	Succeeded by Robert Hartmann
Preceded by Anne Armstrong	Counselor to the President; 1974; Served alongside: Anne Armstrong, Kenneth Rush	Succeeded by John Marsh
