= John O. Marsh Jr. =

American politician from Virginia (1926–2019)

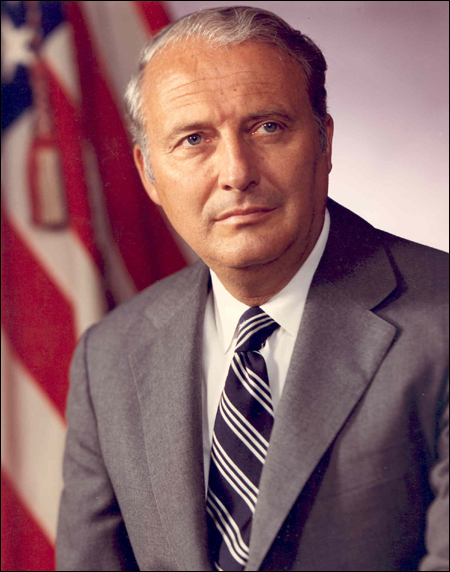

14th United States Secretary of the Army
- In office January 30, 1981 – August 14, 1989
- President: Ronald Reagan; George H. W. Bush
- Preceded by: Clifford Alexander Jr.
- Succeeded by: Michael P. W. Stone

Counselor to the President
- In office August 9, 1974 – January 20, 1977 Serving with Robert Hartmann, Rogers Morton
- President: Gerald Ford
- Preceded by: Anne Armstrong; Dean Burch; Kenneth Rush
- Succeeded by: Edwin Meese (1981)

Assistant Secretary of Defense for Legislative Affairs
- In office April 17, 1973 – February 15, 1974
- President: Richard Nixon
- Preceded by: Rady A. Johnson
- Succeeded by: John M. Maury

Member of the U.S. House of Representatives from Virginia's 7th district
- In office January 3, 1963 – January 3, 1971
- Preceded by: Burr Harrison
- Succeeded by: Kenneth Robinson

Personal details
- Born: August 7, 1926 Winchester, Virginia, U.S.
- Died: February 4, 2019 (aged 92) Raphine, Virginia, U.S.
- Party: Democratic (Before 1980s); Republican (1980s–2019)
- Education: Washington and Lee University (LLB)

Military service
- Branch/service: United States Army
- Years of service: 1944–1947 (Active); 1947–1951 (Reserve); 1951–1976 (Guard)
- Rank: Lieutenant Colonel
- Unit: United States Army Reserve; Army National Guard
- Battles/wars: Allied-occupied Germany; Vietnam War

John Otho Marsh Jr. (August 7, 1926 – February 4, 2019) was an American politician and an adjunct professor at George Mason University School of Law. He served as the United States Secretary of the Army from 1981 to 1989, and as a member of the United States House of Representatives from Virginia 1963 to 1971.

== Early life ==
Marsh was born in Winchester, Virginia. He graduated from Harrisonburg High School in Harrisonburg, Virginia. He enlisted in the United States Army in 1944, during World War II, and was selected at age eighteen for Infantry Officer Candidate School (OCS) graduating as a second lieutenant of infantry in November 1945, then assigned to the Army of Occupation of Germany where he served from 1946 to 1947. He was a member of the United States Army Reserve from 1947 to 1951.

Marsh graduated from Washington and Lee University in 1951, where he was a member of Phi Kappa Psi fraternity. He entered the Army National Guard in Virginia in 1951 and graduated from the Army's Airborne School in 1964. He retired from the army in 1976 with the rank of lieutenant colonel.

== Career ==
Meanwhile, in 1952, Marsh was admitted to the Virginia Bar, and started practicing law in Strasburg, Virginia, where he served as town judge. From 1954 to 1962, he was the town attorney in New Market, Virginia.

=== United States Representative ===
He served in the United States House of Representatives as a Democrat from Virginia from 1963 to 1971. He fought in the Vietnam War for a month without telling his fellow soldiers he was a Congressman.

Marsh was the last Democrat to represent this district, which stretched from Winchester through Harrisonburg to Charlottesville. The district, which was the home district of Senators Harry Byrd Sr. and Jr., had been moving away from its Southern Democratic roots for some time; residents had been splitting their tickets since the 1930s even as it continued to elect conservative Democrats like Marsh. As proof of how rapidly the district was trending away from the Democrats, in his first run for the seat, Marsh only defeated Republican challenger J. Kenneth Robinson by 598 votes.

Following Marsh's retirement, Robinson, who by this time represented much of the district's western portion (including the Byrds' home) in the Senate of Virginia, won the seat easily, and the 7th would be held by Republicans until it was dismantled in 1993. Proving just how Republican this district now was, Marsh would be the last Democrat to win even 40 percent of the district's vote before it was dismantled.

=== Ford cabinet ===
In 1973, he was appointed as United States Assistant Secretary of Defense, and in January 1974, as National Security Advisor for Vice President Gerald Ford. Under President Ford, he became Counselor to the President and held Cabinet rank. He was seen as one of Ford's top advisers alongside Henry Kissinger, Donald Rumsfeld and Philip W. Buchen.

=== United States Secretary of the Army ===
From 1981 to 1989, he served as the United States Secretary of the Army under President Ronald Reagan.

Of his tenure as the Secretary of the Army, Marsh said "I didn't become Secretary of the Army to go around hangdog and half ashamed, apologizing for the United States Army in Vietnam, because it needed no apologies."

== Later career ==
Marsh was then selected to serve as chairman of the Reserve Forces Policy Board, a position he held from 1989 until 1994. He later served as chairman and interim CEO of Novavax, Inc., a pharmaceutical company. He subsequently sat on its board of directors.

Marsh was a confidant of Dick Cheney when the latter was vice president.

From 1998 to 1999, Marsh was visiting professor of ethics at the Virginia Military Institute, and adjunct professor of law at The College of William & Mary from 1999 to 2000. At the time of his death in 2019 he was teaching a course on technology, terrorism and national security law at George Mason University.

In 2007, when patient conditions at Walter Reed Army Medical Center had become a national concern, Marsh and former Secretary of the Army Togo West were appointed by Secretary of Defense Robert Gates to an independent review panel tasked to investigate medical and leadership failures. Among the panel's many recommendations was to close the aging facility and relocate medical services to what was then the National Naval Medical Center located in Bethesda, Maryland.

Marsh was also a member of the Markle Foundation. The John O. Marsh Institute for Government and Public Policy at Shenandoah University is named for him.

== Personal life ==
Marsh lived in his hometown of Winchester, Virginia, with his wife; they had three children and seven grandchildren. His son, John "Rob", served as a U.S. Army surgeon during the 1993 Battle of Mogadishu and received the Legion of Merit, two Bronze Stars, Purple Heart, the Defense Meritorious Service Medal and the Army Meritorious Service Medal.

Marsh Jr. died on February 4, 2019, of complications from congestive heart failure in Raphine, Virginia, at the age of 92.

U.S. House of Representatives
Preceded by Burr Harrison	Member of the U.S. House of Representatives from Virginia's 7th congressional district 1963–1971	Succeeded by Kenneth Robinson
Political offices
Preceded by Rady A. Johnson	Assistant Secretary of Defense for Legislative Affairs; 1973–1974	Succeeded by John M. Maury
Preceded by Anne Armstrong	Counselor to the President; 1974–1977; Served alongside: Robert T. Hartmann, Rogers Morton	Succeeded by Ed Meese (1981)
Preceded by Dean Burch	Counselor to the President; 1974–1977; Served alongside: Robert T. Hartmann, Rogers Morton	Succeeded by Ed Meese (1981)
Preceded by Kenneth Rush	Counselor to the President; 1974–1977; Served alongside: Robert T. Hartmann, Rogers Morton	Succeeded by Ed Meese (1981)
Preceded by Percy Pierre (Acting)	United States Secretary of the Army; 1981–1989	Succeeded by Michael P. W. Stone
