= Arthur K. Watson =

American businessman and diplomat (1919–1974)

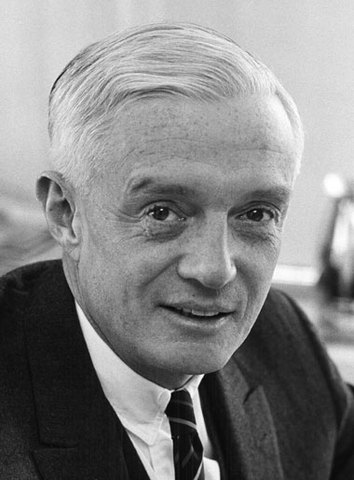

21st United States Ambassador to France
- In office May 6, 1970 – October 30, 1972
- President: Richard Nixon
- Preceded by: Sargent Shriver
- Succeeded by: John N. Irwin II

Personal details
- Born: Arthur Kittredge Watson; April 23, 1919 Summit, New Jersey, U.S.
- Died: July 26, 1974 (aged 55) Norwalk, Connecticut, U.S.
- Relatives: Thomas J. Watson (father); Thomas J. Watson Jr. (brother); Ann Hemingway Watson Symington (spouse)
- Education: Yale University

Arthur Kittredge "Dick" Watson (April 23, 1919 – July 26, 1974) was an American businessman and diplomat. He served as president of IBM World Trade Corporation and United States Ambassador to France. His father, Thomas J. Watson, was IBM's founder and oversaw that company's growth into an international force from the 1920s to the 1950s. His brother Thomas J. Watson Jr. was the president of IBM from 1952 to 1971 and United States Ambassador to the Soviet Union.

== Early life ==
Arthur K. Watson—known as "Dick" by his friends and colleagues—was born in Summit, New Jersey. He attended The Hotchkiss School and Yale University.

Watson was a benefactor of the Metropolitan Museum of Art, serving as a trustee of the Museum and as a member of the Museum's Centennial committee.

Watson was the Ambassador to France during the 1972 visit by Richard Nixon to China. Watson's meetings with his Chinese counterpart Huang Zhen in Paris helped to begin normalization of diplomatic relations before the countries had direct ambassadors.

Arthur K. Watson died as a result of a fall on July 26, 1974, in New Canaan, Connecticut, at age 55. Yale University's computer science building is named in his honor.

== Sources ==
- www-03.ibm.com

Diplomatic posts
Preceded by Sargent Shriver	U.S. Ambassador to France; 1970–1972	Succeeded by John N. Irwin II
