= Derek Guy =

Canadian menswear writer (born 1979)

- Born: January 7, 1979 (age 47); Vancouver, British Columbia, Canada
- Other names: "the menswear guy"; "dieworkwear"
- Education: University of California, Berkeley (graduate studies in political science)
- Years active: 2011–present
- Website: dieworkwear.com

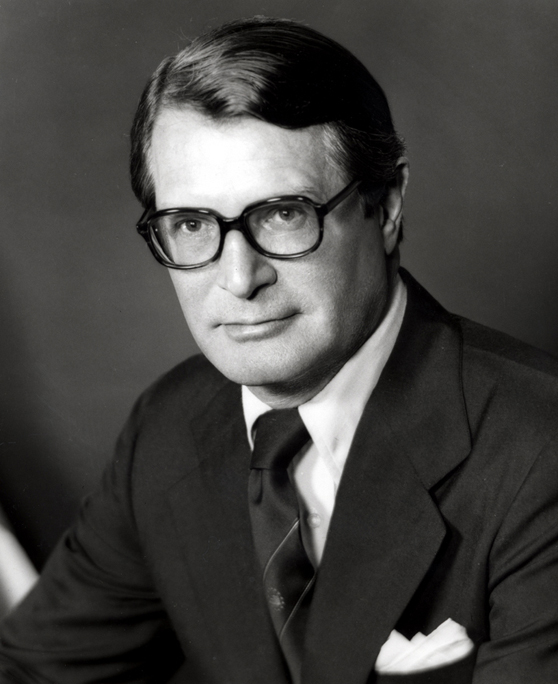
Guy's avatar depicts Elliot Richardson, described by him as "one of the best-dressed men in American politics ever"

Derek Guy (born January 7, 1979), also known as "the menswear guy" on Twitter, is a Canadian-American men's fashion industry writer and commentator.

== Early life ==
Guy was born in Vancouver to Vietnamese refugee parents. (Note: Attributed to multiple sources:) His family first fled Saigon in the late 1960s, crossing the border to Cambodia. From there they went to Iran and Canada, before settling in the United States, with his father overstaying his visa. Guy's father, who is ethnically Chinese, worked as a school janitor while his mother was a secretary.

As a teenager in Southern California in the 1990s, he edited an underground hip-hop magazine, Subculture, that at its peak boasted a circulation of 65,000. He became interested in fashion in the late 1990s, after growing up around people involved in the Lo Life subculture, which revolves around an appreciation of Polo Ralph Lauren and other similar fashion brands.

In December 2012, he was described as a "graduate student studying the political economy of oil countries," and in September 2016, a "graduate student in political science at the University of California, Berkeley."

== Career ==
Guy began writing about clothing around 2011, maintaining a Tumblr blog and writing for the website PutThisOn.

He gained fame following the acquisition of Twitter by Elon Musk when the site's algorithmically curated "For You" tab promoted his account @dieworkwear to a large audience. Guy has contributed pieces to publications including GQ, The Washington Post, Esquire, Foreign Policy, Politico, The Guardian, and The Nation. He is listed on the Business of Fashion 500, "the definitive index of people shaping the global fashion industry."

In 2025 a post he made sharing his family's undocumented immigration story went viral and received interaction from the official accounts of JD Vance and the Department of Homeland Security; both accounts posted memes in response to Guy.

== Personal life ==
Guy lives in the San Francisco Bay Area. He has cited author G. Bruce Boyer as an influence on his writing.

He is described as "oddly private" and is never photographed, maintaining a high level of anonymity despite his online fame.
