= Counselor to the President =

American political position

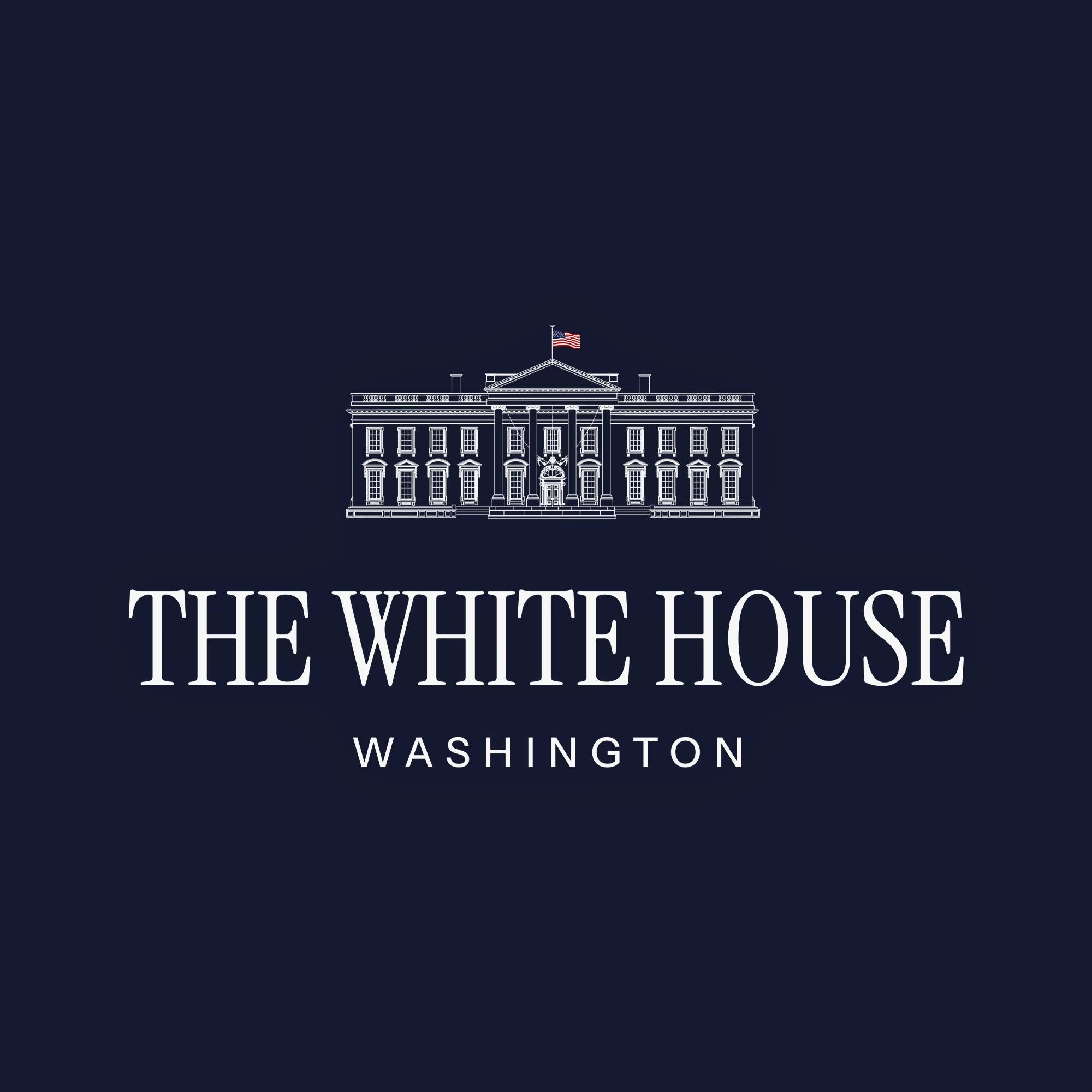

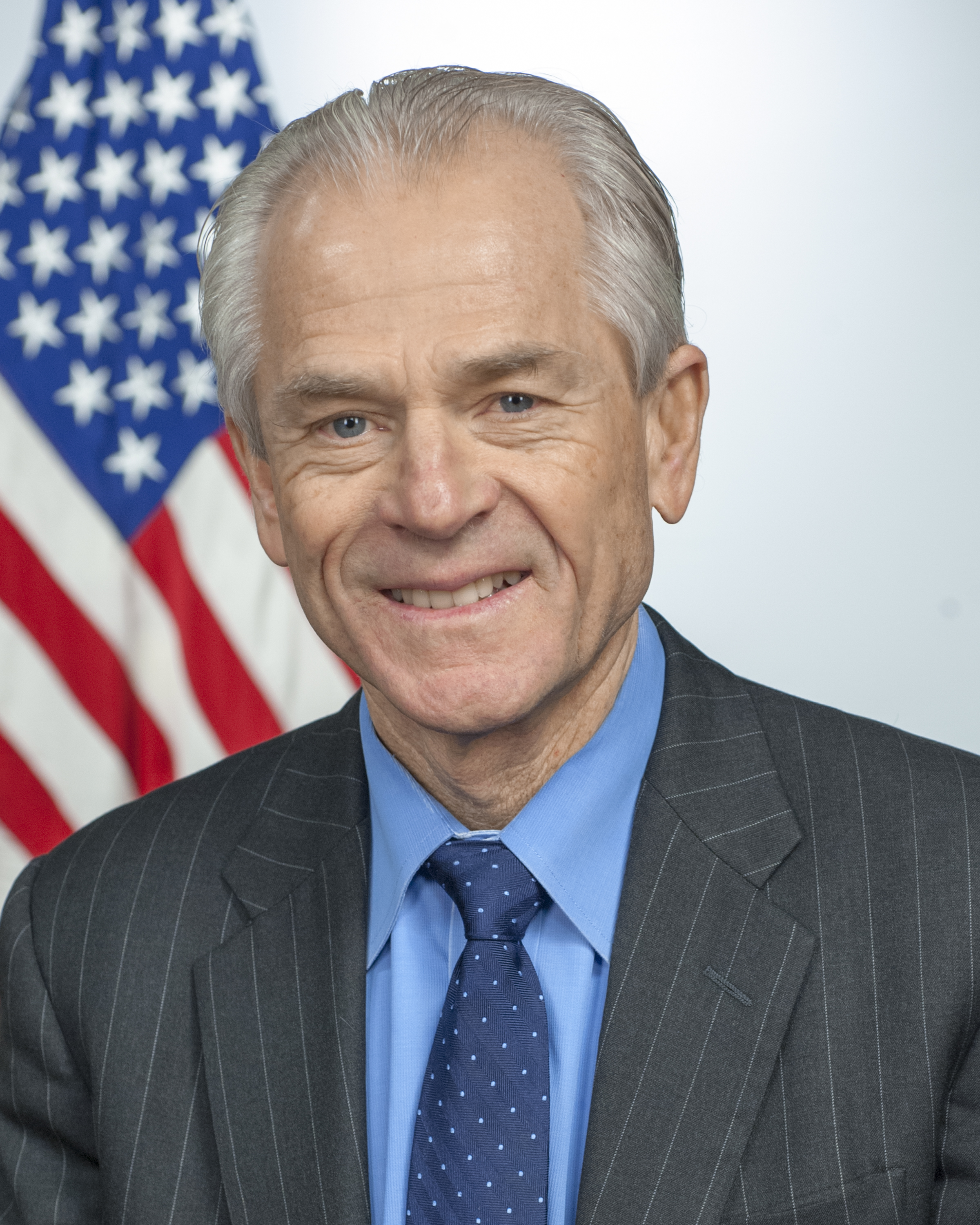
- Incumbent; Peter Navarro since January 20, 2025
- Executive Office of the President; White House Office
- Reports to: President of the United States
- Appointer: President of the United States
- Formation: January 20, 1969; 57 years ago
- First holder: Arthur F. Burns
- Website: The White House

Counselor to the President is a title used by high-ranking political advisors to the president of the United States and senior members of the White House Office.

The current officeholder is Peter Navarro. The position should not be confused with that of White House counsel, who is an appointed chief legal advisor to the president and the White House.

== History ==
The position was created during the administration of Richard Nixon, where it was assigned cabinet rank. It remained a cabinet-level position until 1993.

During Nixon's presidency, eight people held the position, with there sometimes being two or three concurrent incumbents.

During the presidency of Gerald Ford, the post was shared by longtime communications advisor Robert T. Hartmann and national security aide John O. Marsh, with former United States secretary of commerce Rogers Morton briefly joining them as a domestic policy advisor in early 1976.

The position was vacant during the Jimmy Carter administration, as Carter initially left many senior White House positions unfilled (such as White House chief of staff) and preferred a smaller corps of advisors.

Edwin Meese held the position during the first term of President Ronald Reagan, and was highly influential inside the White House. Meese, Chief of Staff James Baker and Deputy Chief of Staff Michael Deaver were nicknamed "the troika" and considered the most influential advisors to the president. Meese became United States attorney general during Reagan's second term as president and the position was left vacant.

The position was left vacant in the first three years of President George H. W. Bush's term. In 1992, it was filled by Clayton Yeutter following his resignation as chairman of the Republican National Committee.

During the Bill Clinton administration, the post became much more focused on communications. Two of Clinton's counselors, David Gergen and Paul Begala, later became CNN political analysts.

During the administration of George W. Bush, the position oversaw the communications, media affairs, speechwriting, and press offices.

Under the Obama administration, the position was initially abolished and the duties of the office transferred to three senior advisors: David Axelrod, Pete Rouse, and Valerie Jarrett, who also held the title Assistant to the President for Intergovernmental Relations and Public Liaison. On January 6, 2011, President Obama appointed Rouse as counselor to the president where he was responsible for assisting the president and chief of staff with the day-to-day management of White House staff operations. John Podesta was the last person to hold the position before he left to join the Hillary Clinton presidential campaign of 2016 as chairman.

Soon after the 2016 election, President-elect Donald Trump announced his intention to name his campaign manager during the general election, Kellyanne Conway, to the position and his campaign CEO Steve Bannon as a senior counselor and chief strategist. With equivalent standing to the chief of staff and a portfolio that hewed closely to the pre-Clinton iteration of the position, Bannon was named to the Principals Committee of the National Security Council in a January 2017 executive order that also removed the director of national intelligence and the chairman of the Joint Chiefs of Staff from the committee. Following vociferous public opposition to the decision, Trump removed Bannon from the council in April 2017.

After Bannon's departure from the White House in August 2017, Johnny DeStefano was appointed to the job in February 2018, with responsibility for overseeing the offices of presidential personnel, political affairs, and public liaison.

In February 2020, it was announced that former White House communications director Hope Hicks would return to the White House Office in the role. In May 2020, White House staff secretary Derek Lyons was also given the title of counselor.

President Joe Biden named Steve Ricchetti, the chairman of his 2020 presidential campaign, as counselor to the president upon taking office. Jeffrey Zients was also given the title in his role as White House coronavirus response coordinator.

== List of counselors to the president ==
Counselors to the President were Cabinet-level officials under Richard Nixon, Gerald Ford, Ronald Reagan, and George H. W. Bush. Jimmy Carter did not name any White House staff as counselor.

Name		Start	End	Portfolio	Party	Appointer	Ref(s)
Arthur Burns	Arthur F. Burns (1904–1987)	January 20, 1969	November 5, 1969	Domestic Policy	Republican	Richard Nixon (1969–1974)	
Bryce Harlow	Bryce Harlow (1916–1987)	November 5, 1969	December 9, 1970	Legislative and Congressional Affairs	Republican	Richard Nixon (1969–1974)	
Pat Moynihan	Pat Moynihan (1927–2003)	November 5, 1969	December 31, 1970	Family Assistance Plan	Democratic	Richard Nixon (1969–1974)	
Robert Finch	Robert Finch (1925–1995)	June 23, 1970	December 15, 1972		Republican	Richard Nixon (1969–1974)	
Donald Rumsfeld	Donald Rumsfeld (1932–2021)	December 11, 1970	October 15, 1971	Economic Policy and Advisement	Republican	Richard Nixon (1969–1974)	
Anne Armstrong	Anne Armstrong (1927–2008)	January 19, 1973	December 18, 1974	Women's Programs	Republican	Richard Nixon (1969–1974)	
	Dean Burch (1927–1991)	March 8, 1974	December 31, 1974		Republican	Richard Nixon (1969–1974)	
Kenneth Rush	Kenneth Rush (1910–1994)	May 29, 1974	September 19, 1974	Economic Policy	Republican	Richard Nixon (1969–1974)	
	Bob Hartmann (1917–2008)	August 9, 1974	January 20, 1977	Presidential Speeches, Statements, Messages and Correspondences	Republican	Gerald Ford (1974–1977)	
John O. Marsh	John Marsh (1926–2019)	August 9, 1974	January 20, 1977		Democratic	Gerald Ford (1974–1977)	
	Rogers Morton (1914–1979)	February 2, 1976	April 1, 1976	Domestic and Economic Policy	Republican	Gerald Ford (1974–1977)	
Edwin Meese	Edwin Meese (born 1931)	January 20, 1981	February 25, 1985	Domestic Policy; National Security Council	Republican	Ronald Reagan (1981–1989)	
Clayton Yeutter	Clayton Yeutter (1930–2017)	February 1, 1992	January 20, 1993	Domestic Policy	Republican	George H. Bush (1989–1993)	
David Gergen	David Gergen (1942–2025)	May 29, 1993	June 10, 1994	Foreign Affairs	Republican	Bill Clinton (1993–2001)	
Mack McLarty	Mack McLarty (born 1946)	July 17, 1994	June 30, 1998	National Economic Council; Special Envoy to the Americas	Democratic	Bill Clinton (1993–2001)	
	Bill Curry (born 1951)	February 21, 1995	January 20, 1997	Domestic Strategy	Democratic	Bill Clinton (1993–2001)	
Paul Begala	Paul Begala (born 1961)	August 17, 1997	March 10, 1999	Policy, Politics, and Communications	Democratic	Bill Clinton (1993–2001)	
	Ann Lewis (born 1937)	March 10, 1999	January 20, 2001	Communications	Democratic	Bill Clinton (1993–2001)	
Karen Hughes	Karen Hughes (born 1956)	January 20, 2001	July 8, 2002	Communications, Media Affairs, Speechwriting, and Press	Republican	George W. Bush (2001–2009)	
Dan Bartlett	Dan Bartlett (born 1971)	January 5, 2005	July 5, 2007	Strategic Communication and Policy	Republican	George W. Bush (2001–2009)	
Ed Gillespie	Ed Gillespie (born 1961)	July 5, 2007	January 20, 2009	Policy Development and Strategic Planning	Republican	George W. Bush (2001–2009)	
Pete Rouse	Pete Rouse (born 1946)	January 13, 2011	January 1, 2014	Legislative Affairs	Democratic	Barack Obama (2009–2017)	
JohnPodesta	John Podesta (born 1949)	January 1, 2014	February 13, 2015	Climate and Energy	Democratic	Barack Obama (2009–2017)	
Steve Bannon	Steve Bannon (born 1953)	January 20, 2017	August 18, 2017	Political Strategy (as Chief Strategist and Senior Counselor)	Republican	Donald Trump (2017–2021)	
Kellyanne Conway	Kellyanne Conway (born 1967)	January 20, 2017	August 31, 2020	Political and Polling Strategy (as Senior Counselor)	Republican	Donald Trump (2017–2021)	
Johnny DeStefano	Johnny DeStefano (born 1979)	February 9, 2018	May 24, 2019	Intergovernmental Affairs and Political Affairs	Republican	Donald Trump (2017–2021)	
Hope Hicks	Hope Hicks (born 1988)	March 9, 2020	January 12, 2021	Strategic Communications	Republican	Donald Trump (2017–2021)	
Derek Lyons	Derek Lyons	May 20, 2020	January 20, 2021	Domestic Policy	Republican	Donald Trump (2017–2021)	
Steve Ricchetti	Steve Ricchetti (born c. 1957)	January 20, 2021	January 20, 2025	Legislative and Governmental Relations	Democratic	Joe Biden (2021–2025)	
Jeff Zients	Jeff Zients (born 1966)	January 20, 2021	April 4, 2022	COVID Response Coordination	Democratic	Joe Biden (2021–2025)	
	Alina Habba (born 1984)	January 20, 2025	March 24, 2025	Senior Counselor	Republican	Donald Trump (2025–present)	
	Peter Navarro (born 1949)	January 20, 2025	present	Trade and Manufacturing (as Senior Counselor)	Republican	Donald Trump (2025–present)	
	Stanley Woodward (born 1983)	January 20, 2025	November 14, 2025	Senior Counselor	Republican	Donald Trump (2025–present)	

== Gallery ==
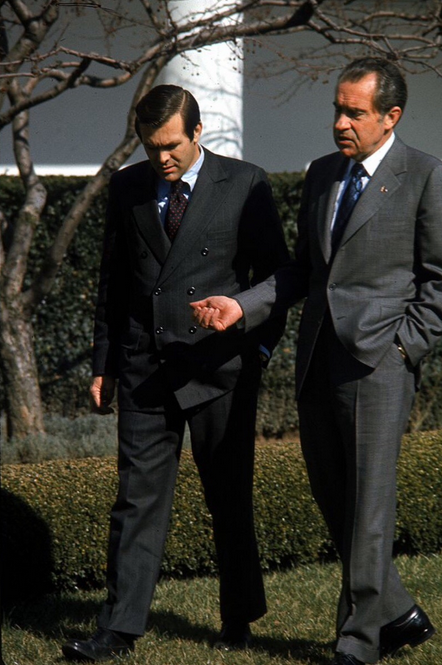
Counselor to the President Donald Rumsfeld confers with President Richard Nixon on the White House grounds

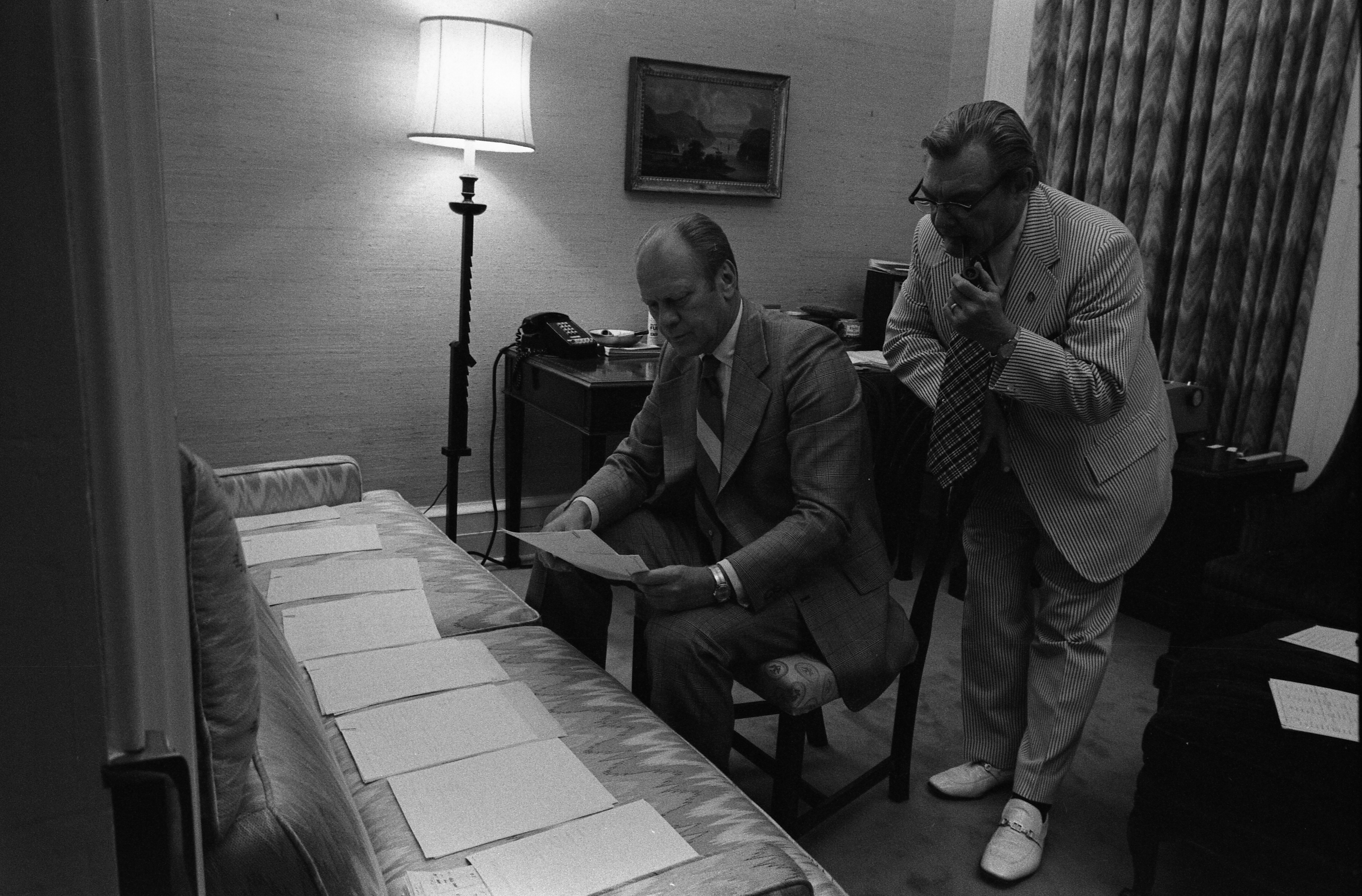
President Ford and Counselor Robert T. Hartmann looking over paperwork concerning the selection of a new vice president, 1974

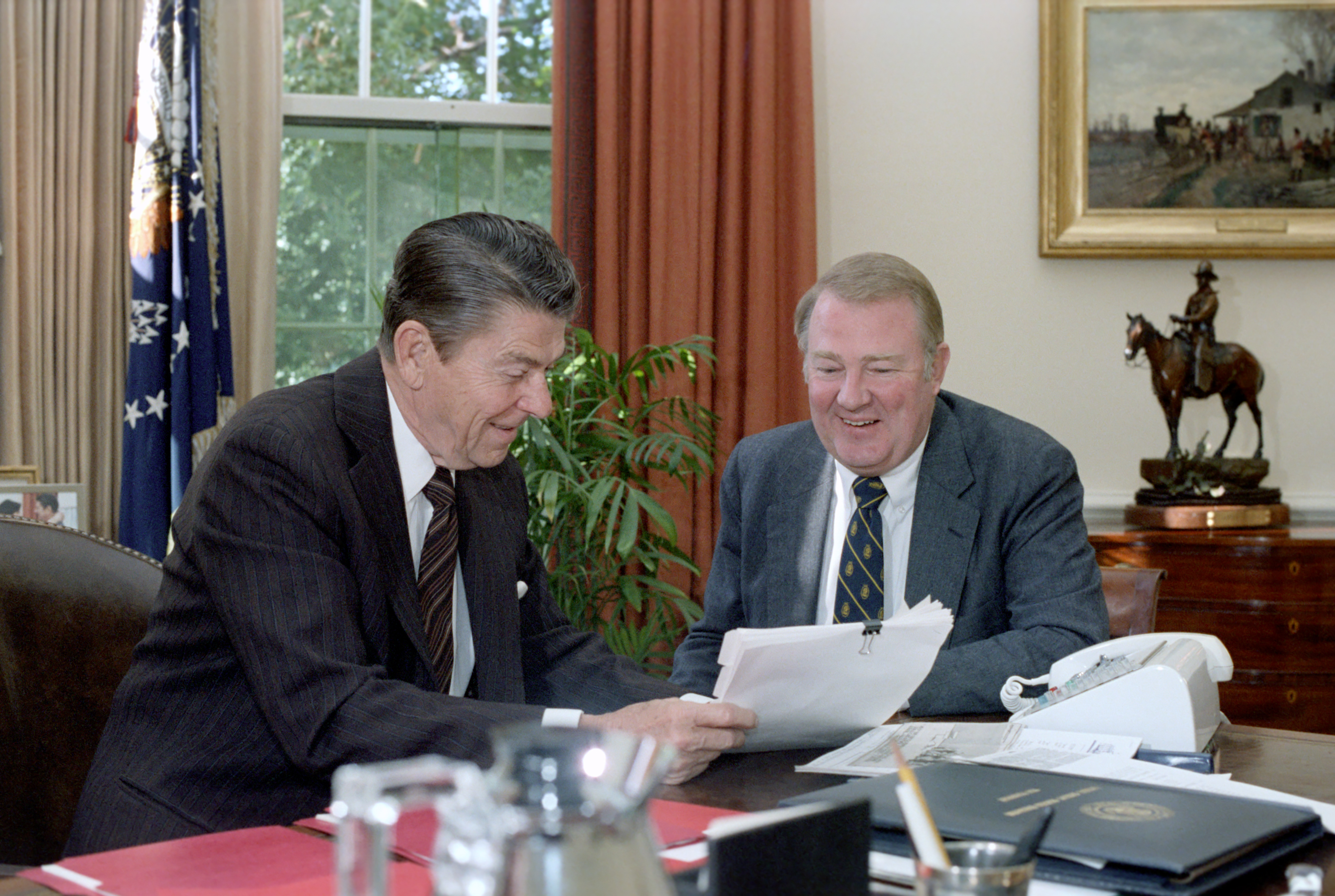
President Reagan meeting with Counselor Edwin Meese in the Oval Office

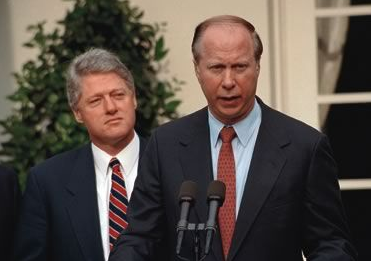
Bill Clinton announces the appointment of David Gergen as Counselor to the President, 1993

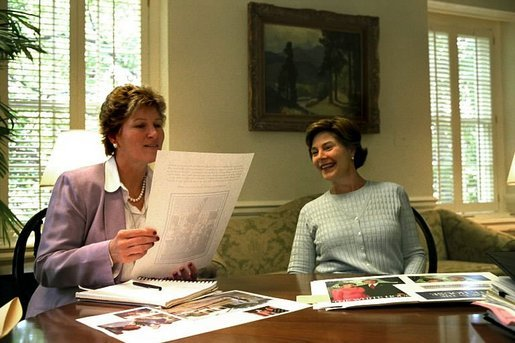
Counselor to the President Karen Hughes and First Lady Laura Bush, June 28, 2002

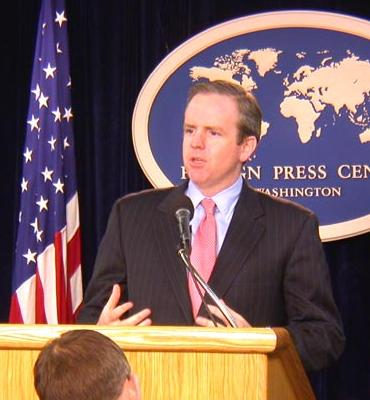
Counselor to the President Dan Bartlett delivering a briefing on President George W. Bush's State of the Union Message, February 3, 2005

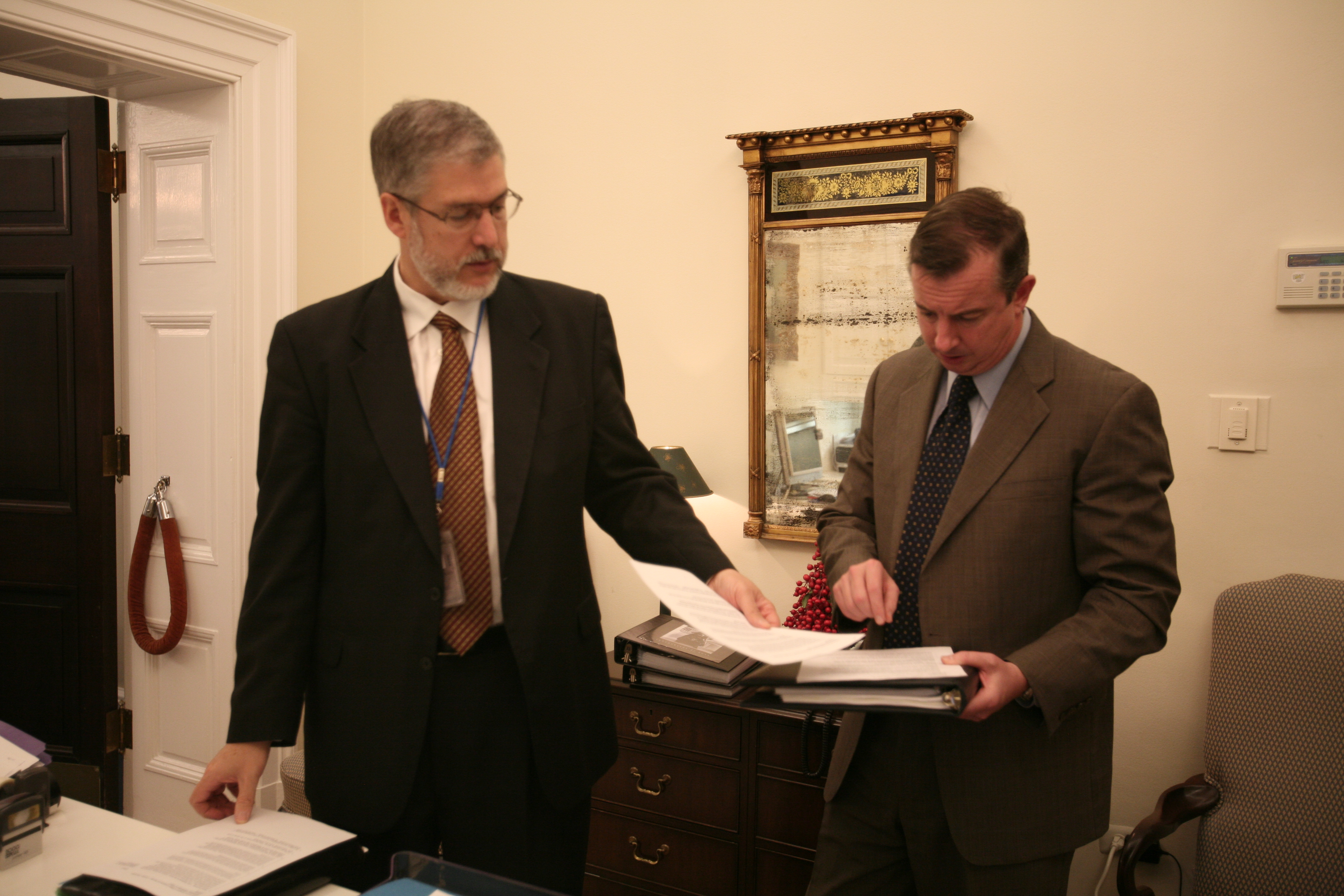
Counselor to the President Ed Gillespie (right) and Chief of Staff to the Vice President David Addington review a document, December 5, 2007

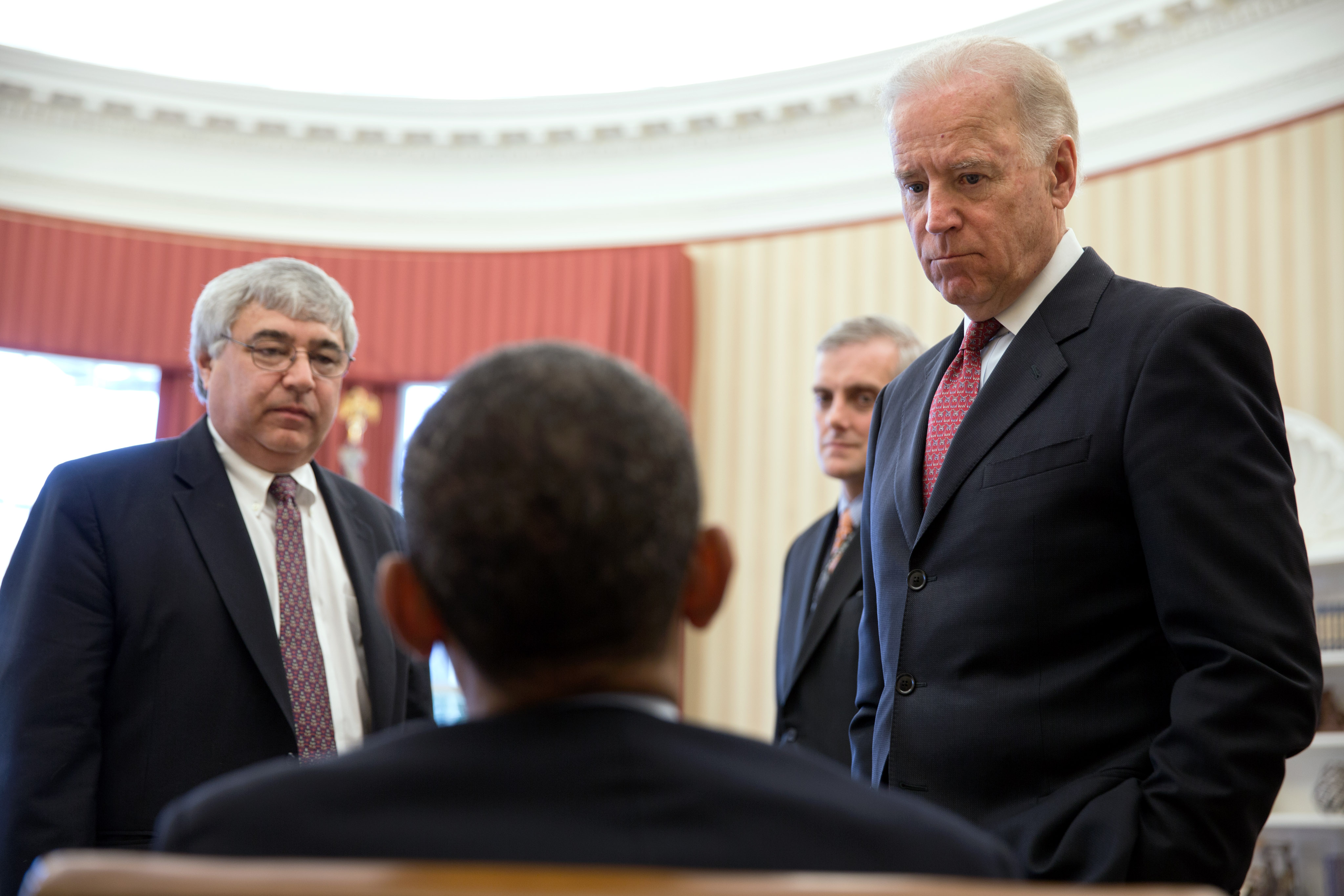
Counselor to the President Pete Rouse, White House Chief of Staff Denis McDonough and Vice President Joe Biden talk with President Barack Obama, April 2, 2013

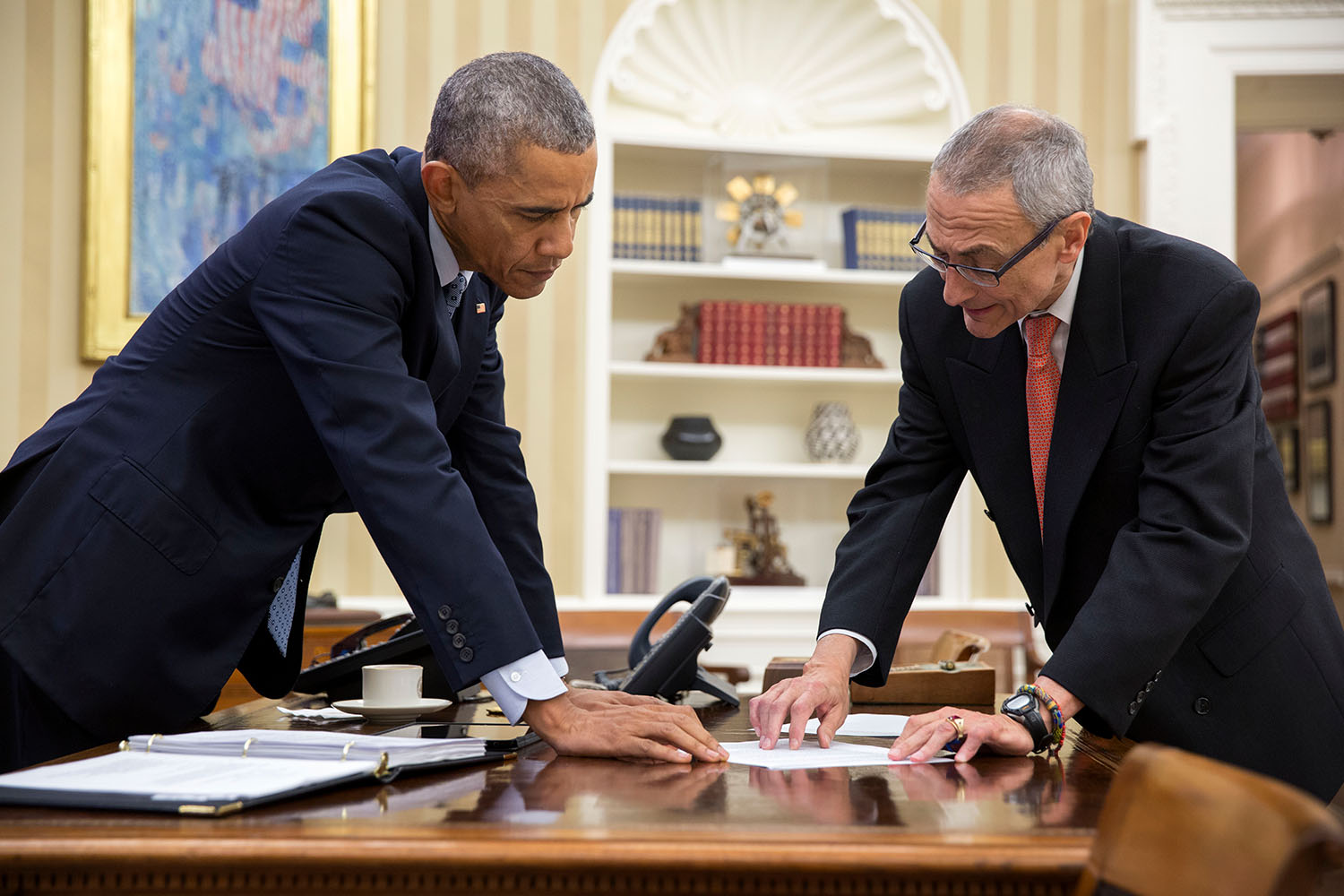
Counselor to the President John Podesta meets with President Obama in the Oval Office, January 29, 2015

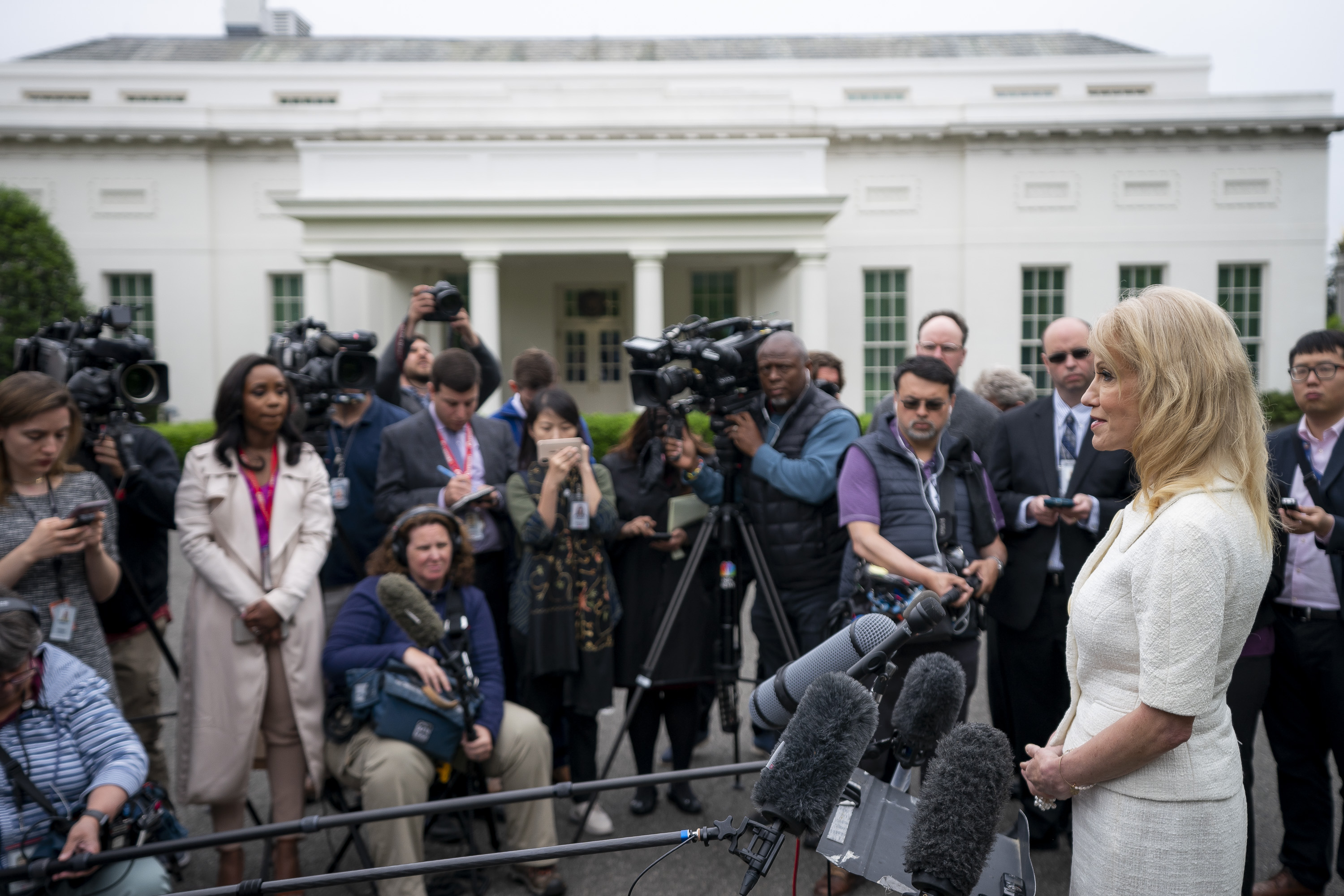
Counselor to the President Kellyanne Conway talks to reporters and answers questions outside the West Wing entrance of the White House

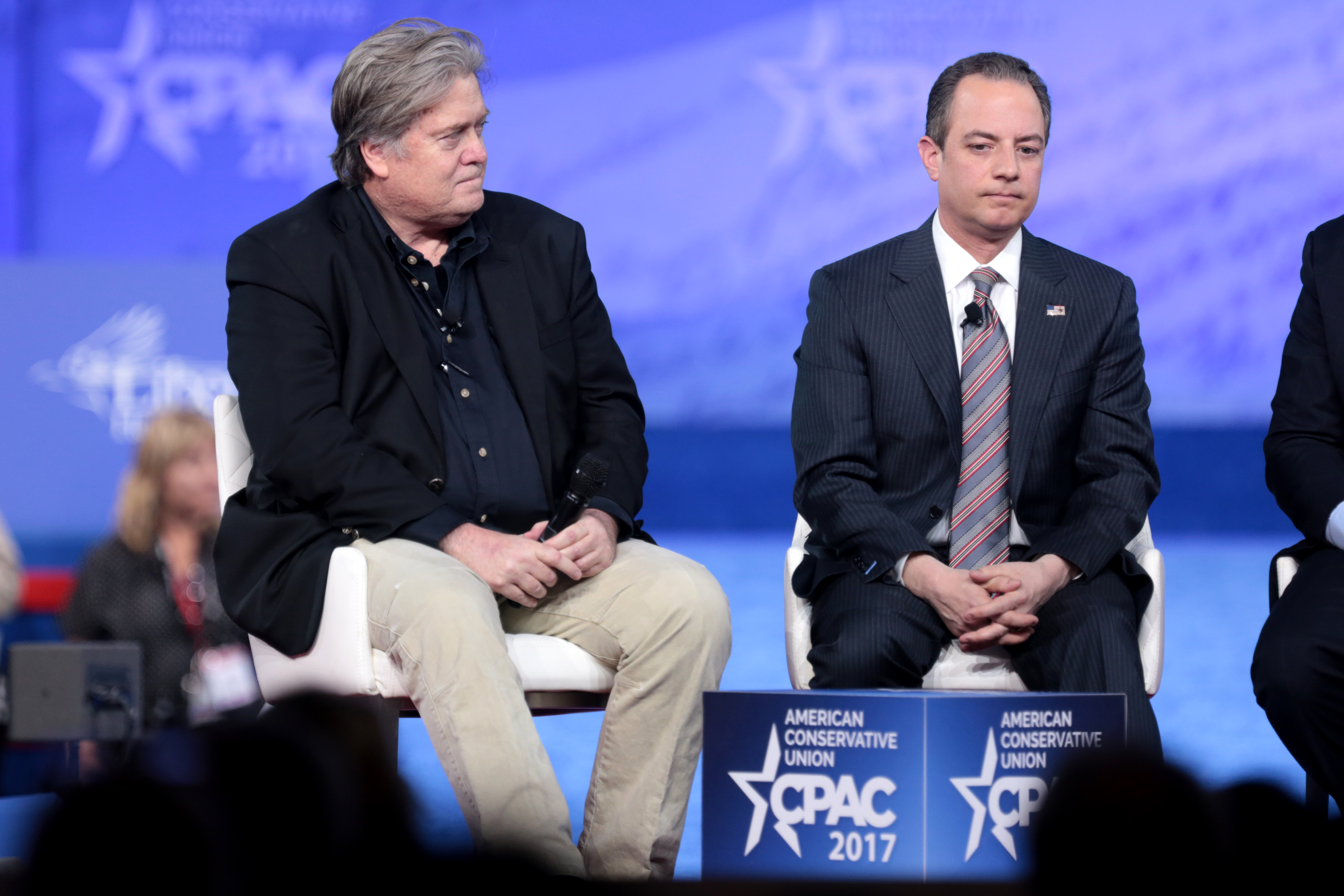
Senior Counselor to the President Steve Bannon appears with White House Chief of Staff Reince Priebus at the 2017 Conservative Political Action Conference

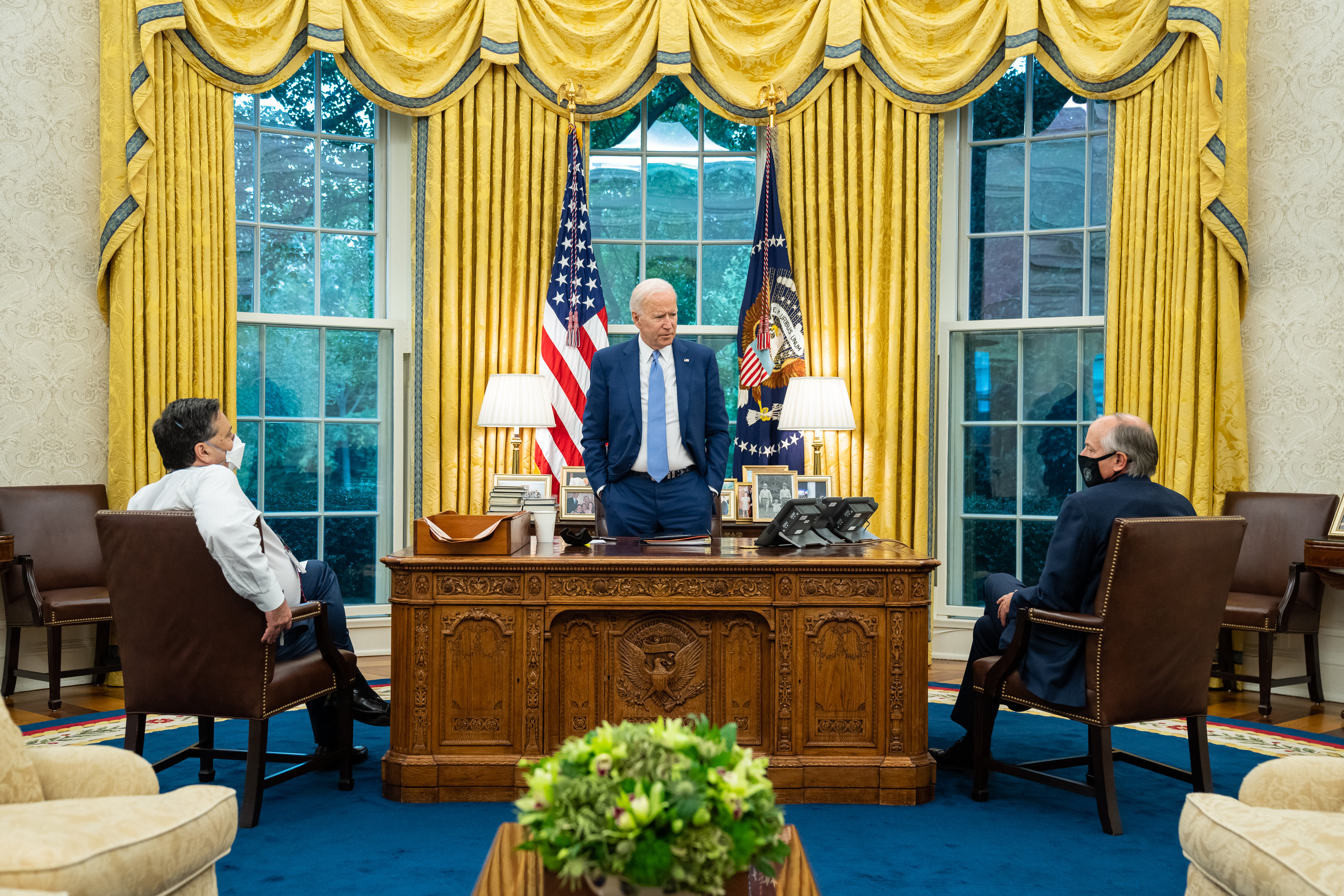
Counselor to the President Steve Ricchetti (right) meets with White House Chief of Staff Ron Klain and President Joe Biden in the Oval Office, October 2021

== See also ==
- Senior Advisor to the President of the United States
- White House Counsel
