= The Metropolitan Museum of Art Centennial =

The Metropolitan Museum of Art Centennial was a series of events and initiatives celebrating the 100th anniversary of the charter of the Museum occurring between 1969 and 1971.

== Background ==
The Metropolitan Museum of Art celebrated its centennial with exhibitions, symposia, concerts, lectures, the reopening of refurbished galleries, special tours, social events, and other programming for eighteen months from October 1969 through the spring of 1971. The highlight was an open house and Centennial Ball on April 13, 1970. The anniversary was organized by The Metropolitan Museum of Art's 100th Anniversary Committee, chaired by Trustee Roswell Gilpatric and including Museum President Arthur A. Houghton, Trustees Brooke Astor, C. Douglas Dillon, and Arthur K. Watson, advertising executive David Ogilvy, CBS President Frank Stanton, socialite and representative to the United Nations Commission on Human Rights Marietta Tree, and collector and future Museum Trustee Jayne Wrightsman. Events were held both at the Museum and beyond, reaching cities throughout the United States and overseas.

"The Great Age of Fresco: Giotto to Pontormo," which was on view for only two months in the fall of 1968, was the first exhibition at the Museum to have corporate sponsorship. Olivetti’s underwriting of the exhibition was seen as a model for the pursuit of corporate sponsors for the Centennial exhibitions being planned at that time.

== Exhibitions ==
Centennial special events at the Museum centered around five exhibitions celebrating the breadth of the Museum’s collecting over the previous one hundred years: "New York Painting and Sculpture: 1940–1970" (sponsored by Xerox), "The Year 1200,""19th-Century America" (opened by First Lady Pat Nixon), "Before Cortés: Sculpture of Middle America," and "Masterpieces of Seven Centuries." "New York Painting and Sculpture: 1940–1970" was the Museum's first exhibition of contemporary American art, curated by Henry Geldzahler to mark the inauguration of the newly established department of Contemporary Arts. It elicited reactions ranging from shock to relief at the new direction of collecting that it signaled. For each exhibition, a contemporary American composer was commissioned to create an orchestral fanfare. These included Shivaree by Leonard Bernstein (for "Before Cortes: Sculpture of Middle America"), Ceremonial Fanfare For Brass Ensemble by Aaron Copland (for "Masterpieces of Fifty Centuries"), Ceremonial Fanfare by Walter Piston (for "The Year 1200"), Anniversary Fanfare by William Schuman (for "19th Century America"), and Metropolitan Museum Fanfare: Portrait Of An American Artist by Virgil Thomson (for "New York Painting And Sculpture: 1940–1970").

As part of the Museum's expanded outreach programs, the Centennial was marked with loan exhibitions to museums in the United States and overseas, including Expo ’70 in Osaka, Japan. "Treasures from the Cloisters and the Metropolitan Museum of Art" traveled to the Los Angeles County Museum of Art and the Art Institute of Chicago. "Prints by Nine New York Painters" was seen in Jerusalem and seven other cities, while "Masterpieces of Painting in the Metropolitan Museum of Art" traveled to The Museum of Fine Arts, Boston, which celebrated its own centennial in 1970. Many objects shown in "Before Cortés: Sculpture of Middle America" originated from Mexico's Instituto Nacional de Antropologia y Historia as part of a 25-year reciprocal loan and cultural program with the Metropolitan Museum.

== Events ==
April 13, 1970 marked the 100th anniversary of the granting of the Metropolitan Museum's charter by the State of New York. On April 10 the Museum hosted a reception for staff members, before which Director Thomas Hoving presented the Museum's "Comprehensive Plan for the Second Century," which would guide building and program efforts in the coming decades. On April 13, the Museum held an open house for New York residents from 10 a.m. to 5 p.m., including a receiving line of political dignitaries, special programs, refreshments, and entertainment in the Museum and on its Fifth Avenue plaza. The Centennial Ball that evening was hosted by Museum trustee Brooke Astor and featured reduced ticket prices for staff members and their families. Four ballrooms were set up in the Museum, each decorated by a noted New York interior decorator around the theme of a specific historical event or artistic period.

== Publications and centennial initiatives ==
In celebration of the Centennial the Museum published eighteen new books, twelve directly related to the anniversary and six to other aspects of its collections. Among them were Merchants and Masterpieces: The Story of the Metropolitan Museum of Art, written by New Yorker staff writer Calvin Tomkins and published in 1970, which serves as an official history of the institution, and a centennial issue of the Metropolitan Museum Journal published to coincide with the celebrations’ conclusion in 1971. Other initiatives included educational programs, book publishing, television programs, film projects, and receptions to coincide with meetings of professional organizations including the American Association of Museums.

"Cinémathèque at the Metropolitan Museum," which was jointly sponsored by the Museum and City Center of Music and Drama, showed seventy films dating from the medium's first seventy-five years on thirty-five consecutive evenings from July 29 to September 3, 1970. The films were selected by Cinémathèque Française founder and director Henri Langlois, from its archive of more than 50,000 films. Chosen for their significance and contributions to the history of filmmaking, they included work from official film industries as well as current and early avant garde directors. The program was the most diverse film exhibition held in the United States to date, and was the Museum's first major undertaking in film. Television projects associated with the centennial included "Masterpieces of Fifty Centuries" narrated by noted art historian Sir Kenneth Clark, a one-hour NBC program prepared by Aline Saarinen, and a network television report each evening during the week of October 6, 1969 on one of the five centerpiece centennial exhibitions.

Specially tailored Museum visits were organized for members of other museums and cultural organizations across the United States to see the Centennial exhibits and participate in related programming. An intensive advertising, promotion, and public relations campaign publicized the events to a wide range of visitors and distant supporters through newspapers, magazines, and other print publications, as well as television and local store window displays. A free year-long course in art history, composed of thirty lectures, was developed and offered to the public by the Education Department. Artist Frank Stella was commissioned to create a Centennial logo, and medals incorporating the design were struck to mark the occasion. Remodeled and refurbished galleries in the Museum opened during this period, including the Ancient Near Eastern Art and Egyptian Art departments and the Costume Institute in the fall of 1970, and a reinstallation of the Musical Instruments collections. The extent of air-conditioned gallery space was doubled, to include almost two-thirds of the Museum's exhibition spaces. Considerable emphasis was also put on fundraising for the expenses associated with the Centennial celebrations.
