= Anne L. Armstrong =

American diplomat (1927–2008)

Anne Armstrong
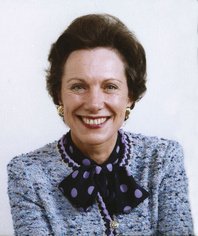

Chair of the President's Intelligence Advisory Board
- In office October 20, 1981 – July 17, 1990
- President: Ronald Reagan; George H. W. Bush
- Preceded by: Leo Cherne
- Succeeded by: John Tower

United States Ambassador to the United Kingdom
- In office March 17, 1976 – March 3, 1977
- President: Gerald Ford; Jimmy Carter
- Preceded by: Elliot Richardson
- Succeeded by: Kingman Brewster

Counselor to the President
- In office January 19, 1973 – December 18, 1974; Serving with Dean Burch, Kenneth Rush
- President: Richard Nixon; Gerald Ford
- Preceded by: Robert Finch
- Succeeded by: Robert T. Hartmann; John O. Marsh

Personal details
- Born: December 27, 1927 New Orleans, Louisiana, U.S.
- Died: July 30, 2008 (aged 80) Houston, Texas, U.S.
- Party: Republican
- Spouse: Tobin Armstrong
- Children: 5
- Education: Vassar College (AB)

Anne Legendre Armstrong (December 27, 1927 – July 30, 2008) was a United States diplomat and politician. She was the first woman to serve as Counselor to the President and as United States Ambassador to the United Kingdom, serving in those capacities under the Nixon, Ford, and Carter administrations. She was the recipient of the Presidential Medal of Freedom in 1987.

== Personal life ==
Armstrong was born on December 27, 1927, in New Orleans, Louisiana, and graduated from Vassar College in 1949. In 1950, she married Tobin Armstrong, a cattle rancher from Texas.

== Political career ==
From 1966 to 1968, she was the vice chairman of the Texas Republican Party. From 1971 to 1973, she was co-chairman of the Republican National Committee, and she was the keynote speaker at the 1972 Republican National Convention. Armstrong was the first woman from either major party to keynote at a national convention. In a Christmas dinner toast at the White House on Dec. 16, 1972, she "in one breath" praised "'Jesus Christ, the Prince of Peace'" and Nixon as "the man who has done the most for peace in our history"; at the time, Nixon had given orders for the Christmas Bombing of North Vietnam.

== Counselor to the President ==
President Richard Nixon named Armstrong as Counselor to the President on December 19, 1972. She held from January 19, 1973, to November 1974 under President Ford.

During her tenure as Counselor, Armstrong founded the first Office of Women's Programs in the White House, predecessor to the current White House Council on Women and Girls. Fluent in Spanish, she was Nixon's liaison to Hispanic Americans and was a member of a Cabinet committee on opportunities for Spanish-speaking people. From 1976 to 1977, Armstrong was the first woman United States Ambassador to the United Kingdom.

== Consideration for the vice presidency ==
At the 1976 Republican National Convention in Kansas City, Missouri, there was a draft effort to put Armstrong on the ticket as the vice presidential nominee with incumbent President Gerald Ford. Senator Robert Dole of Kansas was instead chosen by Ford. In 1978, Armstrong supported George W. Bush in his successful primary challenge to Jim Reese in their congressional runoff primary in Texas's 19th congressional district.

== Support for the Equal Rights Amendment ==
Armstrong was a supporter of the Equal Rights Amendment (ERA). In 1971, Armstrong was quoted as saying, "I feel like it has become a symbol of meaning for so many people. Plus it would clear up a lot of legal questions."

== Awards and recognition ==
In 1987, Armstrong was given the Presidential Medal of Freedom by Ronald Reagan. In 1989, she received the Golden Plate Award of the American Academy of Achievement. She received an honorary Doctor of Laws from St. Mary's University in 1978.

== Death ==
Armstrong died of cancer in 2008. She is buried at Oakwood Cemetery, Austin, Texas.

Party political offices
Preceded by Daniel Evans	Keynote Speaker of the Republican National Convention; 1972	Succeeded by Howard Baker
Political offices
Preceded by Robert Finch	Counselor to the President; 1973–1974; Served alongside: Dean Burch, Kenneth Rush	Succeeded by Robert Hartmann
Preceded by Robert Finch	Counselor to the President; 1973–1974; Served alongside: Dean Burch, Kenneth Rush	Succeeded by John O. Marsh
Diplomatic posts
Preceded by Elliot Richardson	United States Ambassador to the United Kingdom; 1976–1977	Succeeded by Kingman Brewster
Government offices
Vacant Title last held by Leo Cherne	Chair of the President's Intelligence Advisory Board; 1981–1990	Succeeded by John Tower
