= John N. Irwin II =

American diplomat and attorney (1913-2000)

John N. Irwin
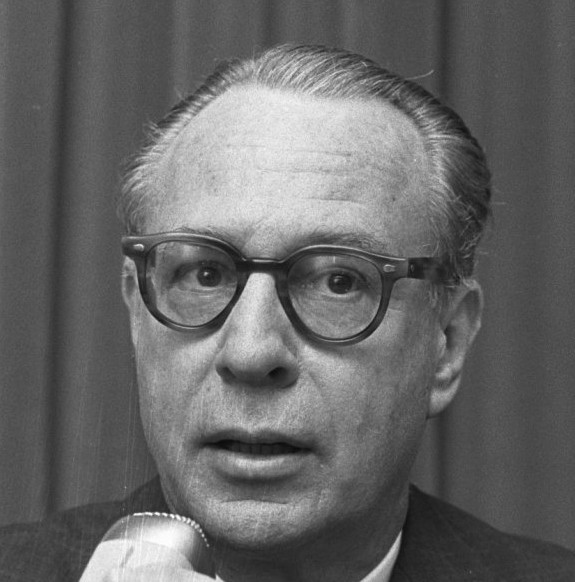

United States Ambassador to France
- In office March 23, 1973 – October 20, 1974
- President: Richard Nixon; Gerald Ford
- Preceded by: Arthur K. Watson
- Succeeded by: Kenneth Rush

1st United States Deputy Secretary of State
- In office July 12, 1972 – February 1, 1973
- President: Richard Nixon
- Preceded by: Position established
- Succeeded by: Kenneth Rush

26th United States Under Secretary of State
- In office September 21, 1970 – July 12, 1972
- President: Richard Nixon
- Preceded by: Elliot Richardson
- Succeeded by: Himself (as Deputy Secretary)

5th Assistant Secretary of Defense for International Security Affairs
- In office October 4, 1958 – January 20, 1961
- President: Dwight D. Eisenhower
- Preceded by: Mansfield D. Sprague
- Succeeded by: Paul Nitze

Personal details
- Born: John Nichol Irwin II; December 31, 1913 Keokuk, Iowa, U.S.
- Died: February 28, 2000 (aged 86) New Haven, Connecticut, U.S.
- Party: Republican
- Spouses: Jane Watson (m. 1940; died 1970) Jane Reimers (m. 1976)
- Children: John, Jane, Watkins (stepchild), Thomas (stepchild), Carl (stepchild)
- Education: Lawrenceville School; Princeton University; Oxford University; Fordham University
- Profession: Diplomat; Attorney

John Nichol Irwin II (December 31, 1913 – February 28, 2000) was an American diplomat and attorney during the Cold War. During World War II, he served in the Army in the Pacific as a member of General Douglas MacArthur's staff and reached the rank of lieutenant colonel.

== Biography ==
He was born on December 31, 1913, in Keokuk, Iowa. After graduating from the Fordham University School of Law, he became an attorney, eventually working as a lawyer at Patterson, Belknap & Webb.

He was the last person to hold the position of Under Secretary of State when that was the U.S. State Department's second-ranking office (1970-1972). In 1972, he became the first person to hold the office of Deputy Secretary of State, which succeeded the office of Under Secretary; he held that office until February 1, 1973.

In both capacities, his superior was Secretary William P. Rogers. Irwin resigned from the position of Deputy Secretary to serve as U.S. Ambassador to France.

In 1973, Irwin bought the Luis Maria Baca Grant No. 5, also known as the O RO Ranch, near Seligman, Arizona, from the Greene Cattle Company. In 1977, Irwin bought the Quien Sabe Ranch near Tres Pinos, California.

He died on February 28, 2000, in New Haven, Connecticut, at the age of 86.

Diplomatic posts
Preceded by Arthur K. Watson	United States Ambassador to France; 1973–1974	Succeeded by Kenneth Rush
