= Arthur Sohmer =

American attorney (1926–1991)

Assistant to the President Chief of Staff to the Vice President
- In office 1969–1973
- Vice President: Spiro Agnew
- Preceded by: Office created
- Succeeded by: Robert T. Hartmann

Personal details
- Born: February 16, 1926 Wilkes-Barre, Pennsylvania, U.S.
- Died: August 25, 1991 (aged 65) Woodstock, New York, U.S.
- Education: Lafayette College (BA); University of Maryland, Baltimore (JD)

Military service
- Branch/service: United States Navy
- Battles/wars: World War II

Arthur J. Sohmer (February 16, 1926 – August 25, 1991) was an American attorney and government official who served as Chief of Staff to the Vice President to Vice President Spiro Agnew from 1969 to 1973.

== Early life and education ==
Sohmer was born in Wilkes-Barre, Pennsylvania. He graduated from Lafayette College and the law school at the University of Maryland Francis King Carey School of Law.

== Career ==
Sohmer served in the United States Navy during World War II.

Sohmer moved to Baltimore, Maryland, in 1956. In 1962, he ran for a seat in the Maryland House of Delegates but lost in the primary. Later that year, he managed Spiro Agnew's successful campaign for Baltimore County executive. Agnew was the first Republican to win that office, a feat not repeated until 1990. Sohmer was appointed by Agnew to the Baltimore County Tax Appeals Court in 1963 and became its chief judge in 1964. Sohmer also managed Agnew's successful campaign for governor of Maryland in 1966. Sohmer then managed appointments in the Maryland governor's office.

After Agnew was elected vice president in 1968 on a ticket with Richard Nixon, Sohmer became his chief of staff. After Agnew's resignation in 1973, Sohmer held positions with the General Services Administration and the United States Railway Association.

In 1978, Sohmer was a founding partner in the Learning Tree, a mail-order company dealing in special education materials.

== Personal life ==
Sohmer died of lung cancer at his home in Woodstock, New York in 1991 at the age of 65.
