= Elliot Richardson =

American lawyer and politician (1920–1999)

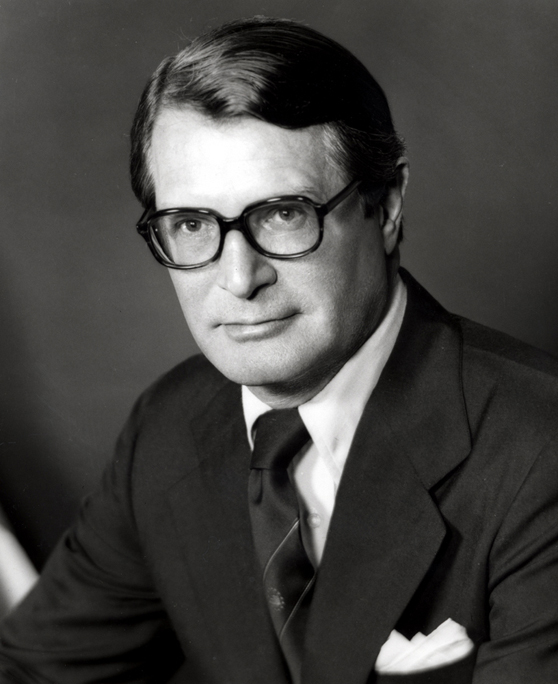
- Richardson in 1975

23rd United States Secretary of Commerce
- In office February 2, 1976 – January 20, 1977
- President: Gerald Ford
- Preceded by: Rogers Morton
- Succeeded by: Juanita M. Kreps

United States Ambassador to the United Kingdom
- In office March 21, 1975 – January 16, 1976
- President: Gerald Ford
- Preceded by: Walter Annenberg
- Succeeded by: Anne Armstrong

69th United States Attorney General
- In office May 25, 1973 – October 20, 1973
- President: Richard Nixon
- Deputy: Joseph Tyree Sneed III; William Ruckelshaus
- Preceded by: Richard Kleindienst
- Succeeded by: William B. Saxbe

11th United States Secretary of Defense
- In office January 30, 1973 – May 24, 1973
- President: Richard Nixon
- Deputy: Bill Clements
- Preceded by: Melvin Laird
- Succeeded by: James R. Schlesinger

9th United States Secretary of Health, Education, and Welfare
- In office June 24, 1970 – January 29, 1973
- President: Richard Nixon
- Preceded by: Robert Finch
- Succeeded by: Caspar Weinberger

25th United States Under Secretary of State
- In office January 23, 1969 – June 23, 1970
- President: Richard Nixon
- Preceded by: Nicholas Katzenbach
- Succeeded by: John N. Irwin II

37th Attorney General of Massachusetts
- In office January 18, 1967 – January 23, 1969
- Governor: John A. Volpe
- Preceded by: Edward T. Martin
- Succeeded by: Robert H. Quinn

62nd Lieutenant Governor of Massachusetts
- In office January 7, 1965 – January 2, 1967
- Governor: John A. Volpe
- Preceded by: Francis Bellotti
- Succeeded by: Francis Sargent

United States Attorney for the District of Massachusetts
- In office 1959–1961
- President: Dwight D. Eisenhower
- Preceded by: Anthony Julian
- Succeeded by: W. Arthur Garrity Jr.

Personal details
- Born: Elliot Lee Richardson; July 20, 1920 Boston, Massachusetts, U.S.
- Died: December 31, 1999 (aged 79) Boston, Massachusetts, U.S.
- Party: Republican
- Spouse: Anne Francis Hazard (m. 1952; died 1999)
- Children: 3, including Henry
- Education: Milton Academy
- Alma mater: Harvard University (AB, LLB)

Military service
- Allegiance: United States
- Branch/service: United States Army
- Years of service: 1942–1945
- Rank: First Lieutenant
- Unit: 4th Infantry Division; Army Medical Corps
- Battles/wars: World War II
- Awards: Bronze Star Medal; Purple Heart

Elliot Lee Richardson (July 20, 1920 – December 31, 1999) was an American lawyer and politician who was a member of the cabinets of Richard Nixon and Gerald Ford between 1970 and 1977. A member of the Republican Party, Richardson is one of two persons to hold four cabinet positions, the other being George Shultz. As United States attorney general, Richardson played a prominent role in the Watergate scandal when he resigned in protest against President Nixon's order to fire special prosecutor Archibald Cox. His resignation precipitated a crisis of confidence in Nixon which ultimately led to the president's resignation.

Born into a Boston Brahmin family, Richardson attended Harvard University. After graduating, he served in World War II as a combat medic and participated in the invasion of Normandy. He returned home, attended Harvard Law School, and clerked for Learned Hand and Felix Frankfurter before beginning his legal career at Ropes & Gray. Richardson began a long career in public office in 1959 when he was appointed by President Dwight Eisenhower to the position of United States attorney in the District of Massachusetts, the lead federal prosecutor in the state. Through the 1960s, he was a leading figure in the Massachusetts Republican Party and won election as the 62nd lieutenant governor in 1964 and the attorney general in 1966. As of 2026, he is the last Republican to serve as Massachusetts attorney general.

In 1969, he joined the Richard Nixon administration as United States under secretary of state. He was promoted to a cabinet role in 1970 as Secretary of Health, Education, and Welfare, serving until January 1973, when he became Secretary of Defense, serving briefly before he became Attorney General in May. After his high-profile resignation from the Nixon cabinet, he returned to government in the Gerald Ford administration in March 1975 as United States ambassador to the United Kingdom and Secretary of Commerce from 1976 to 1977.

After the Ford administration, Richardson returned to private practice as an attorney in Washington. He advised Democratic president Jimmy Carter on maritime law and briefly returned to politics with an unsuccessful run for United States Senate in 1984, when he lost the Republican primary to Ray Shamie.

== Early life and career ==
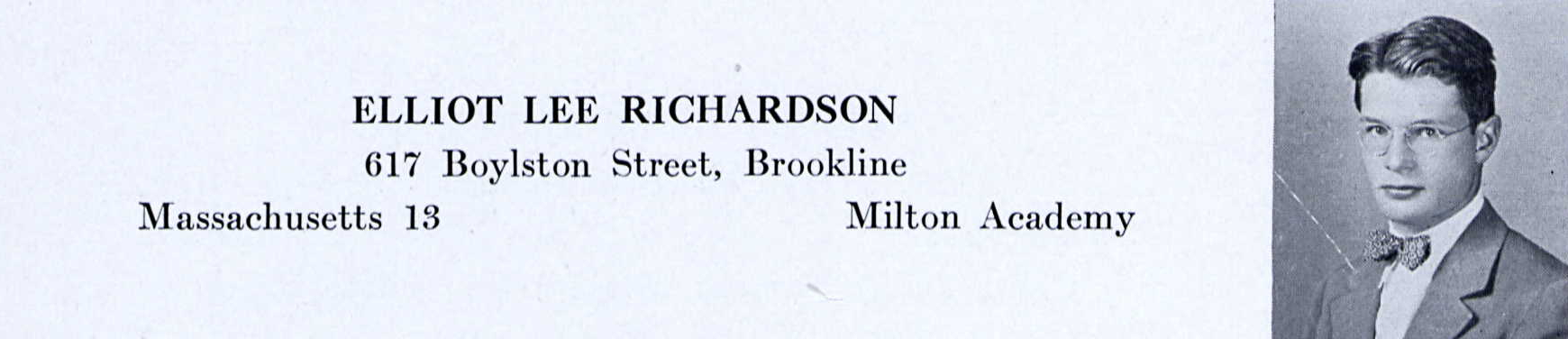
Richardson in the Harvard University 1941 yearbook

Elliot Lee Richardson was born on July 20, 1920, in Boston, Massachusetts, into a WASP family of English descent, to parents, Clara Lee Richardson (née Shattuck) and Edward Peirson Richardson. His father was a physician and professor at Harvard Medical School and member of a leading Boston Brahmin family in the city's medical community, including his father, surgeon Maurice Howe Richardson, and brother, naturalist and author Wyman Richardson. In addition to his father, both of Richardson's grandfathers, three uncles, and two of his brothers were physicians at Harvard Medical and Massachusetts General Hospital.

Richardson attended the Park School in Brookline and Milton Academy in Milton, both in Massachusetts. He then obtained his A.B. degree in philosophy from Harvard College, where he resided in Winthrop House, graduated cum laude in 1941, and was an editor of the Harvard Lampoon.

=== World War II service ===
In 1942, following the U.S. entry into World War II, Richardson enlisted as a combat medic in the U.S. 4th Infantry Division. He participated in the June 6, 1944, Normandy Invasion as a platoon leader, where he crossed a minefield to rescue a fellow officer whose foot was blown off. He was among the first troops to come up Causeway No. 2 from Utah Beach, which had been under fire from German artillery at Brécourt Manor. He was among the many who noticed the guns ceasing their firing after (unbeknownst to him) paratroopers of the 101st under Lieutenant Richard Winters had knocked them out. After Stephen Ambrose's book Band of Brothers was published, Richardson wrote to Winters and thanked him.

He continued to serve in the 4th Infantry Division throughout the European campaign and received the Bronze Star Medal and Purple Heart with oak leaf cluster. He was discharged in 1945 with the rank of first lieutenant.

=== Legal career ===
Following his discharge, Richardson enrolled at Harvard Law School. In choosing law over medicine, Richardson would later reflect, "I was not sorry to pass up medicine as a career. It seemed too much like a book I had read before." While at Harvard, he served as president of the Harvard Law Review.

After his graduation in 1947, Richardson was a law clerk for Judge Learned Hand on the United States Court of Appeals for the Second Circuit and Associate Justice Felix Frankfurter on the Supreme Court of the United States. Following his clerkships, Richardson joined the law firm Ropes, Gray, Best, Coolidge & Rugg (now Ropes & Gray) in Boston but soon became convinced that private practice "did not match the satisfaction of doing a good job for the public." In 1953, Frankfurter proposed Richardson for the presidency of Harvard when the office became open, even though Richardson was only 33 years old.

=== Early political career ===
While at Ropes & Gray, Richardson became active in Massachusetts Republican politics and supported the presidential campaign of Dwight D. Eisenhower. In 1953, he briefly joined the staff of United States senator Leverett Saltonstall before returning to private practice. In 1957, Eisenhower appointed Richardson assistant secretary for legislation in the Department of Health, Education and Welfare, where he worked to develop the National Defense Education Act and Social Security legislation.

In 1959, Eisenhower appointed Richardson to serve as United States attorney for the District of Massachusetts. He gained a reputation as a tough prosecutor with a special reputation for tax fraud cases. He later wrote, "in my Inferno, tax evaders occupy a circle of their own. ... I take great satisfaction, therefore, in the fact that during my tenure as U.S. Attorney for the district of Massachusetts, every tax evader we prosecuted was convicted, and all of them went to jail." Among his highest profile convictions was that of Bernard Goldfine, a Boston textile manufacturer, for gifts to White House aide Sherman Adams. He remained in the role through the end of the Eisenhower administration in 1961, when he returned to Ropes & Gray as a partner.

In 1962, Richardson ran for Attorney General of Massachusetts but lost the Republican primary to Edward Brooke.

After returning to the firm, Richardson left permanently in 1964 after he was elected the lieutenant governor of Massachusetts. In 1966, he was elected Attorney General of Massachusetts to succeed Brooke. As of 2025, he is the last Republican to have served as Attorney General of Massachusetts.

== Nixon administration ==
Richardson joined the Nixon administration in 1969 as undersecretary of state.

Richardson had the distinction of serving in three high-level Executive Branch posts in a single year—the tumultuous year of 1973—as the Watergate Scandal came to dominate the attention of official Washington, and the American public at large. He is one of two persons to hold four separate cabinet positions.

=== 1970–73: Secretary of Health, Education and Welfare ===
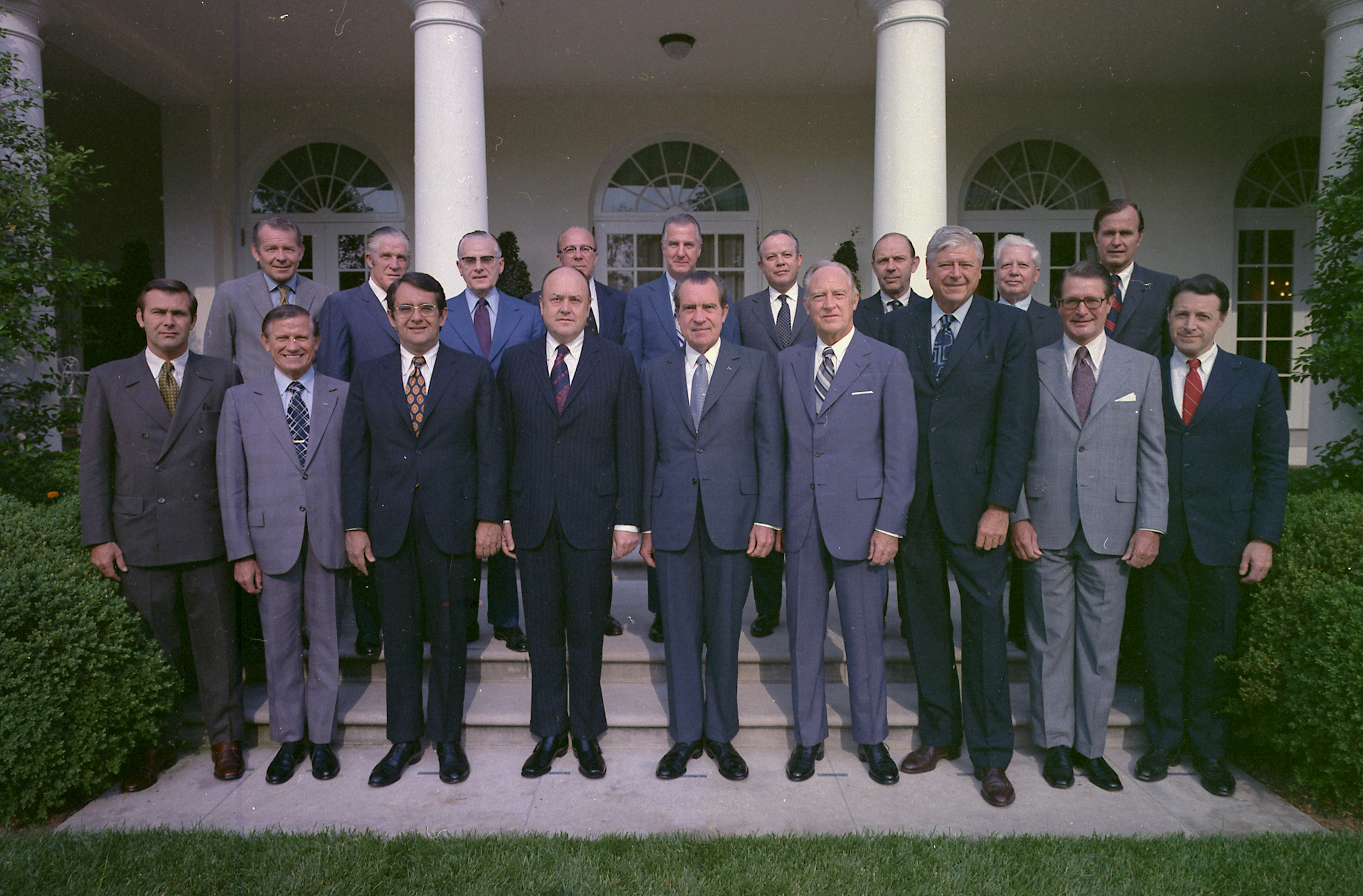
Richardson in a group photo of Nixon's cabinet on June 16, 1972, bottom row, second from the right

In June 1970, Nixon asked Richardson to serve as Secretary of the Department of Health, Education and Welfare, with the intent of reducing inefficiency and bureaucracy. At HEW, Richardson sought to simplify grant processing and consolidate duplicate programs. He faced criticism from liberals for undercutting desegregation busing programs in public schools. He also developed a national health care plan during his time at HEW.

In September 1970, Richardson was present at the funeral of President Gamal Abdel Nasser of Egypt, where he secretly met with Nasser's successor, Anwar Sadat, to discuss U.S. involvement in peace negotiations with Israel.

In 1972, Richardson established the National High Blood Pressure Education Program at the urging of Mary Lasker who came armed with copies of the Veterans Administration Cooperative Study Group on Antihypertensive Agents, directed by Edward Freis.

=== January–May 1973: Secretary of Defense ===
Richardson was appointed United States secretary of defense on January 30, 1973. When President Nixon selected Richardson as secretary, the press described him as an excellent manager and administrator. In his confirmation hearing, Richardson expressed agreement with Nixon's policies on such issues as the adequacy of U.S. strategic forces, NATO and relationships with other allies, and Vietnam. His primary role as secretary was as the administration's spokesman for the legality of the covert bombing of Cambodia.

Although he promised to examine the budget carefully to identify areas for savings, and in fact later ordered the closure of some military installations, Richardson cautioned against precipitate reductions. As he told a Senate committee, "Significant cuts in the Defense Budget now would seriously weaken the U.S. position on international negotiations—in which U.S. military capabilities, in both real and symbolic terms, are an important factor." Similarly, he strongly supported continued military assistance at current levels. During his short tenure, Richardson spent much time testifying before congressional committees on the proposed FY 1974 budget and other defense matters.

=== May–Oct 1973: U.S. attorney general ===
After only three months as Secretary of Defense, Richardson became Nixon's attorney general, a move that would put him in the Watergate spotlight.

==== Investigation of Spiro Agnew ====
As Attorney General, Richardson supervised the investigation by the U.S. attorney for the District of Maryland, George Beall, into claims that Vice President Spiro Agnew accepted bribes and kickbacks as Baltimore County executive and Governor of Maryland. By the time Richardson was sworn in as Attorney General, Beall's investigation had revealed that Agnew received five percent of county and state contracts from engineer Lester Matz during his time in office. Agnew had been aware of the investigation since February and had met with Richardson's predecessor, Richard Kleindienst, to reach Beall.

On July 3, Beall informed Richardson that Agnew had continued receiving kickbacks as vice president, meaning he was no longer shielded from prosecution by the statute of limitations. At the end of the month, White House chief of staff Alexander Haig and the President were informed, and on August 1, Beall informed Agnew's attorney that the vice president was under investigation for tax fraud and corruption.

Nixon ordered Richardson to personally take responsibility for the investigation, and he met with Agnew and his attorneys on August 6 to discuss the case. The same day, the story became public in the Wall Street Journal. Just before Agnew resigned, Richardson was portrayed as a cartoon figure with Agnew and Nixon on the October 8, 1973, cover of Time magazine. Agnew was quoted, "I am innocent of the charges against me. I will not resign if indicted!" He resigned as vice president on October 10.

Agnew later claimed Richardson had pressed for his prosecution for the specific reason that Richardson wished to be appointed as vice president, which would either give him the inside track for the Republican presidential nomination in 1976, or, should Nixon resign over Watergate, elevate Richardson to the presidency. Richardson denied taking any extraordinary steps to advance the investigation.

==== Watergate investigation and resignation ====
Richardon's primary legacy as Attorney General comes from his involvement, and eventual resignation over, the investigations into the Watergate scandal, in which White House staffers and members of the 1972 presidential campaign coordinated to break into the Democratic National Committee headquarters on June 17, 1972. By the time Richardson took office as Attorney General on May 25, 1973, the burglars had pleaded or been found guilty and the week prior, the United States Senate had begun a series of hearings into the matter.

On his first day in office, Richardson appointed Archibald Cox to serve as a special prosecutor for the federal investigation into possible ties between the Nixon administration and the break-in. Following the revelation of the existence of recordings of conversations within the White House, Nixon refused to comply with subpoenas by both Cox and the Senate committee. On October 20, President Nixon ordered Richardson to fire Cox as special prosecutor. Richardson had promised Congress he would not interfere with the special prosecutor, and, rather than breaking his promise, he resigned. Addressing the Justice Department attorneys, he said, "I can only say that you have here a situation in which the president, and I know nothing to call this into question, believed that the confidentiality of communications to the president was fundamentally important."

President Nixon subsequently ordered Richardson's second-in-command, Deputy Attorney General William Ruckelshaus, to carry out the order. He too had promised not to interfere and also tendered his resignation. The third-ranking Department of Justice official, United States solicitor general Robert Bork, planned to resign after firing Cox, but Richardson persuaded him not to in order to ensure proper leadership at the Department of Justice during the crisis. Bork carried out the president's order, thus completing the events generally referred to as the Saturday Night Massacre. When Bork was unsuccessfully nominated to the Supreme Court of the United States by President Ronald Reagan in 1987, Richardson testified on his behalf.

In 1974, Richardson received the John Heinz Award for Greatest Public Service by an Elected or Appointed Official, an award given out annually by Jefferson Awards. Despite the popular acclaim Richardson received for his refusal to fire Cox, he privately told friends he was deeply troubled by his decision, which conflicted with his sense of loyalty and allegiance to President Nixon. He later characterized the episode as his "brief period of notoriety."

Reflecting on Watergate in his memoirs, Richardson wrote that he had attempted to persuade Nixon to take a different course before eventually refusing him. "The height of irony," Richardson wrote, "was that even a belated display of openness could have saved Nixon from the consequences of his own evasion of it. ... I said to Fred Buzhardt, counsel to the president, 'You ought, instead, tell Archie Cox to send over a truck and load it up with all the material he and his staff could possibly want.' In the event, if anything damaging was found, Nixon could issue a public apology and couple it with a convincing expression of penitence. The American people, I thought, would be more than likely to forgive and forget." Pat Buchanan recounted that on the day Richardson was dismissed, Nixon said, "I don't have any choice, I can't have President [Leonid] Brezhnev watch me be bullied by a member of my cabinet, I've got to fire him."

== Ford administration ==
During the Gerald Ford administration, Richardson served as Ambassador to the United Kingdom from 1975 to 1976 and as United States secretary of commerce from 1976 to 1977.

Richardson's acceptance in 1975 of the appointment as Ambassador to the Court of St. James's, as it is formally titled, effectively eliminated him from the domestic scene during the pre-election-year period. In departing for that position, he indicated to reporters that he would not run for the presidency unless Ford decided against running for a term in his own right.

== Later life ==
From 1977 to 1980, he served as an ambassador-at-large and a special representative of President Jimmy Carter for the United Nations Convention on the Law of the Sea and head of the U.S. delegation to the third United Nations Conference on the Law of the Sea.

From 1980 to 1992, Richardson was partner in the Washington office of Milbank, Tweed, Hadley & McCloy. In the 1980s and early 1990s, Richardson was the attorney for Inslaw, Inc., an American software company which alleged that its software had been pirated by the U.S. Justice Department. In 1994, Richardson backed President Bill Clinton during his struggle against Paula Jones's charge of sexual harassment. In 1998, he received the Presidential Medal of Freedom, the nation's highest civilian honor.

In 1984, he ran for the Republican nomination for the U.S. Senate seat being vacated by Paul Tsongas. Although Richardson was favored to win the seat, he was defeated in the GOP primary by more conservative candidate Ray Shamie, who lost the general election to John Kerry.

In a 1997 interview with Geoffrey Kabaservice, Richardson argued that the Clinton administration was to the right of the Republican administrations of Richard Nixon and Dwight D. Eisenhower.

== Personal life ==
Richardson's older son, Henry S. Richardson, is a professor of philosophy at Georgetown University, where he focuses on moral and political philosophy.

Richardson was elected a fellow of the American Academy of Arts and Sciences in 1958. Richardson was also an active Freemason as a member of the Grand Lodge of Ancient Free and Accepted Masons of the Commonwealth of Massachusetts and a 33rd degree Freemason in the Scottish Rite Northern Masonic Jurisdiction. In 1980, Richardson received an honorary degree from Bates College. In 1983, Richardson was admitted as an honorary member of the Massachusetts Society of the Cincinnati.

Richardson was a Unitarian Universalist.

=== Author ===
Richardson was the author of two books. The Creative Balance: Government, Politics, and the Individual in America's Third Century was published by Holt, Rinehart and Winston in 1976. Reflections of a Radical Moderate was published by Westview Press in 1996. Reflections expresses his outlook:

I am a moderate – a radical moderate. I believe profoundly in the ultimate value of human dignity and equality. I therefore believe as well in such essential contributions to these ends as fairness, tolerance, and mutual respect. In seeking to be fair, tolerant, and respectful I need to call upon all the empathy, understanding, rationality, skepticism, balance, and objectivity I can muster.

In the same book, Richardson decries "excessive government legislation", but also notes that the government is necessary to tackle serious issues.

In 1972, Richardson was awarded an honorary Doctor of Humane Letters (L.H.D.) degree from Whittier College. In 1974 Richardson gave the commencement address at Rose-Hulman Institute of Technology and received an honorary Doctors of Law.

== Death and legacy ==
Richardson's wife, Anne, died on July 26, 1999. On December 29, 1999, Richardson was admitted to Massachusetts General Hospital while visiting family in Boston, and died two days later of a cerebral hemorrhage at the age of 79.

President Bill Clinton issued a public statement hailing Richardson as "an unparalleled public servant" and "a man of uncommon integrity, who put the nation's interests first even when the personal cost was very high." The Associated Press wrote that Mr. Richardson was "a man of immaculate attire and rare distinction, a flexible George Apley with wit ... a relentless achiever with a dazzling variety of government experience, a man of elegance and charm with spectacular mental powers, a prince of the Eastern Establishment."

=== In popular culture ===
An image of Richardson taken by photographer Garry Winogrand is featured on the cover art of rock band Interpol's 2018 album Marauder. Singer and guitarist Paul Banks referred to him as a hero, who "refused to be bullied into going against his personal principles".

Online menswear commentator Derek Guy uses an illustration of Richardson as his avatar, and has said that "he was one of the best-dressed men in American politics, ever."

== See also ==
- List of law clerks for the second seat of the Supreme Court of the United States

Party political offices
Preceded by Francis W. Perry	Republican nominee for Lieutenant Governor of Massachusetts; 1964	Succeeded by Francis Sargent
Preceded by Edward Brooke	Republican nominee for Attorney General of Massachusetts; 1966	Succeeded by Donald L. Conn
Political offices
Preceded by Francis X. Bellotti	Lieutenant Governor of Massachusetts; 1965–1967	Succeeded by Francis W. Sargent
Preceded by Nicholas Katzenbach	United States Under Secretary of State; 1969–1970	Succeeded by John N. Irwin II
Preceded by Robert Finch	United States Secretary of Health, Education, and Welfare; 1970–1973	Succeeded by Caspar Weinberger
Preceded by Melvin Laird	United States Secretary of Defense; 1973	Succeeded by James R. Schlesinger
Preceded by Rogers Morton	United States Secretary of Commerce; 1976–1977	Succeeded by Juanita M. Kreps
Legal offices
Preceded by Edward T. Martin	Attorney General of Massachusetts; 1967–1969	Succeeded by Robert H. Quinn
Preceded by Richard Kleindienst	United States Attorney General; 1973	Succeeded by William B. Saxbe
Diplomatic posts
Preceded by Walter Annenberg	United States Ambassador to the United Kingdom; 1975–1976	Succeeded by Anne Armstrong
