= Robert T. Hartmann =

American politician and journalist (1917–2008)

Bob Hartmann
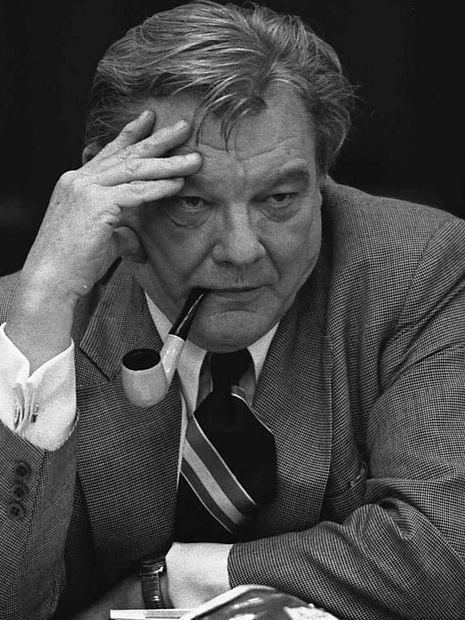
- Hartmann in 1974

Assistant to the President Counselor to the President
- In office August 9, 1974 – January 20, 1977
- President: Gerald Ford
- Preceded by: Anne Armstrong; Dean Burch; Kenneth Rush
- Succeeded by: Edwin Meese (1981)

Assistant to the President White House Director of Speechwriting
- In office August 9, 1974 – January 20, 1977
- President: Gerald Ford
- Preceded by: David Gergen
- Succeeded by: James Fallows

Assistant to the President Chief of Staff to the Vice President
- In office December 6, 1973 – August 9, 1974
- Vice President: Gerald Ford
- Preceded by: Arthur Sohmer
- Succeeded by: Ann C. Whitman

Personal details
- Born: Robert Trowbridge Hartmann; April 8, 1917 Rapid City, South Dakota, U.S.
- Died: April 11, 2008 (aged 91) Washington, D.C., U.S.
- Party: Republican
- Spouse: Roberta Sankey
- Education: Stanford University (BA)

Military service
- Allegiance: United States
- Branch/service: United States Navy
- Years of service: 1941–1945 (Active); 1945–1977 (Reserve)
- Rank: Captain
- Battles/wars: World War II

Robert Trowbridge Hartmann (April 8, 1917 – April 11, 2008) was an American political advisor, speechwriter and reporter, who served as chief of staff for Vice President Gerald Ford and Counselor to the President when Ford was elevated to the presidency in 1974.

== Early life and career ==
Hartmann was born April 8, 1917, in Rapid City, South Dakota, the only child of Miner Louis and Elizabeth Trowbridge Hartmann. His father was a chemical engineer and a patent lawyer. Hartmann grew up in upstate New York and Southern California.

Hartmann joined the Los Angeles Times as a reporter in 1939, a year after graduating from Stanford University.

During World War II, he worked in public relations and press censorship roles for the Navy in the Pacific. He retired from the Navy Reserve in 1977 with the rank of captain.

Resuming his career at the Times after the war, Hartmann was Washington, D.C. bureau chief from 1954 to 1963 and finished his newspaper career the next year after opening a bureau in Rome.

== Early political career ==
After leaving the Times, Hartmann became an information adviser for the United Nations Food and Agriculture Organization. In 1966, he went to work for the House Republican Conference as a press aide.

In 1969, Hartmann joined the staff of then-minority leader Gerald Ford as a legislative assistant, rising to become one of Ford's most trusted advisors.

== Chief of Staff to the Vice President ==
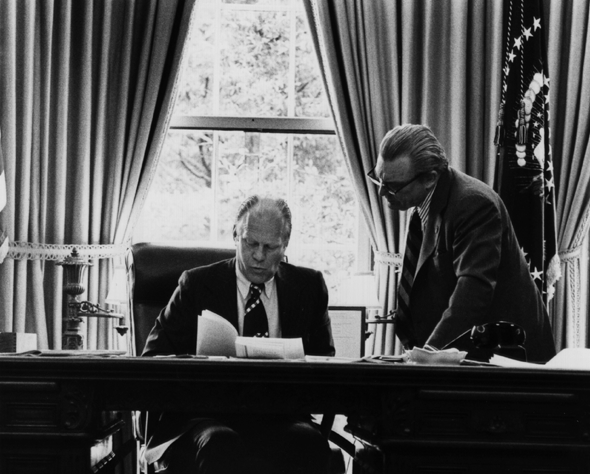
Ford and Hartmann at work in the Oval Office writing the President's upcoming speech before a joint session of Congress, August 12, 1974

After President Richard Nixon nominated Gerald Ford to be Vice President on October 12, 1973, Hartmann coordinated Ford's preparations for the confirmation hearings on the nomination. He then became Vice President Ford's chief of staff. When it became clear that the burden of administrative matters – hiring staff, finding office space, etc. – kept Hartmann from devoting sufficient time to speeches, political liaison, and advising the Vice President, Ford hired L. William Seidman as an assistant for administration, which left Hartmann to advise Ford on political matters.

== Counselor to the President ==
When Ford succeeded Nixon to the presidency on August 9, 1974, he named Hartmann as Counselor to the President, with Cabinet status. In this position, one of Hartmann's main responsibilities was supervision of the editorial staff in the preparation of presidential speeches, statements, messages, and correspondence. He also handled White House liaison with Republican Party organizations and advised President Ford on a wide variety of matters that went beyond his formal duties.

Hartmann drafted Ford's address to the nation upon taking office, coining the phrase "long national nightmare" to describe the Watergate scandal and resignation of Nixon.

== Later life ==
After Ford left office, Hartmann served as a senior research fellow at the Hoover Institution at Stanford University, his alma mater, and a trustee of the Gerald R. Ford Foundation.

In 1980, he wrote his autobiography, Palace Politics, focusing on his time at the White House.

Hartman died on April 11, 2008 in Washington, D.C., at the age of 91.

Political offices
Preceded by Anne Armstrong	Counselor to the President; 1974–1977; Served alongside: Anne Armstrong, Dean Burch, Rogers Morton, John Marsh, Kenneth Rush	Vacant Title next held by Edwin Meese
Preceded by Dean Burch	Counselor to the President; 1974–1977; Served alongside: Anne Armstrong, Dean Burch, Rogers Morton, John Marsh, Kenneth Rush	Vacant Title next held by Edwin Meese
Preceded by Kenneth Rush	Counselor to the President; 1974–1977; Served alongside: Anne Armstrong, Dean Burch, Rogers Morton, John Marsh, Kenneth Rush	Vacant Title next held by Edwin Meese
