= Rogers Morton =

American politician (1914–1979)

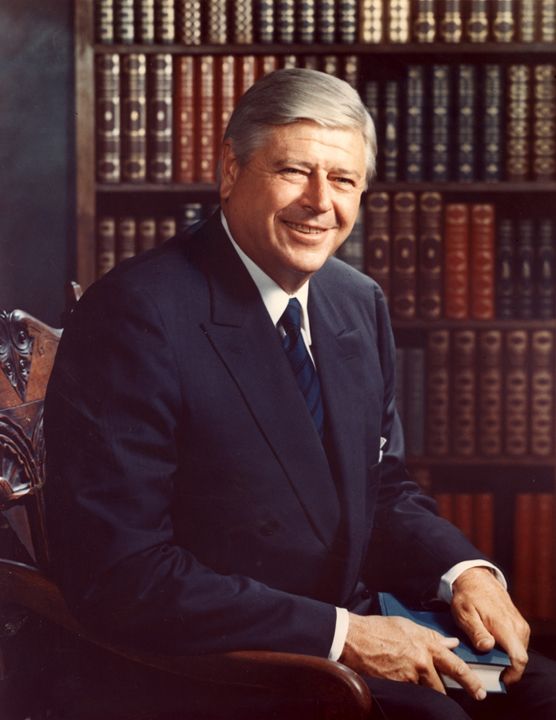

Counselor to the President
- In office February 2, 1976 – April 1, 1976
- President: Gerald Ford
- Preceded by: Robert T. Hartmann; John Marsh
- Succeeded by: Robert T. Hartmann; John Marsh

22nd United States Secretary of Commerce
- In office May 1, 1975 – February 2, 1976
- President: Gerald Ford
- Preceded by: Frederick B. Dent
- Succeeded by: Elliot Richardson

39th United States Secretary of the Interior
- In office January 29, 1971 – April 30, 1975
- President: Richard Nixon; Gerald Ford
- Preceded by: Wally Hickel
- Succeeded by: Stanley K. Hathaway

Chair of the Republican National Committee
- In office April 14, 1969 – January 15, 1971
- Preceded by: Ray C. Bliss
- Succeeded by: Bob Dole

Member of the U.S. House of Representatives from Maryland's 1st district
- In office January 3, 1963 – January 29, 1971
- Preceded by: Thomas Johnson
- Succeeded by: Bill Mills

Personal details
- Born: Rogers Clark Ballard Morton; September 19, 1914 Louisville, Kentucky, U.S.
- Died: April 19, 1979 (aged 64) Easton, Maryland, U.S.
- Party: Republican
- Spouse: Anne Jones (m. 1939)
- Children: 2
- Relatives: Thruston Ballard Morton (brother)
- Education: Yale University (BS); Columbia University (attended)

Military service
- Allegiance: United States
- Branch/service: United States Navy; United States Army
- Battles/wars: World War II

Rogers Clark Ballard Morton (September 19, 1914 – April 19, 1979) was an American politician who served as the U.S. Secretary of the Interior and Secretary of Commerce during the administrations of presidents Richard Nixon and Gerald Ford, respectively. He also served as a member of the U.S. House of Representatives from Maryland.

Morton was born in Louisville, Kentucky, and moved to a farm on the Eastern Shore of Maryland in the early 1950s. In 1962, he was elected to the House of Representatives, in which capacity he established a pro-environment record. Morton would joke that his two middle initials stood for "Chesapeake Bay". In 1968, Morton played a major role in Richard Nixon's campaign for president, and was chosen by Nixon in 1969 to serve as chairman of the Republican National Committee.

In the elections of 1970, Morton was considered a strong candidate to challenge Joseph Tydings for his U.S. Senate seat from Maryland, but he chose instead to remain as chairman of the RNC. In 1971, President Nixon tapped Morton to serve as Secretary of the Interior, during which time he oversaw the construction of the Trans-Alaska Pipeline System and the 1973 oil crisis. Morton was the only person from the East Coast to serve as head of the Interior Department in the 20th century.

Following Nixon's resignation due to the Watergate Scandal, Morton continued in his post in the Gerald Ford administration until 1975, when he was nominated to serve as Secretary of Commerce. From April to August 1976, Morton served as Ford's campaign manager in his bid for election. Morton retired from politics following Ford's election defeat. Three years later, he died of cancer at his home in Easton on the eastern shore of Maryland.

== Early life and career ==
Morton was born in Louisville, the son of David Clark Morton, a physician, and his wife, Mary Harris Ballard Morton, an heiress to a flour milling business. He was related to George Rogers Clark, a military officer who served during the American Revolutionary War. Morton was one of three children; his brother Thruston B. Morton also had a career in politics, serving as chairman of the Republican National Committee and representing Kentucky in both the United States House of Representatives and then the United States Senate.

Morton received his early education from the Woodberry Forest School near Orange, Virginia, and in 1937 graduated from Yale University, where he was a brother of the Delta Kappa Epsilon fraternity (Phi chapter). Like his father, Morton worked to become a physician and entered the Columbia University College of Physicians and Surgeons. However, he dropped out after only one year. In 1939, Morton married the former Anne Jones. They had two children, David Clark and Anne Morton.

In 1938, Morton was commissioned in the United States Navy but only served for a short time due to problems with his back. Afterwards, he entered his family's flour business, Ballard & Ballard. In 1941, at the outset of World War II, Morton enlisted in the Armored Field Artillery of the United States Army as a private and served in the European Theater. He received a commission during the war and left the army as a captain in 1945.

After the war, Morton returned to the family business, where he served as president from 1947 to 1951. In 1952, the business was merged into the Pillsbury Flour Company, where Morton went on to serve as a director and a member of the executive committee for several more years.

== Congressional career ==
In 1947, Morton spent a great deal of time helping his brother Thruston in his ultimately successful campaign for election to the House of Representatives in Kentucky. After this initial exposure to politics, Morton moved to the Eastern Shore of Maryland in the early 1950s, where he set up a 1,400 acres (5.7 km^{2}) cattle farm along the Wye River in Talbot County. In 1962, Morton decided to challenge Democratic incumbent Thomas Francis Johnson of Maryland's 1st congressional district. Johnson, who was reeling from a political scandal, lost to Morton in the general election. Morton was lauded for not making Johnson's legal troubles his primary campaign issue.

Morton was reelected to Congress four more times, and served from 1963 until 1971. In Congress, Morton worked to enact legislation that would preserve the Chesapeake Bay, including laws reducing pollution into the bay, working for the creation of a national park on Assateague Island, and providing funds to the Army Corps of Engineers to model how the Bay functions as an estuary. Concerning civil rights, Morton voted for the Civil Rights Act of 1964 and the Voting Rights Act of 1965, but cast no vote on the Civil Rights Act of 1968.

During the 1968 Republican National Convention, Morton served as the floor manager for eventual presidential nominee Richard Nixon. Morton also delivered the speech nominating Spiro Agnew, then-governor of Maryland, as the vice presidential candidate.

Due to his role in Nixon's election campaign and his environmental advocacy, Morton expected to be appointed as Secretary of the Interior in 1969. However, he was passed over for the position in favor of a westerner. He had also been considered for Nixon's vice presidential running mate, but lost out to Agnew. In January 1969, to recognize his efforts, Nixon appointed Morton as chairman of the Republican National Committee. As chairman, Morton was granted ex officio cabinet rank by Nixon, an unprecedented practice that ultimately continued through the administration of Gerald Ford.

== 1970 United States Senate election ==
In 1969, leading up to the 1970 elections, Morton was considered one of the strongest potential candidates to challenge incumbent Democratic senator Joseph Tydings. Morton had sought the Republican nomination for Maryland's other U.S. Senate seat in the 1968 elections, but bowed out in favor of Congressman Charles Mathias to prevent a primary battle.

Speculation that Morton would seek election to Tydings' seat increased after an editorial in the Baltimore Sun encouraged him to challenge Tydings. Sources within the administration of Vice President Spiro Agnew, who was formerly governor of Maryland, were also commenting that Morton would make a strong candidate and would likely run. When Morton stated he would be making an important announcement with President Nixon in December 1969, it seemed all but certain at the time that it would be to declare his candidacy.

However, Republicans around the country were concerned that Morton, who had just been appointed chairman of the RNC in January 1969, would resign during the election season to better handle the battle with Tydings. President Nixon shared their concerns, and encouraged Morton to remain as chairman. On December 16, 1969, with Nixon by his side, Morton announced that his priorities were with the national committee, and that he would not seek Tydings' seat. Morton also threw his full support for the nomination behind J. Glenn Beall Jr., a freshman member of the House from Cumberland, Mathias's successor in the House, and son of former senator James Glenn Beall.

Morton's decision not to challenge Tydings initially worried Maryland Republicans, who saw Morton as one of their best candidates. National Republican strategists had also begun to write off Tydings' seat as unwinnable for the 1970 election because of Tydings' wealth and popularity in the dense urban areas of Montgomery County and Baltimore. However, despite initial misgivings by state Republicans, Beall defeated Tydings on November 3, 1970, by a margin of more than 30,000 votes.

== Secretary of the Interior ==
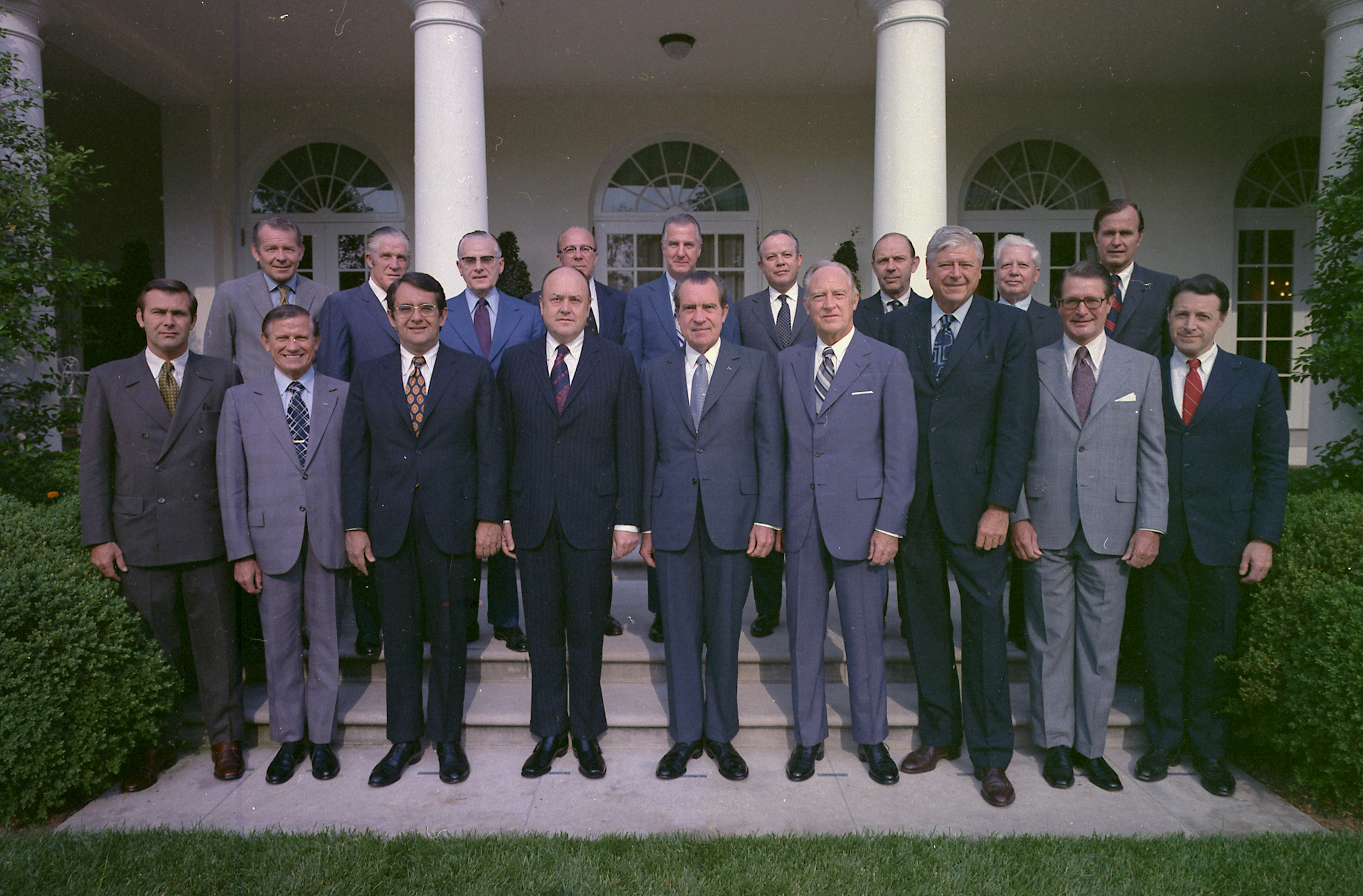
Rogers Morton in a group photo of Nixon's cabinet on June 16, 1972, third from the right on the bottom row.

Morton continued to serve in the House and as chairman of the RNC until 1971, when he was nominated to be Secretary of the Interior by President Nixon. He was unanimously confirmed by the United States Senate Subcommittee on the Interior, though some concerns regarding Morton's record of environmental protection were raised by Phillip Berry, then-President of the Sierra Club. Morton's predecessor, Wally Hickel, had been chosen over Morton to fill the job in 1969, but was fired by Nixon in late 1970 for criticizing White House policy. Morton was the only person from the east coast to serve as Interior Secretary in the 20th century.

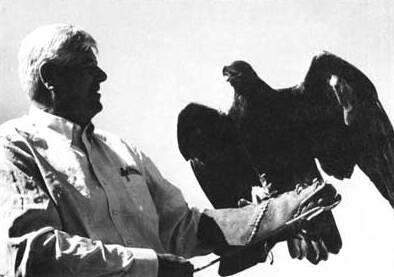
Morton holding a bird as Secretary of the Interior

Upon assuming the office of Secretary of the Interior, Morton promised he would seek to "purify the environment". However, as his tenure progressed, he was gradually isolated from the proceedings of the White House and lost several major divisions to other departments. During the 1973 oil crisis, for example, the oil and natural gas divisions of the department were transferred to the Office of Emergency Preparedness. Furthermore, though Morton was the one who announced the construction of the Trans-Alaska Pipeline System, speculation was put forward that he did not play a major role in determining its route.

As he was leaving his post in 1975, further criticism was directed at Morton for his overseeing the partial dismantling of the Interior Department. He was also criticized for lacking the vigor necessary to serve as head of a cabinet department, and for failing to see through the proposed creation of a new, stronger cabinet department that would have replaced Interior.

== Secretary of Commerce and the Ford administration ==
Following the resignation of President Nixon in the Watergate scandal, Morton continued in his position as Secretary of the Interior in the administration of President Gerald Ford. In March 1975, while still serving as the head of the Interior Department, Morton was nominated by Ford to serve as the next Secretary of Commerce. Ford cited Morton's extensive business experience as the primary factor for selecting him and expressed the hope that Morton would be able to "encourage American business to expand energy development and conservation efforts".

In January 1976, Ford announced Morton would be resigning as commerce secretary to instead serve as Counselor to the President with cabinet rank. Morton's new position was to advise the president on domestic and economic policy. In addition, Morton was to serve as the special liaison to the political committee to elect President Ford. Morton's duties blurred the line between his public and political duties, and caused controversy concerning how Morton would divide his time between the White House and Ford's election campaign, and how much of his salary would be supplied by taxpayers versus the Ford election committee. In rebuttal, Morton stated "you can't separate government from politics", and that Presidential aides should be allowed to offer political advice.

In April 1976, Morton was named campaign manager for Ford leading up to the 1976 presidential election. He replaced former U.S. Representative Bo Callaway of Georgia, who was forced to resign following allegations of improper use of authority while he was Secretary of the Army. Morton directed Ford's campaign until August 25, 1976, when he was reassigned as chairman of a steering committee and was replaced by James Baker of Houston, Texas. Morton's demotion was at his own request; he said that he no longer wished to bear "the responsibility and accountability of the chairmanship". After the 1976 campaign, Morton retired from politics.

== Later life ==
After his retirement, Morton lived in his farm, "Presqu'isle", near Easton, Maryland, where he operated a boat construction business.

Morton had been diagnosed with prostate cancer in 1973, but he said that the disease was in its early phase and was still treatable. In 1979, however, Morton died of the cancer at his home in Easton. He is interred in Old Wye Cemetery in Wye Mills, Maryland.

U.S. House of Representatives
Preceded by Thomas Johnson	Member of the U.S. House of Representatives from Maryland's 1st congressional district 1963–1971	Succeeded by William O. Mills
Party political offices
Preceded by Spiro Agnew	Republican nominee for Governor of Maryland; 1969	Succeeded by Stanley Blair
Preceded by Ray C. Bliss	Chair of the Republican National Committee; 1969–1971	Succeeded by Bob Dole
Political offices
Preceded by Wally Hickel	United States Secretary of the Interior; 1971–1975	Succeeded by Stanley K. Hathaway
Preceded by Frederick B. Dent	United States Secretary of Commerce; 1975–1976	Succeeded by Elliot Richardson
Preceded by Robert Hartmann; John Marsh	Counselor to the President; 1976; Served alongside: Robert Hartmann, John Marsh	Succeeded by Robert Hartmann; John Marsh
