= Wilbur J. Carr =

American diplomat and reformer

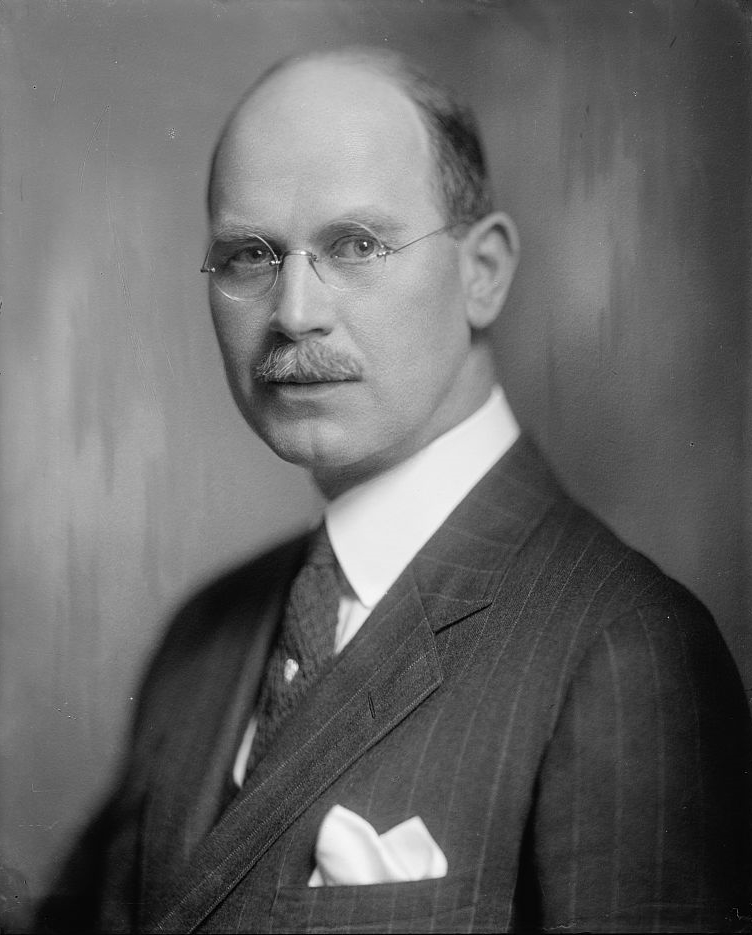

United States Minister to Czechoslovakia
- In office July 13, 1937 – April 6, 1939
- President: Franklin D. Roosevelt
- Preceded by: J. Butler Wright
- Succeeded by: Anthony J. Biddle Jr.

United States Assistant Secretary of State
- In office July 1, 1924 – July 28, 1937
- President: Calvin Coolidge; Herbert Hoover; Franklin D. Roosevelt
- Preceded by: Leland B. Harrison
- Succeeded by: George S. Messersmith

Personal details
- Born: October 31, 1870 Taylorsville, Ohio, U.S.
- Died: June 26, 1942 (aged 71) Baltimore, Maryland, U.S.
- Cause of death: Myocardial infarction
- Spouse(s): Mary Eugenia Crane; Edith Adele Koon (m. 1917)
- Education: University of Kentucky; George Washington University (LL.B.); Columbian University (LL.M.)
- Profession: Diplomat

Wilbur John Carr (October 31, 1870 - June 26, 1942) was an American diplomat. He was a leader in building a professional American diplomatic corps, cutting it loose from domestic politics. He was named one of three Great Civil Servants, along with William Hunter, and Alvey Augustus Adee.

== Early life and education ==
He was born in Taylorsville, Ohio, on October 31, 1870. He attended college in Kentucky, graduating from the Commercial College of the University of Kentucky in 1889. After taking a shorthand course, he became a stenographer and accountant at Peekskill Military Academy while continuing his education. In 1894, he received an LL.B. from Georgetown University; in 1899, he was awarded an LL.M. from Columbian University.

== Career ==
On June 1, 1892, he was appointed a clerk in the Department of State. Ten years later, he became Chief of the Consular Bureau, then Chief Clerk of the Department. On November 30, 1909, he became Director of the Consular Service, an office created specifically for him, and which he held through June 30, 1924. He helped establish Civil Service reform, leading to the Rogers Act.

Carr's most prominent success in bringing professionalism to the foreign service was achieving passage of the Lodge Act of April 1906. It made officers of the Consular Service careerists on regular salaries, rather than amateurs who depended on collecting fees from applications. He worked with President Theodore Roosevelt on the executive order of June 1906 which ended the patronage system of appointing consuls for reasons of domestic politics, and instead required promotions by merit through competitive examinations. Additional laws of 1915 and 1931 created the Division of Foreign Service Personnel, of which Carr was the first chairman. He personally drafted the critical Rogers Act of 1924 which united the two rival services, consular and diplomatic, into an integrated Foreign Service. He helped design the quota system of the Immigration Act of 1924, giving significant powers to consuls to issue immigration visas. The promotion of American commerce was also a high priority, which he emphasized to consuls. He often found himself in opposition to old-line diplomats in the State Department.

From July 1, 1924 to July 28, 1937, Carr was Assistant Secretary of State. In 1937, President Franklin D. Roosevelt appointed him U.S. ambassador to Czechoslovakia. In this time, among other activities, he documented the livelihoods and natural beauties of the country as an amateur videographer. He was recalled in 1939, after the German invasion of Czechoslovakia forced the closure of the embassy.

There is direct evidence that Carr was anti-Semitic and that his antipathy to Jews had a long history.

== Later life and death ==
Carr retired from the United States Foreign Service after returning to the United States.

Wilbur J. Carr died on June 26, 1942, of a heart attack, at Johns Hopkins Hospital.

== Works ==
- "The American consular service." American Journal of International Law 1.4 (1907): 891-913.
- "W. J. Carr Discusses Consular Service". The Harvard Crimson. March 21, 1921.
- "What Your Consuls Do". American Consular Bulletin. 4 (1): 3–5, 20–25. January 1922.

His papers are held at the Library of Congress.
