= Spruille Braden =

American diplomat (1894–1978)

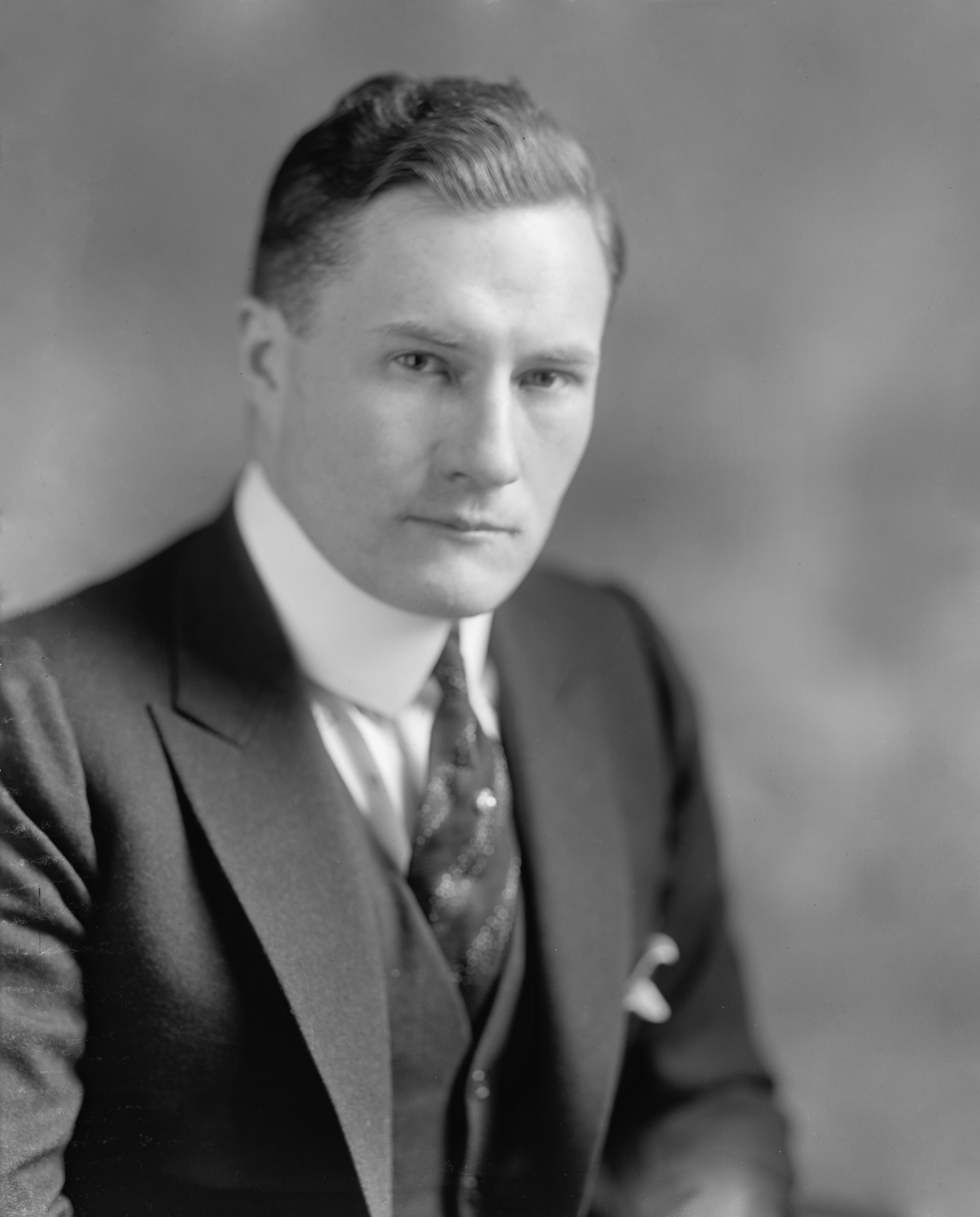

2nd Assistant Secretary of State for American Republic Affairs
- In office October 29, 1945 – June 27, 1947
- President: Harry S. Truman
- Preceded by: Nelson Rockefeller
- Succeeded by: Edward G. Miller, Jr.

27th United States Ambassador to Argentina
- In office May 21, 1945 – September 23, 1945
- President: Harry S. Truman
- Preceded by: Norman Armour
- Succeeded by: George S. Messersmith

8th United States Ambassador to Cuba
- In office May 19, 1942 – April 27, 1945
- President: Franklin D. Roosevelt; Harry S. Truman
- Preceded by: George S. Messersmith
- Succeeded by: R. Henry Norweb

1st United States Ambassador to Colombia
- In office February 15, 1939 – March 12, 1942
- President: Franklin D. Roosevelt
- Preceded by: William Dawson
- Succeeded by: Arthur Bliss Lane

Personal details
- Born: March 13, 1894 Elkhorn, Montana, U.S.
- Died: January 10, 1978 (aged 83) Los Angeles, California, U.S.
- Spouse(s): Maria Humeres Solar (1915–1962); Verbena Williams Hebbard (1964–1977)
- Children: Maruja Lyons; Laura Iselina Young; William Braden; Patricia Clark; Spruille Braden, Jr.
- Education: Sheffield Scientific School
- Profession: Mining Engineer (BMinE, PhD MinE)

Spruille Braden (/ˈspruːl ˈbreɪdən/ SPROOL BRAY-dən; March 13, 1894 – January 10, 1978) was an American diplomat, businessman, lobbyist, and member of the Council on Foreign Relations. He served as the ambassador to various Latin American countries, and as Assistant Secretary of State for Western Hemisphere Affairs. He is notable for his interventionist activities and his prominent role in several coups d'état.

Braden served on the national council of the John Birch Society.

== Early life ==
Born in Elkhorn, Montana, Braden was the son of a leading engineer at Anaconda Copper Company's properties in Chile, William Burford Braden. He attended Montclair Kimberley Academy and Yale, earning a degree in engineering in 1914. He worked as a mining engineer and consultant to governments in Latin America, returning to the US in 1920.

Braden first came to prominence as one of the owners of the Braden Copper Company in Chile and as a shareholder in the United Fruit Company. He also directed the W. Averell Harriman Securities Corporation. As an agent of Standard Oil, he played a role in the Chaco War between Bolivia and Paraguay and espoused an openly anti-union position.

Braden was a delegate to the Montevideo Convention (Seventh International Conference of American States) in Montevideo, Uruguay in 1933, where he sat with Secretary of State Cordell Hull; former American ambassador to Mexico J. Reuben Clark; American minister to Uruguay J. Butler Wright; and University of Chicago professor Sophonisba Breckinridge.

== Latin American diplomatic roles ==
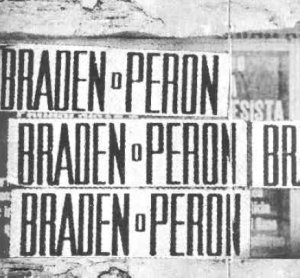
Braden o Perón ("Braden or Perón") campaign posters during the 1946 Argentine general election

He held several brief but important ambassadorships in Colombia (1939–1942), Cuba (1942), and Argentina. As ambassador to Argentina for four months in 1945, Braden encouraged the opposition against President Edelmiro Julián Farrell and Juan Perón. Perón exploited his intervention with a slogan, Braden o Perón ("Braden or Perón"), which contributed to Perón's victory in the presidential election the following year.

Braden accused Perón of being pro-Axis and anti-United Nations, and of plotting against Allied interests in South America, including the protection of industrial and commercial Axis assets and massive violations of human rights.

In 1945, Braden served as Assistant Secretary of State for Western Hemisphere Affairs under Harry Truman. He clashed with George S. Messersmith, former ambassador to Mexico, with whom he had many disagreements about foreign policy in Latin America. The disagreement with Braden would eventually force Messersmith out of the foreign service.

Beginning in 1948, Braden was a paid lobbyist for the United Fruit Company. When the company's interests were threatened in Guatemala by President Jacobo Arbenz Guzmán, Braden helped to conceive and execute the 1954 coup d'état that overthrew him. In his first act as newly ignaugurated President of Nicaragua on May 1, 1967, Anastasio Somoza Debayle conferred Nicaragua's highest decoration, the Grand Cross of Ruben Dario, on Ambassador Spruille Braden and his wife Verbena for their "unstinting efforts in the cause of freedom in all of Latin America".

Diplomatic "finesse and patience" are all right under the Marquis of Queensbury rules, but they may bring defeat if applied in a bar-room brawl, such as we are engaged in with the Kremlin. Frequently it is necessary to fight fire with fire. No one is more opposed than I to interfere in the internal affairs of other nations. But... we may be compelled to intervene.... I should like to underscore that because Communism is so blatantly an international and not internal affair, its suppression, even by force, in an American country, by one or more of the other republics, would not constitute an intervention in the internal affairs of the former....

Braden served as the president of the Citizens Committee for a Free Cuba.

== Later life ==
Braden served as president of the Metropolitan Club of New York, founded in 1891 by J. P. Morgan, from 1967 to 1973.

He died in Los Angeles of a heart ailment after unsuccessfully lobbying against the Torrijos–Carter Treaties.

== Works ==
- Diplomats and Demagogues: The Memoirs of Spruille Braden, Arlington House, 1971, ISBN 9780870001253

== See also ==
- United Fruit Company
- Peronism

== Works cited ==
- Scenna, Miguel A. (1974), Braden y Perón, Buenos Aires: Korrigan.
- Frank, Gary (1980). Juan Peron vs. Spruille Braden : the story behind the blue book. Lanham, MD : University Press of America
- Trask, Roger R. Spruille Braden versus George Messersmith: World War II, the Cold War, and Argentine Policy, 1945–1947 in the Journal of Interamerican Studies and World Affairs, Vol. 26, No. 1 (Feb., 1984), pp. 69–95

Diplomatic posts
Preceded by William Dawson	United States Ambassador to Colombia; 1939 – 1942	Succeeded by Arthur Bliss Lane
Preceded by George S. Messersmith	United States Ambassador to Cuba; 1942 – 1945	Succeeded by R. Henry Norweb
Preceded by Norman Armour	United States Ambassador to Argentina; 1945	Succeeded by George S. Messersmith
Government offices
Preceded by Nelson Rockefeller	Assistant Secretary of State for American Republic Affairs; October 29, 1945 – June 27, 1947	Succeeded by Edward G. Miller, Jr.
