= Bureau of Emerging Threats =

U.S. State Department bureau

- Seal of the United States Department of State

Bureau overview
- Formed: March 23, 2026; 5 months ago
- Jurisdiction: Federal government of the United States
- Headquarters: Harry S Truman Building, Washington, D.C., U.S.
- Bureau executive: Anny Vu, Senior Bureau Official, Assistant Secretary of State for Emerging Threats
- Parent Bureau: United States Department of State
- Website: www.state.gov/bureaus-offices/under-secretary-for-arms-control-and-international-security-affairs/bureau-of-emerging-threats

The Bureau of Emerging Threats (ET) is a bureau of the United States Department of State that was established to counter rising national security threats related to cybersecurity, artificial intelligence risks, and hybrid warfare. The bureau reports to the Under Secretary of State for Arms Control and International Security.

== History ==
The Bureau of Emerging Threats was first announced in April 2025 as part of a broader State Department reorganization under Secretary of State Marco Rubio.

The bureau was formally established in March 2026. According to officials, the bureau is tasked with safeguarding U.S. national security against cyberattacks, threats to critical infrastructure, the weaponization of space, and the misuse of emerging technologies.

A State Department spokesperson said "the Bureau of Emerging Threats (ET) was created so the Department could better anticipate and respond to our adversaries’ efforts to use technology to threaten core American interests. U.S. adversaries develop and deploy advanced technologies in new and disruptive ways; ET will anticipate and address these threats." State Department Deputy Spokesperson Tommy Pigott said the bureau "will address not only the current threats we face today in cyberspace, outer space, and critical infrastructure but those we will face in the decades ahead."

== Organizational structure ==
The bureau is led by an Assistant Secretary of State (or Senior Bureau Official), one principal deputy assistant secretary, and at least two deputy assistant secretaries. State Department officials said the Bureau of Emerging Threats will include five divisions:

- Office of Cybersecurity
- Office of Critical Infrastructure Security
- Office of Disruptive Technology
- Office of Space Security
- Office of Threat Assessment

== See also ==
- Critical infrastructure
- Cybersecurity and Infrastructure Security Agency
- Emerging technologies
- Existential risk from artificial intelligence
- Hybrid warfare
