= Alvey A. Adee =

American diplomat (1842–1924)

Alvey Augustus Adee
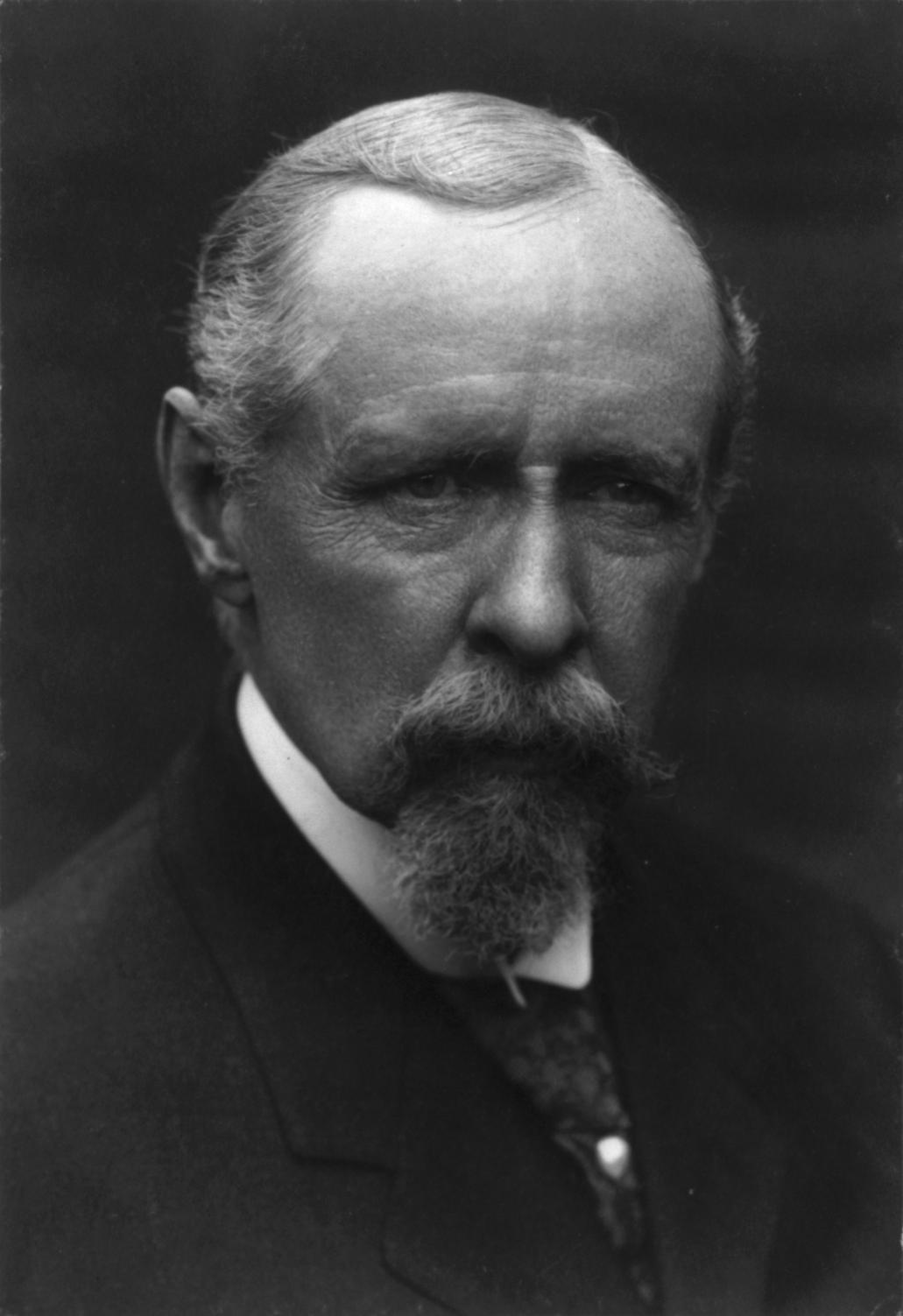
- Adee, c. 1908

2nd United States Second Assistant Secretary of State
- In office August 3, 1886 – June 30, 1924
- President: See list: Grover Cleveland; Benjamin Harrison; William McKinley; Theodore Roosevelt; William Howard Taft; Woodrow Wilson; Warren G. Harding; Calvin Coolidge
- Preceded by: William Hunter
- Succeeded by: Position abolished

Acting United States Secretary of State
- In office September 17, 1898 – September 29, 1898
- President: William McKinley
- Preceded by: William R. Day
- Succeeded by: John Hay

Personal details
- Born: November 27, 1842 Astoria, New York, U.S.
- Died: July 4, 1924 (aged 81) Washington D.C., U.S.
- Resting place: Oak Hill Cemetery; Washington, D.C., U.S.
- Profession: Diplomat

Alvey Augustus Adee (November 27, 1842 – July 4, 1924) was a long-time official with the United States Department of State who served as the acting Secretary of State in 1898 during the Spanish–American War. He was the second of three senior State Department officials—the first being William Hunter and the third Wilbur J. Carr—whose overlapping careers provided continuity and good management in American foreign policy for over a century, from the administration of President Andrew Jackson until that of Franklin D. Roosevelt.

== Early years ==
Adee was born at Astoria, New York, November 27, 1842, son of Amelia Kinnaird Graham and Augustus Alvey Adee, fleet surgeon in the U.S. navy. His siblings are George, Willie, William and David Graham Adee.

Adee was educated under private tutors. A native of Queens, New York City, he got his start in diplomacy by becoming the private secretary of Daniel Sickles, whom Adee accompanied to Madrid when Sickles was named the U.S. Minister to Spain in 1869. While in Madrid, Adee met and was befriended by John Hay, who was then the Secretary of the U.S. Legation there. Adee was appointed the position at Madrid, on September 9, 1870, where he served as chargé d'affaires several times.

== Career ==
Adee stayed at the Legation in Madrid for eight years, then returned to the United States to take a temporary secretary position in Washington, D.C., with the State Department on July 9, 1877, and a year later, on June 11, 1878, he was named the Chief of the department's Diplomatic Bureau. On July 18, 1882, he was promoted to Third Assistant Secretary, and on August 3, 1886, he was promoted again to Second Assistant Secretary, a position he held until his death 38 years later.

He received the honorary degree of A.M. from Yale University in 1888. The apex of Adee's career came during the Spanish–American War in 1898. The Secretary of State, John Sherman, was old and in poor health, and the Assistant Secretary of State, William R. Day, was inexperienced in diplomacy, which meant that Adee, as the third-ranking officer in the department, effectively supervised U.S. diplomacy during the war. Adee was mostly deaf, prompting one diplomat to quip: "The head of the Department knows nothing; the First Assistant says nothing; the Second Assistant hears nothing." With both Sherman and Day having left the department, from September 17 to 29 of that year, Adee became acting Secretary of State in name as well as fact for two weeks, until John Hay returned from England to take over as the new Secretary.

Adee was again in effective charge of the State Department during the Boxer Rebellion in August and September, 1900, because Hay was ill and the Assistant Secretary David Jayne Hill was away from Washington.

== Last years ==
After 1909, Adee's influence (and health) steadily waned, though he was allowed to remain as Second Assistant Secretary. He continued to work until his death on July 4, 1924, at his residence, 1019 Fifteenth Street Northwest. He is buried at Oak Hill Cemetery in Washington, D.C.

Adee never married and fathered no children. He was well known for his annual summer bicycling trips through Europe, which he continued until the outbreak of the First World War, and on which he was usually accompanied by Alexander Montgomery Thackara, American consul general at Berlin and later Paris, and his wife Eleanor, daughter of General William Tecumseh Sherman.

== Legacy ==
Adee is said to be a major influence on characterization of Nero Wolfe by Rex Stout according to the latter's official biographer John J. McAleer. Adee being a scholar, sleuth, gourmet, bachelor, a model of efficiency, a master of the English language is said to have inspired the characterization of Wolfe.

Government offices
Preceded by Walker Blaine	Third Assistant Secretary of State; July 18, 1882 – August 5, 1886	Succeeded by John Bassett Moore
Preceded by William Hunter	United States Second Assistant Secretary of State; August 3, 1886 – June 30, 1924	Succeeded by post abolished
