= James Cabell Bruce =

American diplomat and businessman (1892-1980)

His Excellency James Cabell Bruce

29th United States Ambassador to Argentina
- In office July 12, 1947 – August 20, 1949
- Appointed by: Harry S. Truman
- Preceded by: George S. Messersmith
- Succeeded by: Stanton Griffis

Personal details
- Born: December 23, 1892 Baltimore, Maryland, U.S.
- Died: July 17, 1980 (aged 87) New York City, New York, U.S.
- Spouse: Ellen McHenry Keyser (m. 1919; died 1980)
- Relations: David K. E. Bruce (brother); Thomas Nelson Page (uncle)
- Children: 2
- Parent(s): William Cabell Bruce; Louise Este Fisher
- Education: Gilman School
- Alma mater: Princeton University; University of Maryland

James Cabell Bruce (December 23, 1892 – July 17, 1980) was a 20th-century American businessman and banker in New York City and Baltimore, who served as U.S. ambassador to Argentina in the 1940s.

== Background ==
James Cabell Bruce was born on December 23, 1892, in Baltimore, Maryland, son of William Cabell Bruce (a lawyer, author, and U. S. Senator) and Louise Este Fisher and brother of David K. E. Bruce.

He studied at the Gilman School in Baltimore. He attended Princeton University, from which he graduated in 1914 with a BA in literature. In 1918, Bruce received a law degree from the University of Maryland, Baltimore.

== Career ==
In 1915, Bruce trained with the U.S. Army at Plattsburgh, New York. In 1916, he worked in Rome as secretary to U.S. Ambassador to Italy (and uncle) Thomas Nelson Page. In 1917, he enlisted in the U. S. Army. He served in France and Germany, then took time off to complete his law degree. In 1919, he served as a military attache at the U.S. Embassy in Rome. From there, he traveled to the Balkans to investigate Albania and Montenegro for the Paris Peace Conference.

In 1919, Bruce worked for the Mercantile Trust Bank of Baltimore and for the Atlantic Trust Company. In 1926, Bruce moved to New York, where he worked for banks including Chase National. In 1931, he moved back to Baltimore as president of the Baltimore Trust Company.

In 1933, he became financial advisor to the Homeowners Loan Corporation in Washington, DC. In 1934, he became vice president of the National Dairy Products Corporation.

He also became a director of several large businesses, including: American Airlines, the Maryland Casualty Company, Republic Steel, the American Shipbuilding Company, and Lowe's Theatres.

=== U.S. Ambassador to Argentina ===
In 1947, Bruce became U.S. ambassador to Argentina. He returned to the U.S. to campaign for President Truman. In 1949, Bruce resigned so he could become U.S. ambassador to Great Britain. However, Truman withdrew his offer, since brother David Bruce was already in line as U.S. ambassador to France. Instead, he became director of the Mutual Defense Assistance Program, a forerunner of NATO.

While ambassador, Bruce received a letter from attorney William L. Marbury, Jr., dated December 28, 1948. In the letter, Marbury states, "there have been new developments in this case which would put to shame any respectable author of a detective story." The letter formed part of correspondence: "this case" refers to the case of Alger Hiss (Marbury's client).).

Diplomatic posts
Preceded by George S. Messersmith	United States Ambassador to Argentina; 1947–1949	Succeeded by Stanton Griffis

=== Later life ===
In 1950, Bruce returned to business. His 1958 bid for United States Senate failed.

== Personal and death ==
On May 24, 1919, Bruce married Ellen McHenry Keyser. They had two daughters: Ellen (1920-1998) and Louise (1924-2013).

He died on July 17, 1980, in New York City; his wife had preceded him on February 5, 1980.

== Works ==
- College Journalism with James Forrestal (1914)
- Those Perplexing Argentines (New York: Longmans, Green, 1953)
- Memoirs (Baltimore: Gateway Press, 2004)

== See also ==
- United States Ambassador to Argentina
- William Cabell Bruce
- David K. E. Bruce
