= Ambrose Dudley Mann =

American diplomat

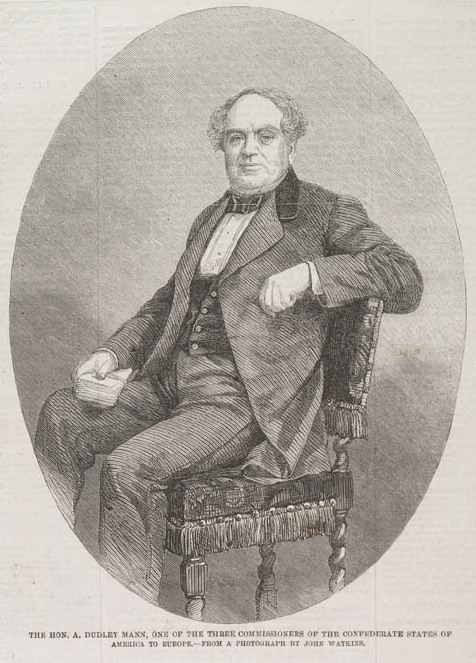

1st United States Assistant Secretary of State
- In office March 23, 1853 – May 8, 1855
- President: Franklin Pierce
- Preceded by: Office established
- Succeeded by: William Hunter

Personal details
- Born: April 26, 1801 Hanover Courthouse, Virginia, U.S.
- Died: November 15, 1889 (aged 88) France

Ambrose Dudley Mann (April 26, 1801 – November 15, 1889) was the first United States Assistant Secretary of State and a commissioner for the Confederate States of America.

== Early life ==
Mann was born on April 26, 1801, in Hanover Courthouse, Virginia. He studied at the United States Military Academy but left before he graduated.

== U.S. government service ==
He later became U.S. consul to Bremen in 1842 and was appointed to negotiate commercial treaties with Hanover, Oldenburg, and Mecklenburg in 1845 as well as all the German states except Prussia in 1847. In 1849, he became commissioner to Hungary and in 1850, he became U.S. Consul to Switzerland, where he negotiated a reciprocity treaty. He then returned to the United States, where he was appointed as the first Assistant Secretary of State in 1853; he served until 1855.

== Civil War ==
During the American Civil War, he sided with the Confederacy and devoted himself especially to the development of the material interests of its states. On March 16, 1861, Confederate President Jefferson Davis and Secretary of State Robert Toombs appointed Mann, William Lowndes Yancey and Pierre Adolphe Rost the first Confederate commissioners to Europe. The three sailed on March 31, 1861. Mann eventually received the title Commissioner of the Confederate States of America for Belgium and the Vatican. Yancey and Rost were later replaced by John Slidell and James Murray Mason, the two subjects of the Trent Affair.

== Later life ==
Mann spent the latter part of his life living in France where he had an apartment in Paris and a country house in Chantilly. He wrote his memoirs, which were available to read by 1888. Mann died in France in 1889, the exact date of his death (Nov. 15, 1889) being announced in the Nov. 16, 1889 issue of the French newspaper Journal des Debats. After a delay of about 6 weeks, Mann was finally interred on January 2, 1890, in the Montparnasse Cemetery, in Paris.

Political offices
Preceded by (none)	United States Assistant Secretary of State; March 23, 1853 – May 8, 1855	Succeeded by William Hunter
