= Battle of Owyhee River =

1866 Snake War battle in California

- Part of the Indian Wars, Snake War
Date	26 December 1866
Location	Malheur County, Oregon
Result	U.S. victory

Belligerents
United States	Paiute

Commanders and leaders
George Crook	Howluck (Big Foot)

Strength
1 Company, 1st U.S. Cavalry	~90

Casualties and losses
1 wounded 1 mortally wounded	30 killed 7 captured

The Battle of Owyhee River took place during the Snake War in 1866 in response to Paiute attacks along the Owyhee River earlier that year.

== Background ==
Lt. Col. George Crook had recently arrived to assume command of the District of Boise in November, 1866. Crook set out with one company from the 1st U.S. Cavalry on December 18. Bad weather, rough terrain, growing opposition from his own ranks and unreliable guides all plagued Crook from the start. Yet, Crook pushed on until he reached the Paiute camp of Chief Howluck (Bigfoot) along the Owyhee River in southeast Oregon.

== Battle ==
On the morning of December 26, Crook's men caught the Paiutes asleep in their camp. However, after the first shots were fired, Chief Howluck determined to stay and fight. The native warriors taunted the soldiers, who returned a deadly accurate fire on the warriors. Quickly into the fighting almost every mounted warrior was shot down. The rest sought refuge behind rocks, remaining there until mid-day when they retreated.

== Aftermath ==
Crook had caused considerable damage to Howluck's warriors. 30 were killed and another 7 captured. Crook lost 1 man wounded and another mortally wounded. Crook commented the battle "...ended any more depredations from that band". Among the native horses and stores captured was a Wells Fargo mail pouch lost in the earlier Paiute raid. Crook did not immediately return to Boise, but continued his expedition engaging the Paiutes again at the Battle of Steen's Mountain.
