= Taylorsville, Ohio =

- Unincorporated community
- Location within Ohio Location within the United States
- Coordinates: 39°04′38″N 83°44′3″W
- Country: United States
- State: Ohio
- County: Highland
- Township: Whiteoak
- Elevation: 1,109 ft (338 m)
- Time zone: UTC-5 (Eastern (EST))
  - Summer (DST): UTC-4 (EDT)
- ZIP codes: 45133
- GNIS feature ID: 1063053

Taylorsville is an unincorporated community in Highland County, in the U.S. state of Ohio.

== History ==
Taylorsville was laid out in 1846, and named after the local Taylor family. A post office called New Corwin was established in 1849, the name was changed to Taylorsville in 1897, and the post office closed in 1935.

On May 8, 1961, an F1 tornado struck Taylorsville.

== Education ==
Taylorsville is served by the Bright Local School District.

== Notable people ==
- Charles Burckhalter, director of the Chabot Observatory and astronomer.
- Wilbur J. Carr, diplomat
- George Crook, United States Army officer who served in the American Civil War and the Indian Wars.
