= George S. Messersmith =

American diplomat (1883-1960)

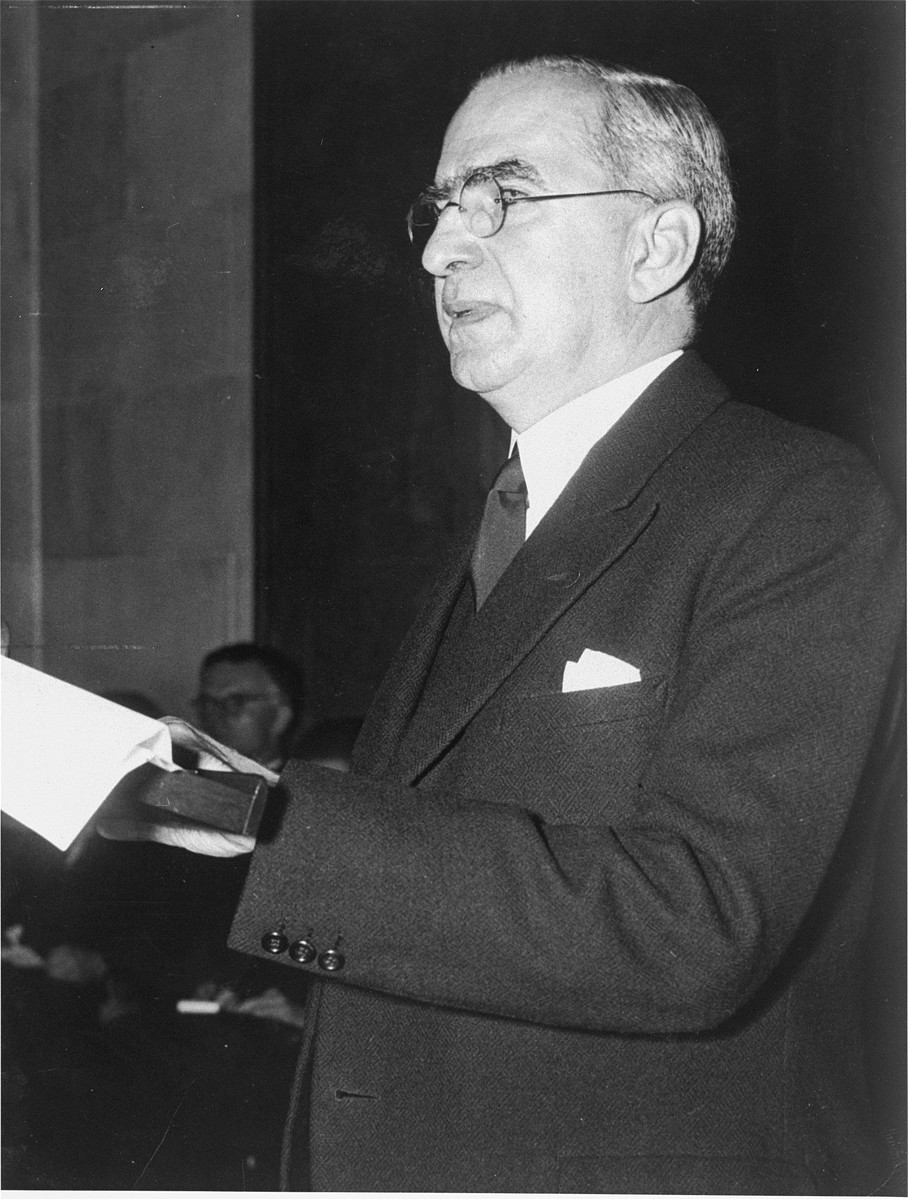
- Messersmith in 1938

28th United States Ambassador to Argentina
- In office April 12, 1946 – June 12, 1947
- President: Harry S. Truman
- Preceded by: Spruille Braden
- Succeeded by: James Cabell Bruce

United States Ambassador to Mexico
- In office February 24, 1942 – May 15, 1946
- President: Franklin D. Roosevelt; Harry S. Truman
- Preceded by: Josephus Daniels
- Succeeded by: Walter C. Thurston

United States Ambassador to Cuba
- In office March 8, 1940 – February 8, 1942
- President: Franklin D. Roosevelt
- Preceded by: J. Butler Wright
- Succeeded by: Spruille Braden

United States Assistant Secretary of State
- In office July 9, 1937 – February 15, 1940
- President: Franklin D. Roosevelt
- Preceded by: Sumner Welles
- Succeeded by: Hugh R. Wilson

27th United States Ambassador to Austria-Hungary
- In office April 7, 1934 – July 11, 1937
- President: Franklin D. Roosevelt
- Preceded by: George Howard Earle III
- Succeeded by: Grenville T. Emmet

Personal details
- Born: George Strausser Messersmith; October 3, 1883 Fleetwood, Pennsylvania, U.S.
- Died: January 29, 1960 (aged 76)
- Profession: Lawyer, Diplomat

George Strausser Messersmith (October 3, 1883 – January 29, 1960) was a United States ambassador to Austria, Cuba, Mexico, and Argentina. Messersmith also served as head of the consulate in Germany from 1930 to 1934, during the rise of the Nazi Party.

He was best known in his day for his controversial decision to issue a visa to Albert Einstein to travel to the United States. He is also known today for his diplomatic handling of Edward VIII and Wallis Simpson, later Duke and Duchess of Windsor, in the era before World War II.

== Education and early career ==
Messersmith, a graduate of Keystone State Normal School, was a teacher and then school administrator from 1900 to 1914. Then, he entered the foreign service and left his position as vice president of the Delaware State Board of Education to become US consul in Fort Erie, Ontario.

After serving as a US consul at Curacao (1916–1919) and Antwerp (1919–1925), he became US Consul General for Belgium and Luxembourg in 1925. He served as US Consul General in Buenos Aires, Argentina, from 1928 to 1930.

== Consul for Berlin ==
In 1930, Messersmith left his position in Argentina to accept the same position in Berlin. There, he became responsible for administering the annual quota of Germans permitted to migrate to the United States.

While he did not personally interview Albert Einstein, Messersmith cleared the way for the scientist to leave Germany. He called Einstein himself to tell him that his visa would be ready. Messersmith received significant notoriety in late 1932 due to the incident.

Messersmith told the American consuls in Europe that refugees or immigrants requesting a visa to enter the US had to have sufficient funds and property to support themselves.

As America's consul general in Berlin in 1933, Messersmith wrote a dispatch to the State Department that dramatically contravened the popular view that Hitler had no consensus among the German people and would not remain in power:

I wish it were really possible to make our people at home understand how definitely this martial spirit is being developed in Germany. If this government remains in power for another year, and it carries on in the measure in this direction, it will go far toward making Germany a danger to world peace for years to come. With few exceptions, the men who are running the government are of a mentality that you and I cannot understand. Some of them are psychopathic cases and would ordinarily be receiving treatment somewhere."

== Minister to Austria ==
His service in Germany ended in February 1934, when President Franklin Roosevelt nominated him to be US Ambassador to Uruguay, only to renominate him the next month as Minister to Austria before his service in Uruguay could begin.

On January 17, 1935, Edward Albert (later Edward VIII), the Prince of Wales, was visiting Vienna on vacation with his new mistress, Wallis Simpson. While Simpson went shopping, Edward met with President Wilhelm Miklas and Chancellor Kurt Schuschnigg of Austria. Messersmith had spies at the meeting who reported to the State Department through him on the meeting's goal: solidifying the Balkan Pact.

Messersmith "deplored the American Olympic Committee's decision to go to Berlin," for the 1936 Summer Olympics.

When Edward VIII abdicated in December 1936, he visited Messersmith, who spied on him, in Vienna and made "what amounted to a detailed watching brief on the duke." They became friends, even attending Christmas Day services together later that month.

Messersmith continued to socialize with Edward, attending a concert by soprano Joan Hammond on February 3, 1937. That month, Edward confided in him that the Earl of Harewood, his brother-in-law, had treated him "shabbily." After the Duke and the Duchess of Windsor were married in June 1937, they honeymooned in Austria, and Simpson confided to Messersmith about her bitterness towards the American media.

In return, Messersmith accidentally leaked through them that the Americans knew that Nazi Germany and Fascist Italy had secret connections as early as that month. When Messersmith returned to Washington, D.C., in August 1937, he informed the British authorities that the Windsors had Nazi connections, which "would seriously affect the Windsors' entire future."

== ASoS under Roosevelt ==
In July 1937, Messersmith departed Austria and became US Assistant Secretary of State July 9, 1937 – February 15, 1940. As chief of the Foreign Service Promotion Board, Messersmith had to go over all appointments with President Roosevelt and in the process learned that Roosevelt had excellent intelligence on several foreign service officers with problems, including alcohol or affairs.

== Diplomatic Career in Latin America 1940-1947 ==
At his several posts in Latin America, Messersmith was a staunch supporter of Roosevelt's "Good Neighbor Policy," balancing a Pan-American diplomatic approach with the need to respect the individual needs and dignity of the countries he was working with.

- In March 1940, he replaced J. Butler Wright as United States Ambassador to Cuba, a position he would hold until February 1942.
- In February 1942, he replaced Josephus Daniels as United States Ambassador to Mexico, serving both the Roosevelt administration and the Truman administration.
- In April/May 1946, Messersmith left Walter C. Thurston in charge of Mexico and replaced Spruille Braden as United States Ambassador to Argentina, a posoition he would hold until June 1947.

=== Cuba ===
While Messersmith served as United States Ambassador Extraordinary and Plenipotentiary to Cuba, he wrote a report on March 4, 1941, about the Windsors' friend, James D. Mooney, and was critical of the General Motors executive's opinions against England. He considered that Mooney was "dangerous... for the Duke and Duchess of Windsor to be associated with." However, the Windsors visited Mooney in Detroit in November 1941, the month before the attack on Pearl Harbor.

=== Mexico ===
Later, he was appointed United States Ambassador to Mexico, where he passed on information about the Windsors' Nazi connections to Assistant Secretary of State Adolph A. Berle. Messersmith "no longer adhered to his moderate view of the duke and duchess.". During his tenure, in 1942, he helped establish the Biblioteca Benjamín Franklin (Benjamin Franklin Library) in Mexico City and The American Society of Mexico, an umbrella group to help coordinate the whole American community in Mexico.

Following the forced resignation of Under Secretary of State Sumner Welles in 1943, Messersmith, then Ambassador to Mexico, was rumored to be on a short list of candidates to succeed him, but Roosevelt instead selected future Secretary of State Edward Stettinius, Jr.

=== Argentina ===
In Argentina, Messersmith replaced Spruille Braden who had left the previous September to become Assistant Secretary of State for Latin American affairs. His focus was to abolish Nazi influence in the country and to work towards defense agreements with Argentina.

== Retirement ==
In 1945, Spruille Braden served as Assistant Secretary of State for Western Hemisphere Affairs under Harry Truman. He clashed with Messersmith former ambassador to Mexico, with whom he had many disagreements about foreign policy in Latin America. The disagreement with Braden would eventually force Messersmith out of the foreign service. (Beginning in 1948, Braden was a paid lobbyist for the United Fruit Company. When the company's interests were threatened in Guatemala by President Jacobo Arbenz Guzmán, Braden helped to conceive and execute the 1954 coup d'état that overthrew him. )

Messersmith left his post in Argentina in 1947 and retired from the Foreign Service. His administrative abilities having been recognized, he was offered the position of Chairman of the Board of Mexican Light and Power Company, and served successfully in that capacity until his retirement from the Company in 1955. He died in Mexico in 1960.

== Legacy ==
George S. Messersmith speech, October 1938

Messersmith's collection of papers has been digitized and made available to researchers by the University of Delaware. The digitization project was made possible through a grant from the National Historical Publications and Records Commission (NHPRC).

Diplomatic posts
Preceded by George Howard Earle III	United States Minister to Austria; April 7, 1934–July 11, 1937	Succeeded by Grenville T. Emmet
Preceded by J. Butler Wright	United States Ambassador to Cuba; March 8, 1940-February 8, 1942	Succeeded by Spruille Braden
Preceded by Josephus Daniels	United States Ambassador to Mexico; February 24, 1942–May 15, 1946	Succeeded by Walter C. Thurston
Preceded by Spruille Braden	United States Ambassador to Argentina; May 23, 1946–June 12, 1947	Succeeded by James Cabell Bruce
