= Battle of Steen's Mountain =

1867 battle of the Snake War

- Part of the Indian Wars, Snake War
Date	29 January 1867
Location	Burns Junction, Oregon
Result	U.S. victory

Belligerents
United States	Paiute

Commanders and leaders
George Crook	Paunina

Strength
1st U.S. Cavalry	~90

Casualties and losses
1 civilian scout killed 1 civilian scout wounded 3 soldiers wounded	60 killed 27 captured

The Battle of Steen's Mountain was a battle during the Snake War. In response to Paiute attacks in Idaho, Lt. Col. George Crook led a punitive expedition into southeast Oregon, defeating Chief Howluck at the Battle of Owyhee River. Continuing his pursuit, Crook again encountered the Chief Paunina's Paiute village at Steen's Mountain. As Crook ordered the charge, his horse bolted and carried him through the native village. Nevertheless, his men followed. Despite several close calls for Crook personally, his troopers' fire was accurate and inflicted heavy casualties. A month later Crook's men engaged in one final skirmish before Crook ended the expedition due to bad weather.
