= Assistant Secretary of State for Emerging Threats =

U.S. diplomatic position

United States Assistant Secretary of State for Emerging Threats
- Seal of the United States Department of State

- Flag of an Assistant Secretary of State

- Incumbent; Joshua Young; Senior Bureau Official since October 2, 2026
- Reports to: Under Secretary of State for Arms Control and International Security
- Nominator: President of the United States
- Formation: March 23, 2026
- Website: Official website

The United States assistant secretary of state for emerging threats is the head of the Bureau of Emerging Threats at the U.S. Department of State. The Assistant Secretary of State for Emerging Threats reports to the Under Secretary of State for Arms Control and International Security. In March 2026, Bureau of Emerging Threats has been tasked with safeguarding American national security against cyberattacks, the weaponization of space and similar malicious efforts, they said.

== Assistant Secretaries of State for Emerging Threats ==
#	Name	Assumed office	Left office	President(s) served under
-	Anny Vu (acting)	September 29, 2025	October 2, 2026	Donald Trump
-	Joshua Young (acting)	October 2, 2026	Present	Donald Trump
