= J. Butler Wright =

American diplomat (1877–1939)

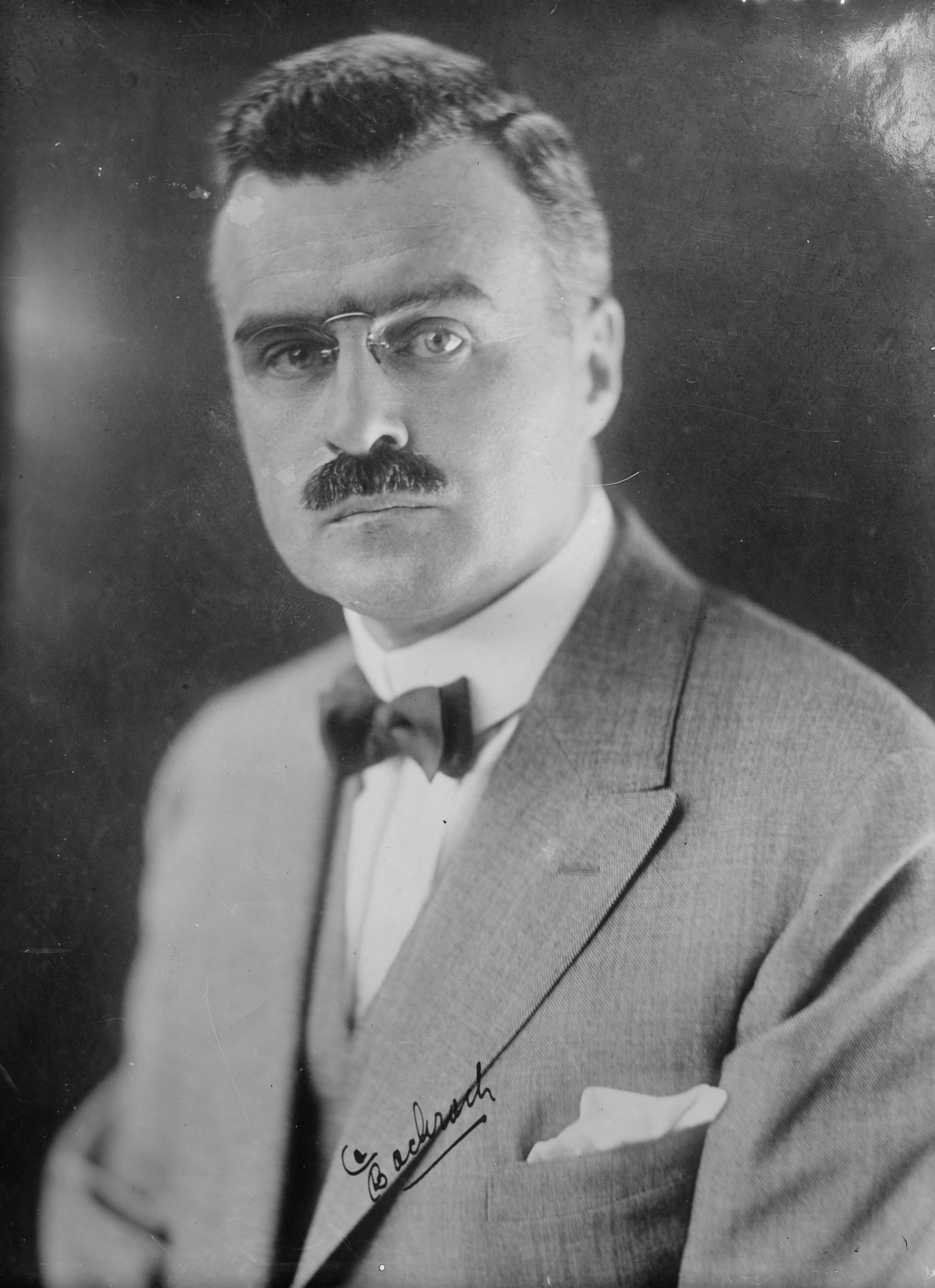

Third Assistant Secretary of State
- In office June 11, 1923 – June 30, 1924
- Preceded by: Robert Wood Bliss
- Succeeded by: office abolished

United States Ambassador to Cuba
- In office August 23, 1937 – December 4, 1939
- Preceded by: Jefferson Caffery
- Succeeded by: George S. Messersmith

United States Envoy to Czechoslovakia
- In office October 25, 1934 – June 1, 1937
- Preceded by: Francis White
- Succeeded by: Wilbur J. Carr

United States Envoy to Uruguay
- In office February 9, 1931 – July 10, 1934
- Preceded by: Leland Harrison
- Succeeded by: Julius G. Lay

United States Envoy to Hungary
- In office June 18, 1927 – October 24, 1930
- Preceded by: Theodore Brentano
- Succeeded by: Nicholas Roosevelt

Personal details
- Born: October 18, 1877 Irvington, New York, U.S.
- Died: December 4, 1939 (aged 62) Havana, Cuba
- Resting place: Washington National Cathedral
- Education: Princeton University (B.S.)

Joshua Butler Wright (October 18, 1877 – December 4, 1939) was a United States diplomat who served as representative of the US in Hungary, Uruguay, Czechoslovakia, and Cuba. He was the twentieth and last Third Assistant Secretary of State.

Wright was born in Irvington, in Westchester County, New York, on 18 October 1877, the son of C. R. Wright. He attended the Lawrenceville School and then Princeton University, graduating with a B.S. degree in 1899. Wright worked as a banker in New York City from 1899 to 1906 and served in the New York National Guard from 1901 to 1907. He married Maude A. Wolfe of Tuxedo Park, in June 1902.

In 1907, Wright became a rancher in Wyoming. While living in Cody, Wyoming, he passed the foreign service examination on May 17, 1909, and became a career diplomat. His first posting was in Honduras. Wright later served in Belgium, Brazil, Russia and the United Kingdom. In May 1916, he married Harriet R. Southerland, the daughter of retired Rear Admiral William H. H. Southerland, in Washington, D.C. Wright and his second wife had two daughters.

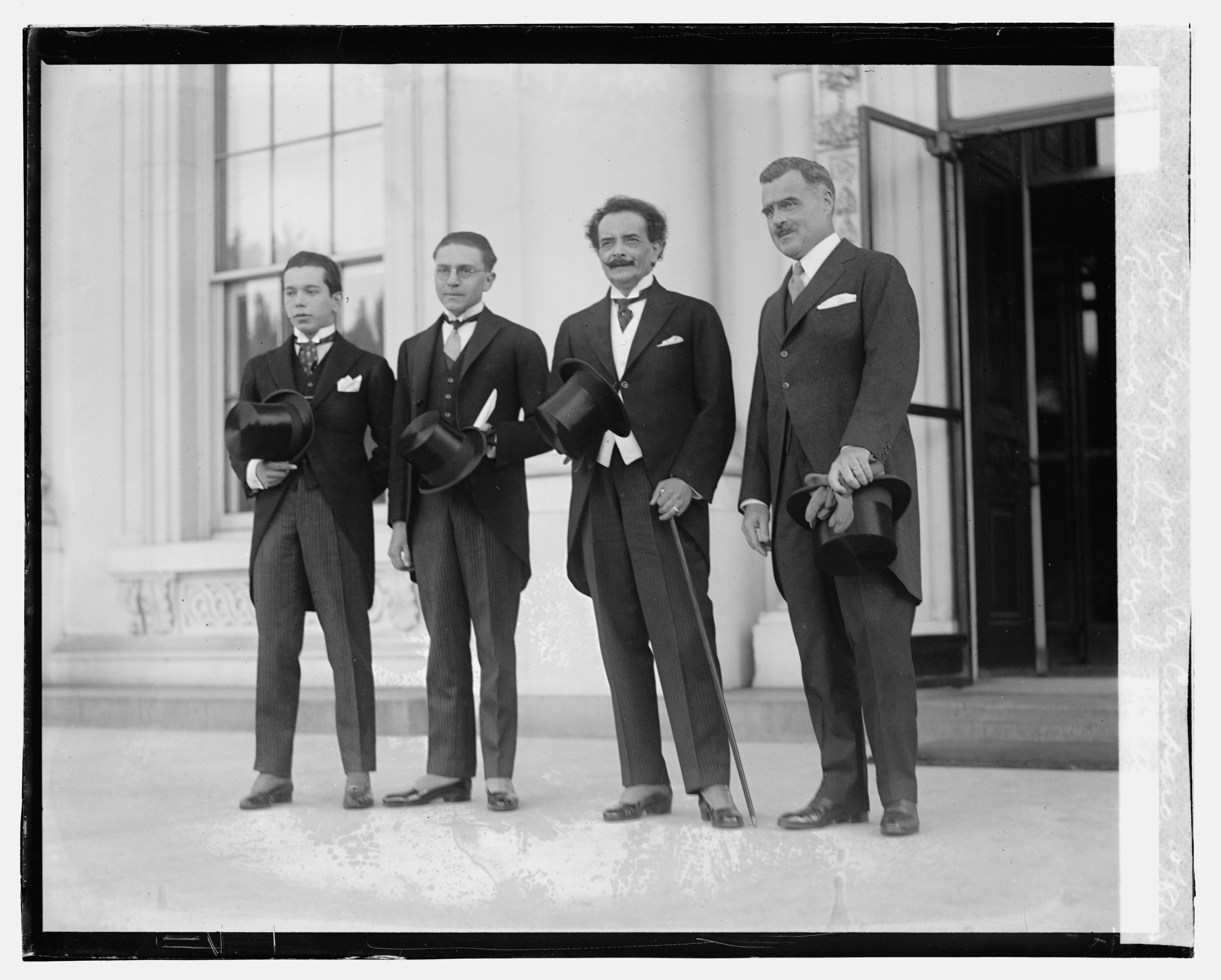
Butler Right with a diplomatic delegation.

In 1925, Wright was serving as Assistant Secretary of State under president Calvin Coolidge and Secretary of State Charles Evans Hughes.

Coolidge appointed Wright to serve as Envoy to Hungary in 1927. Herbert Hoover appointed Wright as Envoy to Uruguay in 1930, and Franklin D. Roosevelt appointed Wright as envoy to Czechoslovakia in 1934, and afterwards as the U.S. ambassador to Cuba from 1937 to 1939. During his stint as ambassador to Cuba, the SS St. Louis with its cargo of mostly German Jewish refugees tried to land in Havana in 1939. This incident was the basis for the 1976 film Voyage of the Damned.

Wright died at his post in Havana on December 4, 1939, after an operation. His remains were returned to the United States at the Washington Navy Yard aboard the cruiser USS Omaha. He was interred at the Washington National Cathedral on December 11, 1939.

Government offices
Preceded by Robert Wood Bliss	Third Assistant Secretary of State; June 11, 1923 – June 30, 1924	Succeeded by Office Abolished
Diplomatic posts
Preceded by Theodore Brentano	United States Envoy to Hungary; June 18, 1927 – October 24, 1930	Succeeded by Nicholas Roosevelt
Preceded by Leland Harrison	United States Envoy to Uruguay; February 9, 1931 – July 10, 1934	Succeeded by Julius G. Lay
Preceded by Francis White	United States Envoy to Czechoslovakia; October 25, 1934 – June 1, 1937	Succeeded by Wilbur J. Carr
Preceded by Jefferson Caffery	United States Ambassador to Cuba; August 23, 1937 – December 4, 1939	Succeeded by George S. Messersmith
