= John Addison Thomas =

American politician (1810–1858)

3rd United States Assistant Secretary of State
- In office November 1, 1855 – April 3, 1857
- President: Franklin Pierce; James Buchanan
- Preceded by: William Hunter
- Succeeded by: John Appleton

Personal details
- Born: May 28, 1810 Cabarrus County, North Carolina, U.S.
- Died: March 26, 1858 (aged 47) Paris, France
- Spouse: Catherine Ronalds (m. 1844–1858)
- Children: 4
- Parent(s): Isaac Jetton Thomas; Asenath Houston
- Relatives: James Houston Thomas (brother)
- Education: United States Military Academy

John Addison Thomas (May 28, 1810 – March 26, 1858) was an American engineer and military officer who served in the United States Army, and later served as United States Assistant Secretary of State.

== Early life ==
Thomas was born in Cabarrus County, North Carolina on May 28, 1810 and grew up on the family plantation in Columbia, Tennessee. He was the son of Isaac Jetton Thomas and Asenath (née Houston) Thomas. His older brother was James Houston Thomas (1808–1876), a member of the U.S. House of Representatives from Tennessee's 6th district.

He graduated at the United States Military Academy in 1833.

== Career ==
Upon his graduation from West Point, he was assigned to the 3rd artillery, served in garrison and as assistant instructor of infantry tactics and became 2nd lieutenant on December 1, 1835 and 1st lieutenant on June 30, 1837. From 1840 to 1841 he was assistant professor of geography, history and ethics at West Point and from 1842 to 1845 he was commandant of cadets and instructor of infantry tactics. He was made captain on November 19, 1843 and resigned on May 28, 1846 to practice law in New York City, New York. On July 23, 1846, he became colonel of the 4th New York regiment which had been raised for the war with Mexico, but was not mustered into service.

Thomas was chief engineer of New York state in 1853 to 1854 and from April 19, 1853 to January 14, 1854 was advocate of the United States in London, England under the convention of February 8, 1853 with Great Britain for the adjustment of American claims. From November 1, 1855 to April 3, 1857 he was United States Assistant Secretary of State, serving under U.S. Secretary of State William L. Marcy and, later, Lewis Cass, in Washington, D.C. He gained reputation by his report of the convention with Great Britain and by other state papers.

== Personal life ==
In 1844, Thomas was married to Catherine Ronalds (1820–1885), the daughter of Maria Dorothea Lorillard (1790–1848) and Thomas Alexander Ronalds (1788–1835), a New York merchant. Eleanora was the granddaughter of Pierre Lorillard II, the head of the Lorillard Tobacco Company, and a cousin of Catharine Lorillard Wolfe. Her sister, Eleanora Lorillard Ronalds, was married to U.S. Representative Frederick A. Conkling. They were the parents of:

- Addison Thomas (1845–1908), who married Alice Gridley Abbott (1850–1874), daughter of James Alexander Abbott. After her death, he married Susan Cox (b. 1839), daughter of Rev. Samuel Hanson Cox.
- Ronald Thomas (1847–1923), who married Daisy Richards (1857–1900), daughter of Dr. John Custis Richards, in 1881. They lived at "The Roses" in Santa Barbara, California. After her death in 1900, he married Julia Hayes Percy in 1902.
- Catherine Lorillard Thomas (1850–1934), who married Ernest Christian de La Haye, Viscount d'Anglemont (d. 1885) in 1869.
- George Lorillard Thomas (b. 1851), an attorney, who married Nora Clayton Thomas, his cousin and the daughter of James Houston Thomas, a member of the Confederate Congress.

Thomas died in Paris, France, on March 26, 1858.

== Notes ==
Political offices
Preceded by William Hunter	United States; Assistant Secretary of State; November 1, 1855 – April 3, 1857	Succeeded by John Appleton
