= William Dawson (diplomat) =

United States diplomat

William Dawson Jr.

1st United States Ambassador to the Organization of American States
- In office May 18, 1948 – July 20, 1948
- President: Harry S. Truman
- Preceded by: Diplomatic relations established
- Succeeded by: Paul C. Daniels

United States Ambassador to Uruguay
- In office July 12, 1941 – August 6, 1946
- President: Franklin D. Roosevelt; Harry S. Truman
- Preceded by: Edwin C. Wilson
- Succeeded by: Joseph F. McGurk

United States Ambassador to Panama
- In office July 14, 1939 – April 21, 1941
- President: Franklin D. Roosevelt
- Preceded by: Frank P. Corrigan
- Succeeded by: Edwin C. Wilson

Personal details
- Born: August 11, 1885 Saint Paul, Minnesota
- Died: July 3, 1972 (aged 86) Blue Hill, Maine
- Resting place: Washington, D.C.
- Spouse: Agnes Balloch Bready
- Education: University of Minnesota; Ecole Libre des Sciences Politiques

Wiliam Dawson Jr. (August 11, 1885 – July 3, 1972) was a career United States diplomat. He was U.S. ambassador to multiple countries, including being the first ambassador to the Organization of American States.

He was born at Saint Paul, Minnesota, on August 11, 1885, the son of William Dawson and Maria Rice. After graduating from the University of Minnesota in 1906, he attended the Ecole Libre des Sciences Politiques in Paris and soon after entered the United States Foreign Service.

His first posting was to St. Petersburg, Russia, in 1908. He served as vice and deputy consul-general to Barcelona, Spain, and Frankfurt, Germany; and consul at Rosario, Argentina; Montevideo, Uruguay; Danzig, Poland; and Munich, Germany.

Dawson was consul-general at large from 1922 to 1924 and served as chief instructor at the Department of State's Foreign Service School from 1925 to 1928. He married Agnes Balloch Bready on June 8, 1926.

He served in Mexico as consul-general; was U.S. Minister to Ecuador, Colombia and Uruguay; and U.S. ambassador to Panama and Uruguay during his long career.

After retiring in 1946 he served as advisor on Latin American affairs to the U.S. delegation during the formation of the United Nations, went to Brazil on a special mission with General George Marshall and became the first U.S. ambassador to the Organization of American States.

He died on July 3, 1972, at the Blue Hill Memorial Hospital, in Blue Hill, Maine. Following a private funeral service he was buried later at Washington, D.C.

Diplomatic posts
Preceded by Gerhard A. Bading	United States Minister to Ecuador; August 9, 1930 – February 27, 1935	Succeeded by Antonio C. Gonzalez
Preceded by Julius G. Lay	United States Minister to Uruguay; February 10, 1938 – June 6, 1939	Succeeded by Edwin C. Wilson
Preceded by Frank P. Corrigan	United States Ambassador to Panama; July 14, 1939 – April 21, 1941	Succeeded by Edwin C. Wilson
New title Mission in Montevideo upgraded to Embassy	United States Ambassador to Uruguay; July 12, 1941 – August 6, 1946	Succeeded by Joseph F. McGurk
