= United States Assistant Secretary of State =

High-ranking American diplomat

Assistant Secretary of State (A/S) is a title used for many executive positions in the United States Department of State, ranking below the under secretaries. A set of six assistant secretaries reporting to the under secretary of state for political affairs manage diplomatic missions within their designated geographic regions, plus one assistant secretary dealing with international organizations and one equivalent as the coordinator/ambassador at large for counterterrorism. Assistant secretaries usually manage individual bureaus of the Department of State. When the manager of a bureau or another agency holds a title other than assistant secretary, such as "director," it can be said to be of "assistant secretary equivalent rank." Assistant secretaries typically have a set of deputies, referred to as deputy assistant secretaries (DAS).

== History ==
From 1853 until 1913, the assistant secretary of state was the second-ranking official within the U.S. Department of State. Prior to 1853, the chief clerk was the second-ranking officer, and after 1913, the counselor was the second-ranking position, though the assistant secretary continued to be a position until 1924. From 1867, the assistant secretary of state was assisted by a second assistant secretary of state, and from 1875, by a third assistant secretary of state. Specific duties of the incumbents varied over the years and included such responsibilities as supervising the Diplomatic and Consular Bureaus, general supervision of correspondence, consular appointments, administration of the Department, and supervision of economic matters and various geographic divisions.

In 1968, Barbara M. Watson became the first woman and first African-American woman to serve as an assistant secretary of state when confirmed as the Assistant Secretary of State for Consular Affairs.

== Overview ==
Today, the title of the second-ranking position at the department is the deputy secretary of state, with the next tier of State Department officials bearing the rank of under secretary of state.

The following is a list of current offices bearing the title of "assistant secretary of state":

- Reporting directly to the secretary of state:
  - Assistant Secretary of State for Intelligence and Research
  - Assistant Secretary of State for Legislative Affairs
- Reporting to the under secretary of state for political affairs:
  - Assistant Secretary of State for African Affairs
  - Assistant Secretary of State for East Asian and Pacific Affairs
  - Assistant Secretary of State for European and Eurasian Affairs
  - Assistant Secretary of State for International Organization Affairs
  - Assistant Secretary of State for Near Eastern Affairs
  - Assistant Secretary of State for South and Central Asian Affairs
  - Assistant Secretary of State for Western Hemisphere Affairs
- Reporting to the under secretary of state for management:
  - Assistant Secretary of State for Administration
  - Assistant Secretary of State for Consular Affairs
  - Assistant Secretary of State for Diplomatic Security
- Reporting to the under secretary of state for economic affairs:
  - Assistant Secretary of State for Economic, Energy and Business Affairs
  - Assistant Secretary of State for Oceans and International Environmental and Scientific Affairs
- Reporting to the under secretary of state for public diplomacy and public affairs:
  - Assistant Secretary of State for Educational and Cultural Affairs
  - Assistant Secretary of State for Global Public Affairs
- Reporting to the under secretary of state for arms control and international security:
  - Assistant Secretary of State for International Security and Nonproliferation
  - Assistant Secretary of State for Political-Military Affairs
  - Assistant Secretary of State for Emerging Threats
  - Assistant Secretary of State for International Narcotics and Law Enforcement Affairs
- Reporting to the under secretary of state for foreign assistance, humanitarian affairs and religious freedom:
  - Assistant Secretary of State for Democracy, Human Rights, and Labor
  - Assistant Secretary of State for Population, Refugees, and Migration
  - Assistant Secretary of State for Global Health Security and Diplomacy

The following roles also possess a rank equivalent to assistant secretary:

- Chief of Protocol of the United States, with the rank of ambassador
- Coordinator for Counterterrorism, with the rank and status of ambassador-at-large
- Special Assistant to the Secretary and Executive Secretary of the Department
- Inspector General of the Department of State
- Legal Adviser
- Director General of the Foreign Service and Director of Global Talent
- Director, Policy Planning Staff
- Ambassador at Large for Cyberspace and Digital Policy
- Ambassador at Large for Global Women's Issues
- Ambassador at Large for Global Criminal Justice
- Ambassador at Large for International Religious Freedom
- Ambassador at Large to Monitor and Combat Trafficking in Persons
- Ambassador at Large for Global Health Security and Diplomacy
- Director of the Foreign Service Institute
- Science and Technology Advisor to the Secretary of State
- Chief Information Officer of the Department
- Director, Office of Foreign Missions, with rank of ambassador
- Director of Budget and Planning
- Comptroller of the Department
- Chief Economist of the Department
- Director Foreign Assistance
- Chief Medical Officer and Designated Agency Safety and Health Official
- Director, Office of Civil Rights
- Chief Diversity and Inclusion Officer
- Director, Office of Management Strategy and Solutions
- Director of Overseas Buildings Operations

== Current assistant secretaries of state ==
Office	Incumbent	Term began
=== Reporting to the under secretary of state for political affairs ===
Assistant Secretary of State for African Affairs; 1 FAM 121	Frank Garcia	June 1, 2026
Assistant Secretary of State for East Asian and Pacific Affairs; 1 FAM 131	Michael G. DeSombre	October 10, 2025
Assistant Secretary of State for European and Eurasian Affairs; 1 FAM 141	Brendan Hanrahan	August 24, 2026
Assistant Secretary of State for Near Eastern Affairs; 1 FAM 161	Donald Blome	August 17, 2026
Assistant Secretary of State for South and Central Asian Affairs; 1 FAM 171	S. Paul Kapur	October 22, 2025
Assistant Secretary of State for Western Hemisphere Affairs; 1 FAM 151	Juan Pablo Segura	August 14, 2026
Assistant Secretary of State for International Organization Affairs; 1 FAM 331	McCoy Pitt	January 20, 2025; Acting
=== Reporting to the under secretary of state for economic growth, energy, and the environment ===
Assistant Secretary of State for Economic, Energy, and Business Affairs; 1 FAM 421	Hugo Yue-Ho Yon	September 1, 2026; Acting
Assistant Secretary of State for Oceans and International Environmental and Scientific Affairs; 1 FAM 541	Wesley R. Brooks	May 28, 2026
=== Reporting to the under secretary of state for arms control and international security ===
Assistant Secretary of State for Arms Control and Nonproliferation; 1 FAM 441	Christopher Yeaw	December 30, 2025
Assistant Secretary of State for Political-Military Affairs; 1 FAM 411	Fleet White	August 14, 2026
Assistant Secretary of State for International Narcotics and Law Enforcement Affairs; 1 FAM 531	Frank Cartwright Weiland	May 22, 2026
Assistant Secretary of State for Emerging Threats; 1 FAM 421	Joshua Young	October 2, 2026; Acting
Coordinator for Counterterrorism; 1 FAM 421	Gregory LoGerfo	May 21, 2026
=== Reporting to the under secretary of state for public diplomacy and public affairs ===
Assistant Secretary of State for Educational and Cultural Affairs; 1 FAM 341	Catherine Dillon	May 18, 2026
Assistant Secretary of State for Global Public Affairs; 1 FAM 321	Dylan Johnson	January 30, 2026
=== Reporting to the under secretary of state for management ===
Assistant Secretary of State for Administration; 1 FAM 211	José Cunningham	March 24, 2025
Assistant Secretary of State for Consular Affairs; 1 FAM 251	Mora Namdar	December 22, 2025
Assistant Secretary of State for Diplomatic Security; 1 FAM 261	Todd Wilcox	October 14, 2025
Director General of the Foreign Service; 1 FAM 231	Thomas E. Lersten	September 23, 2026; Acting
Director of the National Foreign Affairs Training Center; 1 FAM 291	Howard Van Vranken	September 1, 2026
=== Reporting to the under secretary of state for foreign assistance, humanitarian affairs and religious freedom ===
Assistant Secretary of State for Democracy, Human Rights, and Labor; 1 FAM 511	Riley M. Barnes	October 10, 2025
Assistant Secretary of State for Population, Refugees, and Migration; 1 FAM 521	Andrew Veprek	January 2, 2026
Assistant Secretary of State for Global Health Security and Diplomacy; 1 FAM 550	Jeffrey Graham	January 21, 2025; Acting
=== Reporting directly to the secretary of state ===
Assistant Secretary of State for Legislative Affairs; 1 FAM 311	Katherine Bowles	September 1, 2026
Assistant Secretary of State for Intelligence and Research; 1 FAM 431	Michael Vance	August 17, 2026

== List of assistant secretaries of state, 1853–1937 ==
#	Picture	Name	State of residency	Term of office	President(s) served under	Secretary of State(s) served under
1	Ambrose Dudley Mann	Ambrose Dudley Mann	Virginia	March 23, 1853 – May 8, 1855	Franklin Pierce	William L. Marcy
2	William Hunter	William Hunter	Rhode Island	May 9, 1855 – October 31, 1855	Franklin Pierce	William L. Marcy
3		John Addison Thomas	New York	November 1, 1855 – April 3, 1857	Franklin Pierce; James Buchanan	William L. Marcy; Lewis Cass
4	John Appleton	John Appleton	Maine	April 4, 1857 – June 10, 1860	James Buchanan	Lewis Cass
5	William H. Trescot	William H. Trescot	South Carolina	June 8, 1860 – December 20, 1860	James Buchanan	Lewis Cass; Jeremiah S. Black
6	Frederick William Seward	Frederick W. Seward	New York	March 6, 1861 – March 4, 1869	Abraham Lincoln; Andrew Johnson	William H. Seward
7	J.C. Bancroft Davis	J.C. Bancroft Davis	New York	March 25, 1869 – November 13, 1871	Ulysses S. Grant	Hamilton Fish
8	Charles Hale	Charles Hale	Massachusetts	February 19, 1872 – January 24, 1873	Ulysses S. Grant	Hamilton Fish
9	J.C. Bancroft Davis	J.C. Bancroft Davis	New York	January 24, 1873 – January 30, 1874	Ulysses S. Grant	Hamilton Fish
10	John Lambert Cadwalader	John Lambert Cadwalader	New York	June 17, 1874 – March 20, 1877	Ulysses S. Grant; Rutherford B. Hayes	Hamilton Fish; William M. Evarts
11	Frederick William Seward	Frederick W. Seward	New York	March 16, 1877 – October 31, 1879	Rutherford B. Hayes	William M. Evarts
12	John Milton Hay	John Hay	Ohio	November 1, 1879 – May 3, 1881	Rutherford B. Hayes; James A. Garfield	William M. Evarts; James G. Blaine
13	Robert Roberts Hitt	Robert R. Hitt	Illinois	May 4, 1881 – December 19, 1881	James A. Garfield; Chester A. Arthur	James G. Blaine
14	J.C. Bancroft Davis	J.C. Bancroft Davis	New York	December 19, 1881 – July 7, 1882	Chester A. Arthur	Frederick T. Frelinghuysen
15		John Davis	Washington, D.C.	July 7, 1882 – February 23, 1885	Chester A. Arthur	Frederick T. Frelinghuysen
16	James D. Porter	James D. Porter	Tennessee	March 20, 1885 – September 17, 1887	Grover Cleveland	Thomas F. Bayard
17	George L. Rives	George L. Rives	New York	November 19, 1887 – March 5, 1889	Grover Cleveland	Thomas F. Bayard
18	William F. Wharton	William F. Wharton	Massachusetts	April 2, 1889 – March 20, 1893	Benjamin Harrison; Grover Cleveland	James G. Blaine; John W. Foster; Walter Q. Gresham
19	Josiah Quincy	Josiah Quincy	Massachusetts	March 20, 1893 – September 22, 1893	Grover Cleveland	Walter Q. Gresham
20	Edwin F. Uhl	Edwin F. Uhl	Michigan	November 1, 1893 – February 11, 1896	Grover Cleveland	Walter Q. Gresham; Richard Olney
21	William Woodville Rockhill	William Woodville Rockhill	Maryland	February 11, 1896 – May 10, 1897	Grover Cleveland; William McKinley	Richard Olney; John Sherman
22	William Rufus Day	William R. Day	Ohio	May 3, 1897 – April 27, 1898	William McKinley	John Sherman
23	John Bassett Moore	John B. Moore	New York	April 27, 1898 – September 16, 1898	William McKinley	William R. Day
24	David Jayne Hill	David Jayne Hill	New York	October 25, 1898 – January 28, 1903	William McKinley; Theodore Roosevelt	John Hay
25	Francis Butler Loomis	Francis B. Loomis	Ohio	January 7, 1903 – October 10, 1905	Theodore Roosevelt	John Hay; Elihu Root
26	Robert Bacon	Robert Bacon	New York	September 5, 1905 – January 27, 1909	Theodore Roosevelt	Elihu Root
27	John Callan O'Laughlin	John Callan O'Laughlin	Washington, D.C.	January 27, 1909 – March 5, 1909	Theodore Roosevelt	Robert Bacon
28	Huntington Wilson	Huntington Wilson	Illinois	March 5, 1909 – March 19, 1913	William Howard Taft; Woodrow Wilson	Philander C. Knox; William Jennings Bryan
29	John E. Osborne	John E. Osborne	Wyoming	April 21, 1913 – December 14, 1916	Thomas Woodrow Wilson	William Jennings Bryan; Robert Lansing
30		William Phillips	Massachusetts	January 24, 1917 – March 25, 1920	Thomas Woodrow Wilson	Robert Lansing; Bainbridge Colby
31		Fred Morris Dearing	Missouri	March 11, 1921 – February 28, 1922	Warren G. Harding	Charles Evans Hughes
32	Leland B. Harrison	Leland B. Harrison	Illinois	March 31, 1922 – June 30, 1924	Warren G. Harding; Calvin Coolidge	Charles Evans Hughes
32	Wilbur J. Carr	Wilbur J. Carr	Ohio	July 1, 1924 – July 28, 1937	Calvin Coolidge; Herbert Hoover; Franklin Roosevelt	Charles Evans Hughes; Frank B. Kellogg; Henry L. Stimson; Cordell Hull

== Second Assistant Secretary of State ==
The Consular and Diplomatic Appropriations Act for the year ending June 30, 1867 authorized the president to appoint a second assistant secretary of state. Duties of incumbents varied less over the years than did those of the other assistant secretary positions. Responsibilities included: supervision of correspondence with diplomatic officers; preparation of drafts of treaties, conventions, diplomatic notes, and instructions; detailed treatment of current diplomatic and political questions; approval of correspondence for the signature of the secretary or acting secretary; and consultation on matters of diplomatic procedure, international law and policy, and traditional practices of the department. The Foreign Service Act of 1924 abolished numerical titles for assistant secretaries of state. Only two people held the position from 1866 to 1924.

#	Picture	Name	State of residency	Term of office	President(s) served under	Secretary of State(s) served under
1		William Hunter	Rhode Island	July 27, 1866 - July 22, 1886	Andrew Johnson; Ulysses S. Grant; Rutherford B. Hayes; James A. Garfield; Chester A. Arthur; Grover Cleveland	William H. Seward; Elihu Benjamin Washburne; Hamilton Fish; William Maxwell Evarts; James Gillespie Blaine; Frederick Theodore Frelinghuysen; Thomas F. Bayard, Sr.
2		Alvey A. Adee	District of Columbia	August 3, 1886 - June 30, 1924	Grover Cleveland; Benjamin Harrison; William McKinley; Theodore Roosevelt; William Howard Taft; Thomas Woodrow Wilson; Warren G. Harding; Calvin Coolidge	Thomas F. Bayard, Sr. James Gillespie Blaine; John Watson Foster; Walter Quintin Gresham; Richard Olney; John Sherman; William Rufus Day; John Milton Hay; Elihu Root; Robert Bacon; Philander Chase Knox; William Jennings Bryan; Robert Lansing; Bainbridge Colby; Charles Evans Hughes

== Third Assistant Secretary of State ==
A federal appropriations act for the year ending Jun 30, 1875 (Jun 20, 1874; 18 Stat. 90), authorized the president to appoint a third assistant secretary of state. The secretary of state was authorized to prescribe the duties of the assistant secretaries and other Department of State employees, "and may make changes and transfers therein when, in his judgment, it becomes necessary." The third assistant secretary's duties varied over the years, including such diverse assignments as: supervision of several geographic divisions; oversight of the bureaus of accounts and appointments; international conferences and commissions; and ceremonials and protocol, including presentation to the president of chiefs of foreign diplomatic missions. The Foreign Service Act of 1924 (May 24, 1924; 43 Stat 146) abolished numerical titles for assistant secretaries of state.

#	Picture	Name	State of residency	Term of office	President(s) served under	Secretary of State(s) served under
1		John Allen Campbell	Wyoming	February 24, 1875 - November 30, 1877	Ulysses S. Grant; Rutherford B. Hayes	Hamilton Fish; William M. Evarts
2		Charles Payson	Massachusetts, New York	June 22, 1878 - June 30, 1881	Rutherford B. Hayes; James A. Garfield	William M. Evarts; James G. Blaine
3		Walker Blaine	Maine	July 1, 1881 - June 30, 1882	James A. Garfield; Chester A. Arthur	James G. Blaine; Frederick T. Frelinghuysen
4		Alvey A. Adee	District of Columbia	July 18, 1882 - August 5, 1886	Chester A. Arthur; Grover Cleveland	Frederick T. Frelinghuysen; Thomas F. Bayard, Sr.
5		John Bassett Moore	Delaware, New York	August 6, 1886 - September 30, 1891	Grover Cleveland; Benjamin Harrison	Thomas F. Bayard, Sr. James G. Blaine
6		William Morton Grinnell	New York	February 15, 1892 - April 16, 1893	Benjamin Harrison; Grover Cleveland	James G. Blaine; John W. Foster
7		Edward Henry Strobel	New York	April 17, 1893 - April 16, 1894	Grover Cleveland	Walter Q. Gresham
8		William Woodville Rockhill	District of Columbia, Maryland	April 17, 1894 - February 13, 1896	Grover Cleveland	Walter Q. Gresham; Richard Olney
9		William Woodward Baldwin	New York	February 29, 1896 - April 1, 1897	Grover Cleveland, William McKinley	Richard Olney; John Sherman
10		Thomas Wilbur Cridler	West Virginia	April 8, 1897 - November 15, 1901	William McKinley	John Sherman; William R. Day; John Hay
11		Herbert Henry Davis Peirce	Massachusetts	November 16, 1901 - June 22, 1906	Theodore Roosevelt	John Hay; Elihu Root
12		Huntington Wilson	Illinois	July 2, 1906 - December 30, 1908	Theodore Roosevelt	Elihu Root
13		William Phillips	Massachusetts	January 11, 1909 - October 13, 1909	Theodore Roosevelt, William Howard Taft	Elihu Root; Robert Bacon; Philander C. Knox
14		Chandler Hale	Maine	October 14, 1909 - April 21, 1913	William Howard Taft, Woodrow Wilson	Philander C. Knox; William Jennings Bryan
15		Dudley Field Malone	New York	April 22, 1913 - November 22, 1913	Woodrow Wilson	William Jennings Bryan
16		William Phillips	Massachusetts	March 17, 1914 - January 24, 1917	Woodrow Wilson	William Jennings Bryan; Robert Lansing
17		Breckinridge Long	Massachusetts	January 29, 1917 - June 8, 1920	Woodrow Wilson	Robert Lansing; Bainbridge Colby
18		Van Santvoord Merle-Smith	New York	June 24, 1920 - March 4, 1921	Woodrow Wilson	Bainbridge Colby
19		Robert Woods Bliss	New York	March 16, 1921 - May 3, 1923	Warren G. Harding	Charles Evans Hughes
20		J. Butler Wright	Wyoming	June 11, 1923 - June 30, 1924	Warren G. Harding; Calvin Coolidge	Charles Evans Hughes

== Defunct offices including the designation of Assistant Secretary of State ==
- Assistant Secretary of State for Occupied Areas
