= Anny Vu =

American diplomat

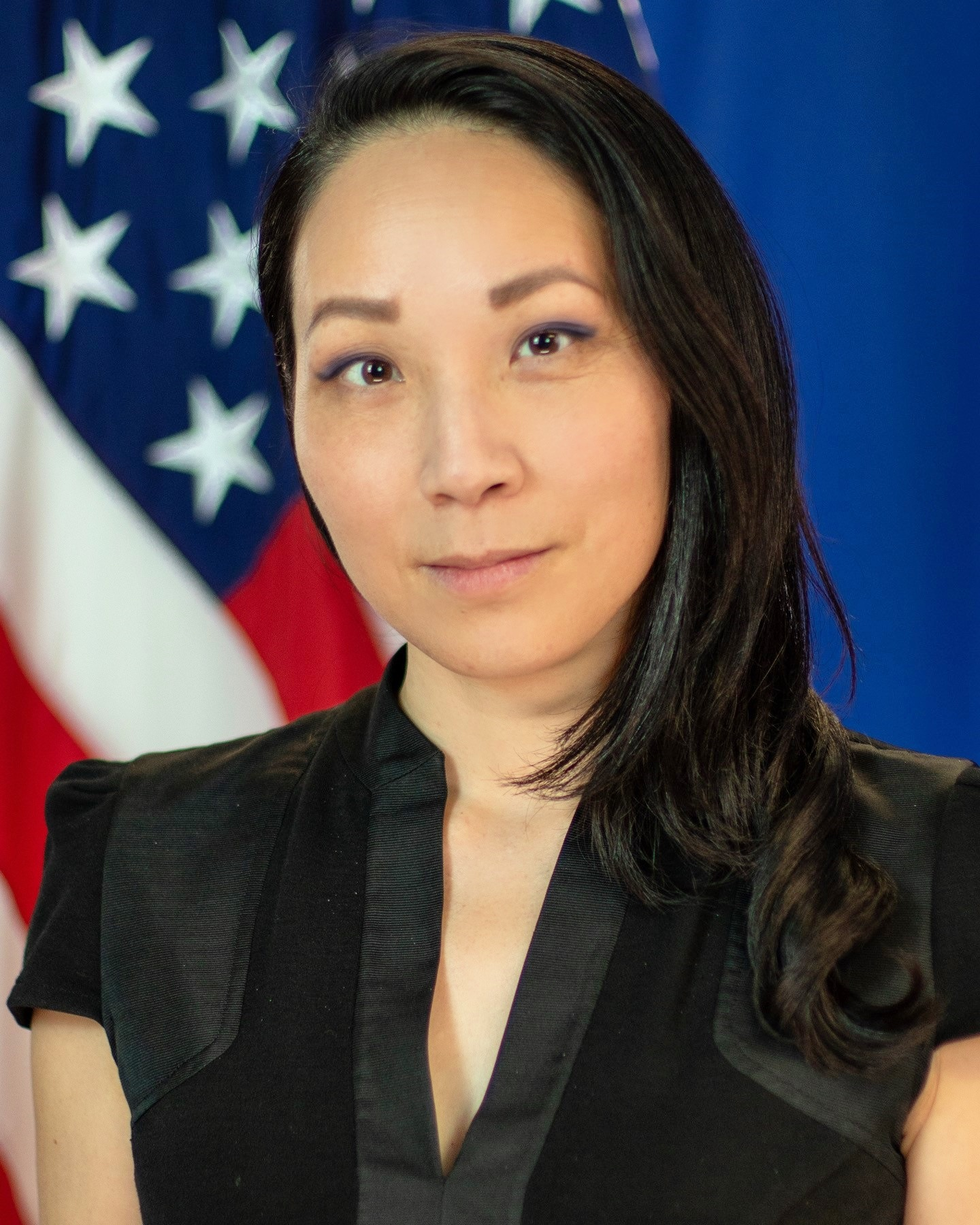
- Official portrait, 2025

United States Chargé d'affaires to China
- In office March 20, 2025 – May 15, 2025
- Preceded by: Sarah M. Beran (Chargé d'affaires); R. Nicholas Burns
- Succeeded by: David Perdue

Anny Vu is an American diplomat who served as United States Chargé d'affaires to the People's Republic of China from March to May 2025. Vu is currently serving as the Senior Bureau Official for the State Department's newly established Bureau of Emerging Threats.

== Career ==
Vu is a career senior foreign service officer. She has held key positions including Political Chief at the Taipei Main Office of the American Institute in Taiwan, Deputy China Coordinator in the State Department’s Office of China Coordination, and Deputy Director of the Office of China Affairs. Vu has also served on the National Security Council in various roles and was a member of the Secretary of State’s Policy Planning Staff.

Her overseas assignments include posts at U.S. embassies in Beijing and Paris, and at the U.S. Mission to the United Nations. In Washington, she has worked in the State Department’s Operations Center and in regional bureaus. Vu was also an adjunct associate professor at Columbia University’s School of International and Public Affairs.
