= Terry C. Johnston =

American Western fiction author (1947–2001)

- Born: January 1, 1947; Arkansas City, Kansas, U.S.
- Died: March 25, 2001 (aged 54); Billings, Montana, U.S.
- Education: Central State University
- Occupation: Author
- Writing career
- Genre: Western fiction

Terry Conrad Johnston (1 January 1947 – 25 March 2001) was an American Western fiction author who wrote 31 novels and had more than 10 million books in print.

== Background ==
He was born in Arkansas City, Kansas. His parents were a junior college president and a teacher. He gained a BA from Central State University in Edmond, Oklahoma. As a young man, he traveled and worked various jobs, all the while becoming a student of the Old West. Johnston published his first novel, Carry the Wind, in 1982 after it had been rejected by 29 publishers; it won the Western Writers of America's Medicine Pipe Bearer's Award. Johnston wrote his first novel while he worked as a lease manager for Northwest Auto in Northglenn, Colorado, using the company's word processor after work to write, sometimes working through the night. He settled near Billings, Montana.

== Major works ==
Johnston is best known for two major works: a series of nine historical novels spanning the Rocky Mountain Fur Trade era and its eventual demise told through the eyes of the protagonist, Titus "Scratch" Bass; and a larger number of novels about the Indian wars of the West, the Plainsmen Series, following the conflicts through protagonist Seamus Donegan. Another series of books was based on a possibly true story of a relationship General Custer had with a Cheyenne girl.

== Death and legacy ==
Johnston said to his wife that he felt when he killed off Scratch or when Scratch died he wouldn't last too long afterwards, and he died of colon cancer on March 25, 2001, only a month after being diagnosed. In his memory The Terry C. Johnston Memorial Scholarship Fund was established at Montana State University Billings, as well as donations made to the Custer Battlefield Preservation Committee and the National Colorectal Cancer Research Alliance.

== Personal life ==
He was married three times. His first wife was Doris (Howard) with whom he had one son (Joshua); they divorced in 1982. Johnston's second wife was Rhonda (Hill) Stacy with whom he had one son (Noah) and one daughter (Erinn); they divorced in 1992. His third wife was Vanette.

== Published work ==
Bass/Paddock Trilogy (Bass' middle years)

- Carry the Wind (1982)
- Borderlords (1985)
- One-Eyed Dream (1988)

Son of the Plains (Custer novels)

- Long Winter Gone (1990)
- Seize the Sky (1991)
- Whisper of the Wolf (1991)

Jonas Hook

- Cry of the Hawk (1992)
- Winter Rain (1993)
- Dream Catcher (1994)

Titus Bass
(Bass' early years)

- Dance on the Wind (1995)
- Buffalo Palace (1996)
- Crack in the Sky (1997)

(Bass' latter years)

- Ride the Moon Down (1998)
- Death Rattle (1999)
- Wind Walker (2001)

The Plainsmen Series

- Sioux Dawn: The Fetterman Massacre, 1866 (1990)
- Red Cloud's Revenge: Showdown on the Northern Plains, 1867 (1990)
- The Stalkers: The Battle of Beecher Island, 1868 (1990)
- Black Sun: The Battle of Summit Springs, 1869 (1991)
- Devil's Backbone: The Modoc War, 1872–3 (1991)
- Shadow Riders: The Southern Plains Uprising, 1873 (1991)
- Dying Thunder: The Fight at Adobe Walls and the Battle of Palo Duro Canyon-1876–1875 (1992)
- Blood Song: The Battle of Powder River and the Beginning of the Great Sioux War of 1876 (1992)
- Reap the Whirlwind: The Battle of the Rosebud, June 1876 (1994)
- Trumpet on the Land: The Aftermath of Custer's Massacre, 1876 (1995)
- A Cold Day in Hell: The Dull Knife Battle, 1876 (1995)
- Wolf Mountain Moon: The Battle of the Butte, 1877 (1997)
- Ashes of Heaven: The Lame Deer Fight-May 7, 1877 and the End of the Great Sioux War (1998)
- Cries from the Earth: The Outbreak of the Nez Perce War and the Battle of White Bird Canyon June 17, 1877 (1999)
- Lay the Mountains Low: The Flight of Nez Perce from Idaho and the Battle of the Big Hole, August 9–10, 1877 (2000)
- Turn the Stars Upside Down: The Last Days and Tragic Death of Crazy Horse (2001)
