= Rogers Act =

- Long title: An Act for the reorganization and improvement of the Foreign Service of the United States, and for other purposes.
- Nicknames: Foreign Service Act of 1924
- Enacted by: the 68th United States Congress
- Effective: July 1, 1924

Citations
- Public law: Pub. L. 68–135
- Statutes at Large: 43 Stat. 140

Codification
- Titles amended: 22 U.S.C.: Foreign Relations and Intercourse
- U.S.C. sections created: 22 U.S.C. ch. 52 § 3901 et seq.

Legislative history
- Introduced in the House as H.R. 6357 by John Jacob Rogers (R–MA) on February 5, 1924; Committee consideration by House Foreign Affairs; Passed the House on May 1, 1924 (Passed); Passed the Senate on May 15, 1924 (Passed) with amendment; House agreed to Senate amendment on May 20, 1924 (Agreed); Signed into law by President Calvin Coolidge on May 24, 1924

The Rogers Act of 1924, often referred to as the Foreign Service Act of 1924, is the legislation that merged the United States diplomatic and consular services into the United States Foreign Service. It defined a personnel system under which the United States secretary of state is authorized to assign and rotate diplomats abroad. It merged the low-paid high prestige diplomatic service with the higher paid, middle class consul service. The act provided a merit-based career path, with guaranteed rotations and better pay.

== History ==
Article II, section 2 of the US Constitution authorized the president to appoint, by and with the advice and consent of the Senate, "Ambassadors, other public Ministers, and Consuls." From 1789 to 1924, the diplomatic service, which staffed US legations and embassies, and the consular service, which was primarily responsible for promoting American commerce and assisting distressed American sailors, developed separately.

With small appropriations from Congress, overseas service could not be sustained based on salary alone. Diplomatic and consular service appointments fell on those with the financial means to sustain their work abroad. That and a government-wide practice of political appointments based on nomination, rather than merit, led to careers for those with relations and wealth, rather than skill and knowledge.

== Reform ==
Wilbur J. Carr, the chief of the consular bureau, sought to end the political turmoil that affected both the diplomatic and consular services. Working with his colleague Francois Jones, they composed a congressional bill to change the services into one based on a merit system.

Between 1895 and 1905, the bill was continually defeated. Then secretary of state Elihu Root in 1905, a reformer himself, discovered Mr. Carr as head of the consular bureau. Taking the original ideas, Root worked with Senator Henry Cabot Lodge and succeeded in passing a merit-based bill for the consular service in 1906.

Carr began his initial overseas tour in London in 1916. He noted tensions between the diplomatic and consular corps in London and was "shocked to see the staff still wearing top hats and long-tailed coats to work each day". He was further surprised when he heard some of the American diplomatic staff speaking with British accents. He discovered that some of these officers had been living in London for so long they had become almost identical to the British foreign service members with whom they often met and socialized. Carr would later comment that "I have seen some of these young secretaries, who have had exceptional social opportunities and advantages in the capitals abroad, become the most abject followers of the social regime in the foreign capital. One of the things that I hope is going to follow from this bill is to send some of these de-Americanized secretaries to Singapore as vice consul, or to force them out of the service."

With trade becoming an important foreign relations issue in the 1920s, U.S. representative John Jacob Rogers of Massachusetts sought to complete reforms started by Carr, now Assistant Secretary of State. The bill passed May 24 as the Foreign Service Act of 1924 although it is also called the Rogers Act in honor of the principal author.

== Provisions ==
- Merged the diplomatic and consular services into the unified United States Foreign Service
- Personnel system for assigning diplomats and support personnel
- Competitive examinations for new personnel
- Promotion through merit
- Retirement at age 65, which was later lowered to 60 in 1946

== Controversy after passage ==
After passage of the Rogers Act, the Executive Committee of the Foreign Service Personnel Board drafted a memorandum on avoiding appointment of blacks and women in the new competitive process. Then secretary of state Charles Evans Hughes dismissed such views. The first black candidate to pass the exam in 1925 was Clifton Reginald Wharton, Sr. While he was allowed to serve, his initial treatment appeared to be far from ideal.

== See also ==
- United States Department of State
- United States Foreign Service
