= William Hunter (assistant secretary of state) =

American politician and diplomat (1805–1866)

William Hunter Jr.
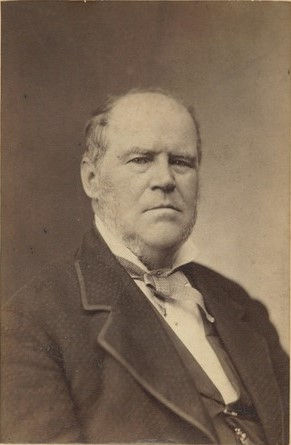
- portrait, c. 1866-1886

1st United States Second Assistant Secretary of State
- In office July 27, 1866 – July 22, 1886
- President: Andrew Johnson; Ulysses S. Grant; Rutherford B. Hayes; James Garfield; Chester A. Arthur; Grover Cleveland
- Preceded by: Position established
- Succeeded by: Alvey A. Adee

Acting United States Secretary of State
- In office December 15, 1860 – December 16, 1860
- President: James Buchanan
- Preceded by: Edward Everett
- Succeeded by: William L. Marcy
- In office March 4, 1853 – March 7, 1853
- President: Franklin Pierce
- Preceded by: Lewis Cass
- Succeeded by: Jeremiah S. Black

2nd United States Assistant Secretary of State
- In office May 9, 1855 – October 31, 1855
- President: Franklin Pierce
- Preceded by: Ambrose Dudley Mann
- Succeeded by: John Addison Thomas

20th Chief Clerk of the Department of State
- In office May 17, 1852 – May 7, 1855
- President: Millard Fillmore; Franklin Pierce
- Preceded by: William S. Derrick
- Succeeded by: Ambrose Dudley Mann (as Assistant Secretary of State in 1853)

Personal details
- Born: William Hunter, Jr. 1805
- Died: July 22, 1886 (aged 80–81)
- Profession: Diplomat

William Hunter Jr. (November 8, 1805 – July 22, 1886) was a politician and diplomat from Rhode Island. He was a confidential clerk to Secretary of State John Clayton in the United States Department of State from 1849 to 1850, serving with George P. Fisher. He had served as acting Secretary of State on three occasions, once in 1853, again in 1860, and to temporarily substitute for Secretary William H. Seward after his injury in a carriage accident and subsequent wounding in an attack concurrent with the assassination of Abraham Lincoln. He also served as Chief Clerk of the State Department from 1852 to 1855, Assistant Secretary of State in 1855 and Second Assistant Secretary of State from 1866 until his death in 1886.

Government offices
Preceded by (none)	United States Second Assistant Secretary of State; July 27, 1866 – July 22, 1886	Succeeded by Alvey A. Adee
Preceded by Ambrose Dudley Mann	United States Assistant Secretary of State; May 9, 1855 – October 31, 1855	Succeeded by John Addison Thomas
Preceded by William S. Derrick	Chief Clerk of the United States State Department; May 17, 1852 – May 7, 1855	Succeeded by (none)
