= Julius Gareché Lay =

American diplomat to Honduras and Uruguay

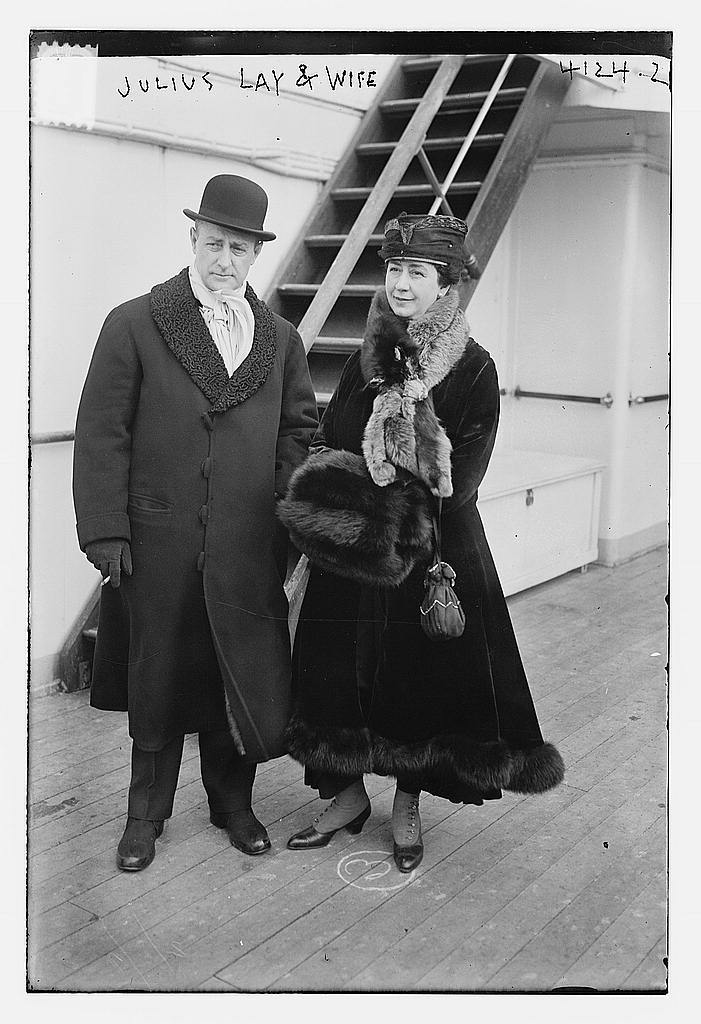

Julius Gareché Lay (August 9, 1872 – August 28, 1939) was an American diplomat. He was the United States Ambassador to Honduras from 1930 to 1935 and the United States Ambassador to Uruguay from 1935 to 1937.

== Biography ==
He was born in Washington, D.C., on August 9, 1872.

He served as the U.S. Vice & Deputy Consul General in Ottawa, Ontario, Canada, from 1893 to 1896. He was the U.S. Consul in Windsor, Ontario, Canada, from 1896 to 1899. He was the U.S. Consul General in Barcelona, Spain, from 1899 to 1904; Canton, China, from 1904 to 1906; Cape Town, South Africa, from 1906 to 1910; Rio de Janeiro, Brazil, from 1910 to 1914. He was assigned to Berlin, Germany, from 1916 to 1917 during World War I.

In 1920 he was a foreign trade advisor and he temporarily resigned to join a banking firm of Speyer and Co.

He was assigned to Calcutta, India, in 1926. He was the United States Ambassador to Honduras from May 31, 1930, to March 17, 1935, and the United States Ambassador to Uruguay from May 20, 1935, to August 31, 1937.

He died on August 28, 1939.
