= Dick Morris =

American political commentator and consultant (born 1948)

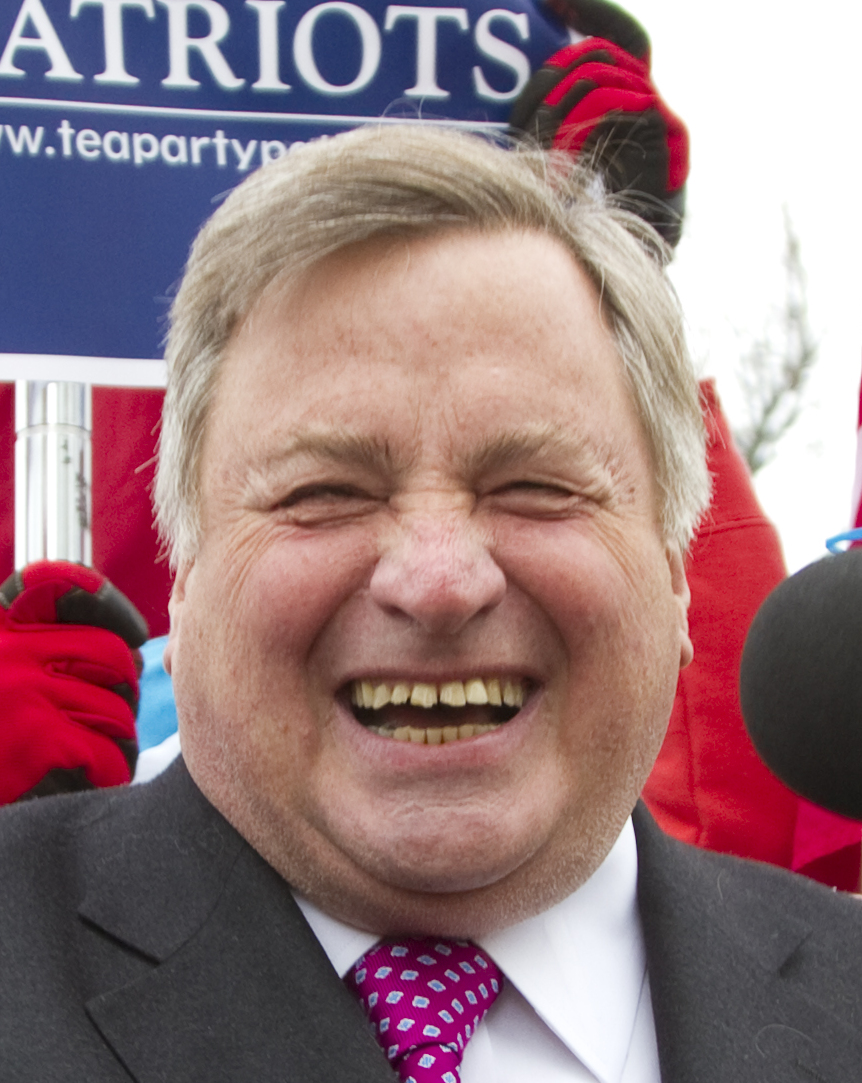
- Morris in 2011
- Born: Richard Samuel Morris; November 28, 1948 (age 77); New York City, U.S.
- Education: Columbia University (BA)
- Political party: Democratic (before 1996); Republican (since 1996)
- Spouse: Eileen McGann
- Website: Official website

Richard Samuel Morris (born November 28, 1948) is an American author, commentator, and former political consultant.

A friend and advisor to Bill Clinton during his time as Governor of Arkansas and since his 1978 run, Morris became a political adviser to the White House after Clinton was elected president in 1992. Morris encouraged Clinton to pursue Third Way policies of triangulation that combined traditional Republican and Democratic proposals, rhetoric, and issues so as to achieve maximum political gain and popularity. He worked as a Republican strategist before joining the Clinton administration, where he helped Clinton recover from the Republican Revolution by advising him to adopt more moderate policies. The president consulted Morris in secret beginning in 1994. Clinton's communications director George Stephanopoulos has said, "Over the course of the first nine months of 1995, no single person had more power over the president." Morris went on to become campaign manager of Clinton's successful 1996 bid for re-election as president, but his tenure on that political campaign was cut short two months before the election, when it was revealed that he had not only solicited a prostitute but also allowed her to listen in on conversations with the President.

As of 2000, Morris wrote a weekly column for the New York Post that is carried nationwide, and contributes columns and blogs to both the print and online versions of The Hill. He is also president of Vote.com. By 2005, Morris had emerged as a harsh critic of the Clintons and wrote several books that criticize them, including Rewriting History, a rebuttal to then-U.S. Senator Hillary Clinton's Living History.

Morris was the strategist for Republican Christy Mihos's campaign in the 2010 Massachusetts gubernatorial election, and supported Mitt Romney in 2012. He has appeared in the past on Fox News for political commentary, especially appearing on The O'Reilly Factor and Hannity. After the 2012 presidential election, Morris did not appear on Fox News for three months, and the network ultimately opted not to renew his contract.

== Early life ==
Morris was born in 1948 in New York City, the son of writer Terry Lesser Morris, an early proponent of confessional human interest stories, and attorney Eugene J. Morris. He attended Stuyvesant High School in New York City, where he was active on the debate team. He managed Jerrold Nadler's campaign for class president. Morris was also involved in the first campaign of Richard Gottfried for New York State Assembly in 1970. Morris graduated from Stuyvesant in 1964, then attended Columbia University, where he earned a Bachelor of Arts degree, graduating in 1967. At Columbia, he roomed with Nadler.

== Morris and the Clintons ==
Morris first worked with Bill and Hillary Clinton during Bill Clinton's successful 1978 bid for Governor of Arkansas. Morris did not have a role in Clinton's successful 1992 presidential campaign, which instead was headed by David Wilhelm, James Carville, George Stephanopoulos, and Paul Begala. After the 1994 midterm elections, in which Republicans took control of both houses of the United States Congress and gained considerable power in the states, Clinton once again sought Morris' help to prepare for the 1996 presidential election.

In his writings, Morris "recounts the First Lady’s numerous kindnesses to his aging (and of course Jewish) parents."

=== Sex worker scandal ===
On August 29, 1996, Morris resigned from the Clinton campaign after tabloid reports stated that he had been involved with a prostitute, Sherry Rowlands, as reported by The Washington Post. A New York tabloid newspaper, Star, had obtained and published a set of photographs allegedly of Morris and the woman on a Washington, D.C., hotel balcony. News of the impending publication broke during the third day of the 1996 Democratic Convention. The Electronic Telegraph reported unverified claims that in order to impress Rowlands, Morris invited her to listen in on his conversations with President Clinton. It was reported that Rowlands worked for $200 an hour and that after he solicited her for sex, Morris gave Rowlands access to President Clinton's campaign speeches before they were delivered and also let her hear the President's voice during a telephone conservation. According to Rowlands, Morris had a fondness for sucking toes. It was also alleged he had an out-of-wedlock child from an affair with a Texas woman.

Morris resigned on the same day that Bill Clinton spoke and accepted the nomination at the Democratic National Convention. In his resignation statement, he said that "while I served I sought to avoid the limelight because I did not want to become the message. Now, I resign so I will not become the issue." In his response, President Clinton praised Morris as a "friend", and publicly thanked him for his years of service. Privately, several of Clinton's aides were furious that in his resignation statement Morris credited himself with helping the President "come back from being buried in a landslide" and that Morris ended by comparing himself to Robert F. Kennedy.

Morris was featured on two consecutive covers of Time magazine. The September 2, 1996 issue, which was released before the prostitute story broke, featured Morris as "The Man Who Has Clinton's Ear". The following week, the cover featured Morris and his wife, Eileen McGann, and the headline read "The Morris Mess: After the Fall". Montgomery Blair Sibley wrote a book Why Just Her in defence of the "Washington Madam", Debra Jeane Palfrey. In it, he wrote that Morris was a client of Palfrey's escort agency, and the first individual he (Sibley) planned to call in Palfrey's defence.

=== Later work ===
In his 1997 book, Behind the Oval Office, Morris wrote that, following an argument in the Arkansas Governor's Mansion in May 1990, he strode toward the exit and was tackled by Clinton. In 2003, Morris further stated that Clinton cocked his arm back to throw a punch, but Hillary Clinton pulled her husband off Morris. In both versions of the story, she consoled Morris and apologized to him, stating that Bill behaved as such only with those he cared for most. According to Morris, she did this to keep him quiet about the incident. He says the incident was the reason for denying Bill Clinton's request to work on the 1992 campaign.

Morris has become a vocal and regular critic of the Clintons since his departure, in particular Hillary Rodham Clinton and her bid for the presidency. Morris has written extensively about the Clintons (see below) and also contributed to Hillary: The Movie, a documentary about Rodham Clinton when she was still a 2008 presidential candidate. Later, after Bill Clinton's comments about the similarities between Barack Obama's popularity and that of presidential candidate Jesse Jackson in 1988, Morris put out an article on his blog that asserted that this was Clinton's way of injecting race into the political campaign.

== Political consulting ==
As of August 2009, Morris lends his name and assistance to the League of American Voters, an advocacy group for seniors to defeat the Patient Protection and Affordable Care Act. He has been described as "America's most ruthless political consultant" in the BBC documentary Century of the Self, which chronicled how he brought lifestyle marketing to politics for the first time.

Morris has consulted for candidates in other countries of the western hemisphere, including the campaigns of Fernando de la Rua for President of Argentina (1999), Jorge Batlle for President of Uruguay (1999), Vicente Fox for President of Mexico (2000), and Raphael Trotman for President of Guyana (2006). Morris and his wife, Eileen McGann, are behind www.vote.com, a site intended to register non-scientific political public opinion on various issues.

Morris worked as a strategist for Christy Mihos, who sought the Republican nomination to run for Governor of Massachusetts in 2010 against incumbent Deval Patrick overseeing strategy, polling, and advertising. At the Republican state convention, Mihos lost to Charlie Baker by 89 percent to 11 percent; by failing to reach 15 percent, Mihos did not qualify for a primary against Baker.

== Guest commentator and political prognosticator ==
Since leaving Clinton's employ in 1996, Morris has said he has become profoundly "disillusioned" with the actions of the Clintons in the late 1990s. He has since formed a career as a political commentator and critic of the Clintons (particularly Hillary), appearing on Fox News programs such as Hannity & Colmes, Hannity, and The O'Reilly Factor, and on various local and nationally syndicated radio talk shows. Morris is also a regular columnist and Pundits Blogger for The Hill, a nonpartisan daily newspaper based in Washington, D.C., and for Newsmax, a conservative online news website. Morris regularly makes predictions about candidates' chances of winning elections during these appearances.

Regarding the 2004 Democratic presidential nomination, he initially stated that Howard Dean's candidacy could be written off right away. He had earlier discussed the likelihood of Dean defeating John Kerry after early strong showings by the former Vermont governor. Kerry defeated Dean and all his other rivals and won the nomination.

In a column in The Hill on June 22, 2005, Morris predicted that Hillary Clinton would face her "worst nightmare" in her 2006 Senate race against Republican candidate Judge Jeanine Pirro, whose campaign subsequently collapsed within a matter of two months after repeated crushing defeats in the opinion polls due to her husband's alleged Mafia ties. He even went so far as to suggest that Hillary Clinton would drop out to focus on her 2008 presidential campaign.

In 2005 Morris wrote that Hurricane Katrina "has the capacity to shape the second Bush term in the same way September 11 shaped his first term—not only in rebuilding New Orleans but in taking preventative steps around the nation to bolster our defenses against natural and man-made disasters and terror strikes. Responding to disasters is a source of presidential strength and popularity, and Bush is about to show how it is done."

In August 2011, Morris began a petition on his website opposing federal funding for the Park51 Muslim community center, claiming that the center is "designed to celebrate the attacks that killed 3,000 Americans", and that the center would "train the same kinds of terrorists who caused the... attacks".

=== 2008 election ===
In a 2005 book on the 2008 presidential campaign, Morris stated that it was most likely that Hillary Clinton would face Condoleezza Rice for the presidency. Morris's critics reacted by mocking his mistaken predictions of past races. Appearing on Fox News' Hannity and Colmes on January 29, 2008, Morris said that those voting for John Edwards were "at the moment... those that can't decide which they don't like more—a black or a woman getting elected". Morris elaborated that exit polls showed some Edwards voters were unsure if a woman or an African-American, in reference to then Democratic Primary front runners Hillary Clinton and Barack Obama, could get elected to the presidency for the first time in 2008.

In the weeks leading up to the 2008 election, Morris correctly predicted that Obama would win the election in a landslide, but incorrectly predicted that Obama would win Missouri, Arkansas, North Carolina, Arizona, Tennessee, and West Virginia by comfortable margins, while Louisiana, Georgia and South Carolina would be tossups. Of those states, Obama only won North Carolina, by a close margin.

After Obama won the 2008 election, Morris was critical of him. In early 2009, Morris said: "Those crazies in Montana who say, 'We're going to kill ATF agents because the UN's going to take over'? Well, they're beginning to have a case." In April 2009, Morris keynoted an animated debate at the Yale Political Union on the topic "Resolved: Save Capitalism from President Obama".

=== 2012 election ===
During the 2012 United States presidential election, Morris received widespread attention for his inaccurate predictions and controversial statements about candidates. In a March 2011 column for The Hill, Morris predicted that Obama would not win a second term as president. In July 2012, Morris predicted that Mitt Romney would choose Florida Senator Marco Rubio as his running mate as an effort to court the Latino vote; Romney ultimately chose Paul Ryan. In August 2012, Morris predicted that Bill Clinton was going to vote for Mitt Romney, but that he would still speak in favor of Obama because "his wife is hostage."

In October 2012, Morris was a speaker at a special meeting of the Republican Caucus of the Georgia House of Representatives to discuss claims that Obama was using 'mind-control' techniques to create a Communist dictatorship controlled by the United Nations under the guise of promoting sustainability and public transportation. Speaking at the event, Morris argued that Obama's aim was to join with the United Nations to "force everyone into the cities from whence our ancestors fled."

On the day before the 2012 U.S. presidential election, Morris predicted on his website and in an article in The Hill that the Republican candidate, Mitt Romney, would win the presidency in a landslide "approaching the magnitude of Obama's against McCain." Specifically, he stated that Romney would win 325 electoral votes and that Obama would win 213. Obama ended up winning 332 electoral votes with Romney winning 206, meaning Morris was off by 119 electoral votes. He explained the logic behind his prediction in a video posted at his website. He made this prediction in the face of an overwhelming consensus among expert pollsters leading up to election night that Obama would win at least the Electoral College and likely the popular vote. Morris wrote on his website, "On Sunday, we changed our clocks. On Tuesday, we'll change our president." With regard to his prognostications, Morris announced on Fox and Friends two days before the election that after the election "either I'm gonna have to go through a big reckoning, or they [the mainstream pollsters] are." Jon Stewart mocked the idea on The Daily Show, calling Dick Morris the "King of Wrong Mountain" and claiming that pundits live in a "reckoning-free zone." Morris was the least accurate major pundit in predicting the 2012 presidential election.

In Morris's article in The Hill, he identified some "key mistakes" by the Obama campaign, which he stated would cost Obama the election:

- The campaign "bet the farm on negative ads in swing states."
- Obama never moved to the political center.
- The Obama campaign did not consider Pennsylvania, Wisconsin, Michigan or Minnesota swing states.
- Obama "became nothing more than a nasty partisan" instead of trying to look presidential.
- Obama offered nothing more than "a grab-bag of special-interest pleadings for single women, unions, college kids and minorities".
- Obama underperformed in the first presidential debate.
- Obama was slow to release information about the attack on the U.S. diplomatic mission in Benghazi.
- Obama returned to campaigning too quickly after Hurricane Sandy.

On November 7, 2012, the day after the election, Morris published an article in The Hill titled "Why I was wrong". Morris stated that he had "egg on his face" and that the "key reason for my bum prediction is that I believed, mistakenly, that the 2008 surge in black, Latino and young voter turnout would recede in 2012 to 'normal' levels. Didn't happen. These high levels of minority and young voter participation are here to stay. And, with them, a permanent reshaping of our nation's politics." In a subsequent interview on Fox News, Morris added: "I called it as I saw it from the polling and I did the best I could and I also worked very hard for Romney." He elaborated on the latter point by explaining that he thought it was his duty to help the Romney campaign by countering pessimism about Romney's chances.

=== Other elections ===
In March 2021, it was reported by The New York Times that he was meeting with Donald Trump in New York, "encouraging him to take on the party he once led".

== Foreign political consultant ==
Morris worked with the UK Independence Party in their campaign before the 2004 European Parliament election. The party, which advocated withdrawal from the European Union, won 12 of the United Kingdom's 78 seats.

In 2004 and 2005, he and his wife had acted as campaign consultants to the successful Yushchenko presidential campaign in Ukraine. Morris reports that he insisted on the use of exit polls as a means of potentially exposing ballot tampering. He argues this played a significant role in forcing the government of then President Leonid Kuchma to acquiesce to a new poll when the official results of the first varied materially from the exit surveys. Faced with a similar (though smaller) divergence between exit polling and election returns, he took the opposite stance in a 2004 article in The Hill when he suspected "foul play" on the part of the exit pollsters in the US presidential race.

In a November 13, 2007 press conference in Nairobi, Kenya, Morris announced that he would be offering his consultancy services pro bono for the campaign to elect Raila Odinga as President of Kenya in the 2007 presidential election running on the Orange Democratic Movement ticket. With four weeks to the national elections, an editorial in one of the leading dailies called into question the legalities of Morris' consulting work from the perspective of his presence in and lack of legal ability to work in Kenya "pro bono" or "through the back door".

The outcome of the December 27, 2007, elections in Kenya is still disputed due to allegations of electoral fraud and rigging by the incumbent president, Mwai Kibaki, the Party of National Unity and erroneous reporting by the Electoral Commission of Kenya (ECK). Massive protests and tribal tensions have since erupted between the president's Kikuyu tribe and the majority of other tribes not favorably aligned to the outcome. Major mediations have commenced between concerned parties, including possible formation of a coalition and/or interim government until reelections are held.

== Radio and TV host ==
Following the 2012 election, Morris did not appear on Fox News for almost three months. On February 5, 2013, Fox announced that it would not renew Morris' contract. In addition to his numerous inaccurate predictions, Morris had been criticized for accepting paid ads on his Website from candidates whom he discussed on the air, a clear conflict of interest.

Beginning in 2013, Morris' Super PAC For America disbursed approximately $1.7mm for "fundraising" to the television network, Newsmax. Emails from both Morris and Newsmax were paid for by Super PAC for America. Some media outlets speculate that Morris took advantage of Super PAC For America donations by paying Newsmax for fundraising which in turn paid Morris large sums of money to 'rent' his email list. Morris was a regular guest on multiple Newsmax shows, such as American Agenda, Greg Kelly Reports and Spicer & Co.. In 2021, Morris launched a weekly half-hour show on Newsmax TV, Dick Morris Democracy.

Morris was host of a daily radio talk show on WPHT in Philadelphia, Pennsylvania, from 2013 to 2015. Morris cited his desire to campaign for 2016 Republican candidates as his reason for leaving. In 2021, Morris launched a one-hour radio program on WABC in New York City, airing from noon to 2 PM on Sunday afternoons with co-host Doug DiPierro.

== Film ==
Morris has appeared in, and wrote the screenplay for, the documentary film FahrenHYPE 9/11. The film was a response to Michael Moore's 2004 film, Fahrenheit 9/11.

== Personal life and tax problems ==
Morris is married to author Eileen McGann, who is a Catholic. Morris was a non-practicing Jew and later converted to Catholicism.

He failed to pay a variety of state and federal taxes beginning in 1996. In 2010, he declared that he had reached an agreement with the State of Connecticut, and that he is committed to paying his taxes: "Following a difficult period in my life, I fell into arrears. But since then, I have paid almost $3 million in state and federal taxes." In 2012, the lien that had been placed on his house was lifted.

== Books ==
Morris has written several books, many co-authored with his wife, Eileen McGann. He authored Condi vs. Hillary in which he argues that only Condoleezza Rice could block Hillary Clinton's anticipated 2008 bid for the White House.

Rewriting History was published in May 2004 as a rebuttal to Hillary Clinton's book, Living History (ISBN 0-7432-2224-5). In it, he argues that Hillary Clinton has presented a false "nice" persona in the book. Morris instead remembers her as manipulative, cold, and single-minded in her pursuit of power. Similarly, Morris and McGann wrote Because He Could in response to Bill Clinton's memoir My Life (ISBN 0-375-41457-6).

=== Bibliography ===
- Behind the Oval Office: Winning the Presidency in the Nineties (1997) ISBN 1-58063-053-7
- Vote.com: How Big-Money Lobbyists and the Media Are Losing Their Influence, and the Internet Is Giving Power Back to the People (1999) ISBN 978-1580631051
- The New Prince: Machiavelli Updated for the Twenty-First Century (2000) ISBN 978-1580630795
- Power Plays: Win or Lose – How History's Great Political Leaders Play the Game (2002) ISBN 978-0060004439
- Off With Their Heads: Traitors, Crooks & Obstructionists in American Politics, Media & Business (2003) ISBN 978-0060559281
- Rewriting History (2004) ISBN 0-06-073668-2
- Because He Could (2004, with Eileen McGann) ISBN 0-06-078415-6
- Condi vs. Hillary: The Next Great Presidential Race (2005, with Eileen McGann) ISBN 0-06-083913-9
- Outrage: How Illegal Immigration, the United Nations, Congressional Ripoffs, Student Loan Overcharges, Tobacco Companies, Trade Protection, and Drug Companies are Ripping Us Off ...And What to Do About It (2007, with Eileen McGann) ISBN 978-0061195402
- Catastrophe: How Obama, Congress, and the Special Interests Are Transforming a Slump Into a Crash, Freedom Into Socialism, and a Disaster Into a Catastrophe ...and How to Fight Back (2008, with Eileen McGAnn) ISBN 978-0061771040
- Fleeced: How Barack Obama, Media Mockery of Terrorist Threats, Liberals Who Want To Kill Talk Radio, the Do-Nothing Congress, Companies That Help Iran, and Washington Lobbyists for Foreign Governments Are Scamming Us...And What To Do About It (2008, with Eileen McGann) ISBN 978-0-06-171866-3
- Revolt! How to Defeat Obama and Repeal His Socialist Programs (2011, with Eileen McGann) ISBN 978-0062073303
- Screwed: How Foreign Countries Are Ripping America Off and Plundering Our Economy-and How Our Leaders Help Them Do It (2012, with Eileen McGann) ISBN 978-0062196699
- Here Come the Black Helicopters!: UN Global Governance and the Loss of Freedom (2012, with Eileen McGann) ISBN 978-0062240590
- Armageddon: How Trump Can Beat Hillary (2016, with Eileen McGann) ISBN 978-1630060589
- Rogue Spooks: The Intelligence War on Donald Trump (2017, with Eileen McGann) ISBN 9781250167866
- The Return: Trump's Big 2024 Comeback (2022) ISBN 978-1630062071
- CORRUPT: The Inside Story of Biden's Dark Money (2023) ISBN 978-1630062781
- The Second Shining: Trump's Return to Radically Remake America Forever (2025) ISBN 978-1630063184
- The Real Charlie Kirk (2025) ISBN 978-1630063511
