= Eileen McGann =

Eileen McGann may refer to:

- Eileen McGann (author), American political writer
- Eileen McGann (musician), Celtic musician
