= ActivePure =

American air purifier manufacturer

ActivePure Technologies, LLC
- Industry: Air and surface purification, floor care, healthcare infection prevention, water filtration and treatment
- Founded: 1924 as Electrolux Corp. USA
- Headquarters: Dallas, TX
- Owner: Joseph P. Urso
- Website: activepure.com

ActivePure Technologies, LLC is a private technology manufacturing company headquartered in Dallas, Texas. With its main facilities in Bristol, Virginia, the company creates air purifiers for distributors. Many of these products contain photohydrolysis-based purification cells, which the company refers to as ActivePure Technology. ActivePure sells to distributors in 72 countries. As of 2021, Aerus Holdings changed its name to ActivePure Technologies.

== History ==
Founded in 1924 by Gustaf Sahlin as Electrolux USA, the company principally produced long-lasting, repairable canister vacuums for both door-to-door salesmen and retail distribution.

The company was acquired by an investment group led by Joseph P. Urso in 1998. Urso renamed the company Aerus Holdings LLC to reflect a focus air purification products. The company later introduced water purification to its product line.

In 2015, the Southern California Gas Company purchased 10,000 RCI-based air purifiers from Aerus to assist residents during the Aliso Canyon gas leak.

In 2017, Aerus's engineering team presented a new version of RCI technology which the company named ActivePure. ActivePure was inducted into the Space Foundation's Space Technology Hall of Fame later that year. The Hall of Fame recognizes technologies that improve life on Earth after being originally developed for space.

In 2020, ActivePure Medical was created to focus on purifiers for healthcare facilities during the COVID-19 pandemic. The Aerus Medical Guardian, renamed the ActivePure Medical Guardian, was certified as a Class II Medical Device by the FDA.

In 2021, Aerus Holdings changed its name to ActivePure Technologies LLC, after its core technology.

During the COVID-19 pandemic, the company expanded its executive team. Its most high-profile hiring was the appointment of former Whitehouse Coronavirus Response Coordinator Dr. Deborah Birx as its Chief Medical and Science advisor.

In 2023, a peer-reviewed study reported a 3-fold reduction of airborne SARS-CoV-2 virus in the rooms of COVID patients using purifiers manufactured by ActivePure.

In 2024, a peer-reviewed study reported the total elimination of hospital-acquired MRSA infections in ICUs using purifiers manufactured by ActivePure.

== Technology ==
The company's technology is descended from a photocatalysis-based device developed by the Wisconsin Center for Space Automation and Robotics called the "ethylene scrubber" which was first used in the space shuttle Columbia. ActivePure's version uses a UV bulb, a proprietary catalyst, and a patented honeycomb matrix. The company refers to its technology as photohydrolysis. Earlier versions of the technology were referred to as Radiant Catalytic Ionization.

ActivePure points to two peer-reviewed studies as evidence of the efficacy of its technology in the field, in addition to its results in the laboratory.

== Related companies ==
ActivePure is owned by the same group as some of its distributors.

- Air Scrubber is ActivePure's HVAC distribution arm. It focuses on in-duct and portable systems.
- ActivePure Medical is a dedicated division within ActivePure Technologies. The division focuses on healthcare and healthcare-related markets.
- Aerus is a franchise-based distributor of ActivePure products. It sells other air purifiers, portable heaters, water treatment systems, and vacuum cleaners.
