= Brandi Britton =

American professor known for being arrested for prostitution

Brandi M. Britton
- Born: August 8, 1963
- Died: January 30, 2007 (aged 43); Maryland
- Education: University of California, San Francisco
- Occupation: Professor

Brandi Britton (August 8, 1963 – January 30, 2007) was a professor of sociology and anthropology. She worked at University of Maryland, Baltimore County, resigning in 1999. In January 2006, she was arrested on charges of prostitution.

Britton claimed she was innocent, and was being framed by an angry ex-husband. Darragh Johnson, The Washington Post writer who interviewed her, asserted that the charges she faced were misdemeanors, and "rarely go to trial."

== Career ==
Britton enrolled at Oregon State University when she was 19. She married, and had two children, a son and a daughter, in 1985 and 1987. Johnson interviewed Sheila Cordray, one of Britton's professors, who said Britton was one of the most brilliant students of her entire academic career.

While at Oregon State, Britton volunteered at a battered women's shelter, and helped organize a late-night ride program, for women's safety.

She earned her PhD at the University of California at San Francisco in 1993. She took a job on the faculty, at the University of Maryland, Baltimore County in the mid-1990s. According to Johnson, at first she was widely admired — even bringing a $1.5 million research grant from the National Institute of Health to the university — but her last years at the university were filled with acrimony; there were lawsuits, and she ended up resigning.

== Marriage ==
Johnson described Britton's second marriage as troubled, lasting only six months, with Britton making many calls to the police, reporting domestic violence. Britton had serious financial troubles after she left the university, filing bankruptcy twice, and facing foreclosure five times.

Johnson described her website AlexisAngel.com, and the services it offered, and described her being evasive when asked to reconcile her website with her denial of being a prostitute.

== Death ==
After she was identified as a prostitute, Britton committed suicide. Various commentators reflected on Deborah Jeane Palfrey's reaction to Britton's suicide, when she too was found dead, an apparent suicide. Palfrey had said that she wouldn't kill herself, as Britton had.

In his book about Palfrey's case, Why Just Her?, Palfrey's lawyer, Montgomery Blair Sibley, acknowledged that Britton had worked for Palfrey's firm. But he wrote that Palfrey had only employed Britton for about six months, in the 1990s. Blair noted that Britton, like his client, had said her clients included "police, lawyers and judges".

The Baltimore Sun reported that her house had been sold, in a foreclosure, in November 2006, and the new owners were in the process of evicting her, in order to get possession of their new property, at the time of her death.

Some commentators have suggested that both women were murdered, and their deaths made to look like suicide.
