= International Relations Council =

Educational organization in Kansas City, Missouri

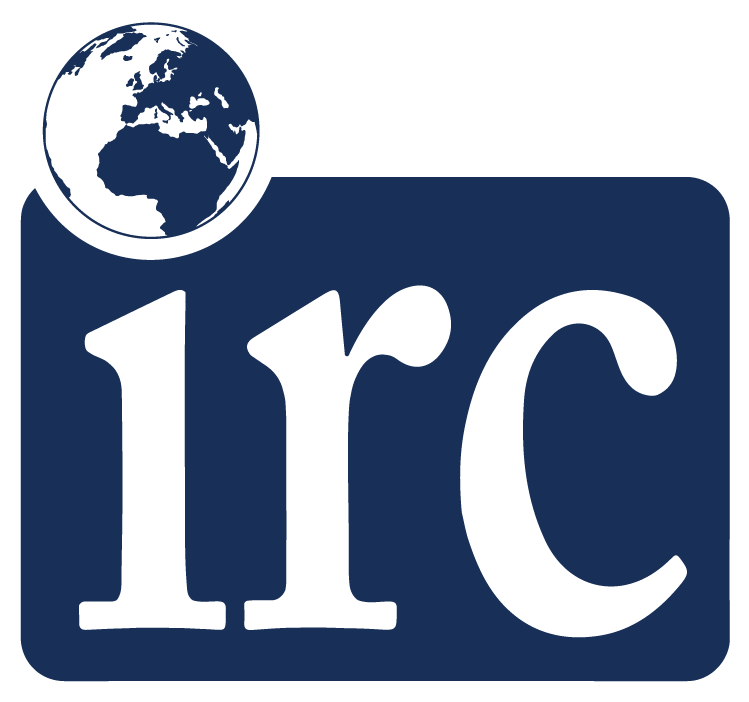
International Relations Council logo

The International Relations Council (IRC) is a non-profit (501(c)(3)) non-partisan educational organization in Kansas City, Missouri, and a member of the World Affairs Councils of America. As an educational nonprofit, the IRC works in partnership with a range of businesses, universities, community organizations, K-12 schools, and other interested individuals to grow a global perspective and find international connections within the Greater Kansas City metropolitan area. The IRC works to foster interest in an understanding of international affairs among the citizens of Kansas City through the development of various programs and events. As a membership organization, the IRC welcomes individuals and families, businesses, universities, and other organizations to join as IRC members in order to help sustain global-affairs education in the Kansas City community and receive various benefits.

== History ==
The International Relations Council was founded in late December 1954 by Eliot Berkley, who served as executive director of the IRC for nearly forty years and, later, as chairman of the IRC Academy and lifetime board member of the IRC. After graduating from Harvard University in 1947, Eliot earned an M.A. (1949) and Ph.D. (1952) from Princeton University. Returning to his hometown, Eliot taught history and government at the University of Kansas City, now UMKC. He then taught social science at the Kansas City Art Institute, where he later served as vice president for development from 1960 to 1961 and dean of the college from 1961 to 1965. As an advocate of citizen involvement in the foreign policy process, Dr. Berkley served as executive director of the International Relations Council for nearly forty years and, later, as chairman of the IRC Academy and lifetime board member of the IRC. For many years, his wife Marcia worked side by side with Eliot, hosting dinners and meetings in their home. Eliot died in 2012 but is still remembered fondly by business, community, and academic leaders for his inspirational passion for global issues.

The IRC welcomed Eleanor Roosevelt as its first speaker in January 1955. Since then, a wide range of legislators, professors, journalists, diplomats, and other global-affairs experts have visited Kansas City to share their perspective and expertise. These notable guests include Henry Kissinger (1975), Jim Lehrer (1986), Robert J. Eaton (1993), Madeleine Albright (2006), Condoleezza Rice (2010), and Janet Napolitano (2014).

Since its beginning, the IRC has grown from a small "kitchen table" gathering to an educational organization with a large number of Kansas City area members. With Matthew Hughes serving as the current executive director, the IRC warmly welcomes involvement in IRC events and programs from citizens of the Greater Kansas City area.

== Leadership ==
CEO/Executive Director (July 2016 – Present)

Matthew Hughes

Program Manager

Evan Verploegh

Education Outreach Coordinator VISTA

Natalie Friend

2022 Board Officers

Dr. Karenbeth G. Zacharias - President

Andrea Allison-Putman - First Vice President

Dr. Michael Makara - Second Vice President

Aaron J. Mann - Secretary

David B. Au - Treasurer

Board Members

Christina Arnone, Michelle Arthington, Dr. Charles A. S. Bankart, Anna Bazan-Munguia, Narbeli Galindo, Philip Gaskin, Nicole Gresham Perry, Kelvin Igumbor, Frank J. Klimas, Nancy C. Messer, Shahid S. Qadri, Dr. Usha Saha, Dave Saunders, Herb Sih, Jorge Soberón Hernández, Stephen Steigman, Paul Weida

2022 Advisory Directors

Kirk Doan, Holly Nielsen, Cyprienne Simchowitz, Mike Wood

== Finances ==
The IRC is a not-for-profit 501(c)(3) organization. It is funded almost entirely by memberships, both individual and corporate, donations, program fees and some small grants. Memberships can be purchased on an annual basis. IRC members receive free admission to most IRC events. IRC member universities & corporations can also attend select events.

== Programs ==
=== Eliot S. Berkley Lectures ===
The Eliot S. Berkley Lecture was founded in 1996 and brought an expert in foreign policy and global affairs to the Kansas City area. The lecture was established through the Berkley Endowment to honor the IRC’s founder and his decades of service and to provide a platform for engaging community members in understanding critical global issues. Past Berkley lecturers include former U.S. Ambassador Robert Ford (2014), Gerald Seib (2011), The Honorable Thomas R. Pickering (2005), and Admiral William J. Crowe, Jr. (1998).

==== List of past Eliot S. Berkley Lectures ====
- 2020 Dr. Paul Salem President of the Middle East Institute
- 2019 Ambassador Paula Dobriansky Senior Fellow in the Future of Diplomacy Project at Harvard's JFK Belfer Center for Science and International Affairs
- 2018 Kate Charlet Director Technology and International Affairs Program, Carnegie Endowment for International Peace
- 2017 Evans Revere Former U.S. Diplomat and Former CEO of the Korea Society
- 2016 Col. Nicolas Auboin French Liaison Officer for the Combined Arms Center
- 2015 Deana Arsenian Vice President of the Carnegie Corporation of New York
- 2014 Robert Ford Former U.S. Ambassador to Syria
- 2013 Daniel Markey Senior Fellow at the Council on Foreign Relations and author of No Exit from Pakistan
- 2012 Charles Kupchan Senior Fellow at the Council on Foreign Relations and professor at Georgetown University
- 2011 Gerald Seib Washington Bureau Chief of the Wall Street Journal
- 2010 George Friedman Founder and CEO of STRATFOR
- 2009 Dr. Allison Stanger Russell Leng Professor of International Politics and Economics and Director of the Rohatyn Center for International Affairs at Middlebury College
- 2007 Walter Russell Mead Henry A. Kissinger Senior Fellow for U.S. foreign policy, Council on Foreign Relations
- 2006 Dr. George Rupp President and CEO, International Rescue Committee
- 2005 The Honorable Thomas R. Pickering Former U.S. Ambassador to Jordan, Nigeria, El Salvador, Israel, United Nations, India, Russia
- 2004 The Honorable Lawrence J. Korb Senior Fellow, American Progress and Senior Advisor, Center for Defense Information
- 2003 James Fallows National Correspondent, Atlantic Monthly
- 2002 The Honorable Marc Grossman Under Secretary of State for Political Affairs
- 2001 The Honorable Princeton N. Lyman Former U.S. ambassador to South Africa and Nigeria and former Assistant Secretary of State for International Organization Affairs
- 2000 The Honorable Frank G. Wisner Vice Chairman, American International Group
- 1999 Hodding Carter III Journalist, Assistant Secretary of State for Carter Administration
- 1998 Admiral William J. Crowe, Jr. Former Chairman of the Joint Chiefs of Staff, former U.S. ambassador to the United Kingdom
- 1997 "Mid-Point in the Legacy" Conference and Celebration of the 50th Anniversary of the Marshall Plan
- 1996 The Honorable Jack F. Matlock, Jr. Former U.S. ambassador to Czechoslovakia and the Soviet Union

=== IRC Networking Hours ===
IRC Networking Hours give IRC members and friends the chance to get to know each other and to learn about international opportunities in the IRC organizational partners' many different professional fields. The first IRC Networking Hour of 2017 took place on March 22, where attendees took a visit to Burns & McDonnell, an engineering, architecture, and consulting firm with both domestic and international projects. On August 2, attendees learned about the nationwide work of Commerce Bank and had plenty of time to network. At the final IRC Networking Hour of 2017 on October 9, attendees had a chance to meet employees of Bio-Microbics, a manufacturer of wastewater treatment systems with over 60,000 installations in over 70 countries. The IRC sees great value in allowing members of the Kansas City community the chance to network with internationally interested organizations, as it creates opportunities for further global connections within Kansas City.

=== IRC Lecture Series ===
IRC Lecture Series bring dignitaries, foreign-policy experts, and regional leaders together to discuss, debate, and engage the Kansas City area community in issues of international scope and local relevance.

Some of the IRC's recent programs include:

- Where Does Venezuela Go From Here? with David Smolansky, the youngest mayor in Venezuela's history, living in exile since September 2017
- An Evening with H.E. Dr. Asad Majeed Khan, Amb. of Pakistan to the U.S.
- Populism and Nationalism on the Rise: A German Perspective with Stefan Schlüter

=== Speakers Bureau ===
The International Relations Council's Speakers Bureau is a collection of IRC members willing to share their expertise and experiences with the Greater Kansas City area. Speakers have knowledge of the historical and contemporary aspects of specific countries, foreign policy, geography, and culture. The members of the Bureau don’t charge a fee for their speaking time and are available to the Greater Kansas City area (but it is ultimately their decision where to travel).

=== Discussion Groups ===
==== Great Decisions ====
Great Decisions is a program produced by the Foreign Policy Association and offered in Kansas City through the IRC. Across Kansas and Missouri, people participating in Great Decisions gather in homes, libraries, and community centers to discuss some of the most pressing issues facing our world. Groups receive and study Great Decisions briefing books, which are well-researched, written materials that help guide discussion throughout the year. Each discussion is led by a Discussion Group Leader. However, participants play the most important role, and their interest, enthusiasm, and commitment ultimately determine the success of the group. Each participant's point of view carries equal weight and everyone is encouraged to share opinions and ideas. The topics change annually, and these discussions strengthen people's understanding of global issues and build connections in the Kansas City community.

==== News & Views ====
News & Views, a conversation-based series from the International Relations Council, brings together a small group of community members for respectful, substantive discussion around one of that week’s top international news stories. Facilitated by a member or friend of the International Relations Council, the group meets in different informal settings around town, like a happy hour on the Country Club Plaza, or on Zoom for a guided conversation about a topic and articles that participants review in advance.

==== Global Affairs Book Club ====
The Global Affairs Book Club gives participants the opportunity to discuss foreign affairs, global topics, authors' perspectives, historical events, and their current local relevance in a respectful, engaging setting. Convened by seasoned Great Decisions leader Jack McLaren, the group meets every six to eight weeks to dig into a different author's work. Recent books discussed include Ten Lessons for a Post-Pandemic World by Fareed Zakaria, We Crossed a Bridge and it Trembled by Wendy Pearlman, and Modi and the Reinvention of Indian Foreign Policy by Ian Hall.

=== Choices Election Issues Series ===
In the eight weeks leading up to November 3, 2020, the International Relations Council offered a series of insightful conversations with notable experts on foreign policy issues relevant to the 2020 U.S. presidential election and what comes next. Rather than advocate a particular approach or outcome, the nonpartisan Choices series informed voters through a presentation of historical context and a detailed examination of the foreign policy platforms of the major-party candidates. Topics included Tariffs and Trade with Amb. Ron Kirk, The Transatlantic Relationship with Erik Brattberg, and Peace in the Middle East with Amb. Frank G. Wisner.

=== Lexicon Language Intros ===
The International Relations Council's Lexicon Language Intro program is a weekly digital interactive program introducing participants to a new language. Each week, IRC members and friends offer some history and context on a different language, let participants sample the look and sounds of the language, and provide information on where participants can experience more of the language and the cultures it represents. Recent programs include Armenian with Armen Babajanian, Swahili with Wasim Khan, and Norwegian with Lise Falskow.

== School Programs ==
The IRC devotes a large portion of its resources to programs for teachers and students. IRC programs aim to promote global and cross-cultural awareness and to inspire a passion for international studies.

=== Eliot S. Berkley Award ===
Each year, in memory of the IRC founder and longtime executive director, Eliot S. Berkley, the International Relations Council presents this award to an exceptional high-school junior or senior who has demonstrated superior academic interest and competence in international studies. Finalists are selected by a committee of IRC members. After personal interviews with the finalists, the winner is selected and is presented an inscribed award and a $500 scholarship at an IRC fall event.

=== Academic WorldQuest ===
Each year since 2006, the IRC has offered high-school students the chance to showcase their knowledge of world affairs, geography, history, and current events at this event. Each Greater Kansas City area high school may enter one team of four students plus a faculty sponsor, and participation is entirely cost-free. The winning team will receive an expenses-paid trip to Washington, D.C. for the students and their sponsor to represent Kansas City in the national Academic WorldQuest competition. WorldQuest is a copyrighted program of the World Affairs Councils of America and approximately 4,000 students across the country participate in competitions hosted by over 40 local World Affairs Councils in 26 states.

=== International Classroom Partnership Program (ICPP) ===
The ICPP is a program which sends international students from several Kansas City area colleges and universities to visit elementary schools to share their life and culture with school children. International college students share facts about their home countries' language, dress, and etiquette with American students. The program aims to dispel stereotypes of other nations while sparking an interest in foreign languages and cultures in elementary-aged children. The International Classroom Partnership Program ended in 2010.

== Global Honors Evening ==
In 1984, the IRC began its annual Awards Banquet, now known as the Global Honors Evening. Each year, the IRC recognizes individuals or organizations for various contributions – to foreign policy and global affairs, international commerce, or the Kansas City community. The IRC awards the Distinguished Service Award for International Statesmanship to an individual who has made outstanding contributions in international commerce, diplomacy, education or understanding and who has a connection to Missouri or Kansas. The IRC also presents awards for Contributions to International Commerce and/or Community Service and for Academic Leadership. The 2020 Global Honors Evening was placed on hold due to COVID-19.

=== Past awardees ===
==== Distinguished Service Award for International Statesmanship ====
- 2019 Amb. Deborah Birx, M.D., Coordinator of the United States Government Activities to Combat HIV/AIDS and U.S. Special Representative for Global Health Diplomacy
- 2018 Amb. William J. Burns, President, Carnegie Endowment for International Peace; former Deputy Secretary of State
- 2017 Gen. Richard Myers, President, Kansas State University; former Chair of the Joint Chiefs of Staff
- 2015 Noel Lateef President and CEO of the Foreign Policy Association
- 2014 Janet Napolitano former U.S. Secretary of Homeland Security
- 2013 Neal Conan National Public Radio reporter, editor, and former senior host of Talk of the Nation
- 2012 David Petraeus Director of the Central Intelligence Agency
- 2011 Christopher R. Hill former US Ambassador to Iraq and Assistant Secretary of State for East Asian and Pacific Affairs
- 2010 Reza Aslan author, No god but God, and political commentator
- 2009 C. Fred Bergsten Director, Peterson Institute for International Economics
- 2008 Strobe Talbott President, Brookings Institution
- 2007 Senator Chuck Hagel U.S. Senator, Nebraska
- 2006 Madeleine Albright former Secretary of State
- 2005 Senator John Danforth former U.S. Senator, Missouri; former Ambassador to the United Nations
- 2004 Senator Sam Brownback U.S. Senator, Kansas
- 2003 Robert M. Gates President, Texas A&M University; former Director of Central Intelligence Agency
- 2002 Dan Glickman Head, Institute of Politics, John F. Kennedy School of Government; former Secretary of Agriculture; former Congressman
- 2001 Alan N. Mulally President and CEO, Boeing Commercial Airplanes
- 2000 Kenton W. Keith Senior Vice President and Director, Programming Division, Meridian International Center
- 1999 Stephen G. Butler Chairman and CEO, KPMG Peat Marwick, LLP
- 1998 Marshall Loeb Managing Editor, Fortune and Money
- 1997 James B. Steele Senior Writer-at-large, Time Inc.
- 1996 Byron Calame Deputy Managing Editor, The Wall Street Journal
- 1995 Delano E. Lewis President and CEO, National Public Radio
- 1994 Roger Morris author, syndicated columnist, White House and National Security staff for Presidents Nixon and Johnson
- 1993 Robert J. Eaton Chairman and CEO, Chrysler Corporation
- 1992 Robert F. Ellsworth Chairman, Council for the International Institute for Strategic Studies; former Deputy Secretary of Defense
- 1991 John McManus Editor-in-chief, Time-Warner, Inc.
- 1990 Bill Kurtis Executive Producer, The New Explorers; former co-anchor, CBS News
- 1989 Charles H. Price II former Ambassador to the Kingdom of Belgium and United Kingdom
- 1988 William Atkins McWhirter Senior Correspondent, Time Magazine
- 1987 Senator Nancy Landon Kassebaum U.S. Senator, Kansas
- 1987 Senator Thomas F. Eagleton former U.S. Senator, Missouri
- 1986 Jim Lehrer host, Lehrer Newshour
- 1985 U. Alexis Johnson former Undersecretary of State for Political Affairs
- 1984 William G. Hyland editor, Foreign Affairs; former Deputy Assistant to the President for International Security Affairs

==== Award for Academic Leadership ====
- 2019 Dr. Sarah Finocchario Kessler, associate professor, University of Kansas Medical Center
- 2017 University of Missouri–Kansas City, Dean Kevin Truman, accepting
- 2009 Stowers Institute, William Neaves, accepting
- 2008 KU Confucius Institute, Sheri Willis, accepting
- 2007 Richard Derman, M.D., M.P.H. Associate Dean for Women's Health at UMKC
- 2006 Beverly Byers-Pevitts President, Park University
- 2003 Paul and Colleen Nance Founders, Nance Museum and Library of Middle Eastern Art
- 2002 Gary Armstrong, Ph.D. Chair, Department of Political Science, William Jewell College
- 2001 Hal Jehle Secondary Resource Specialist, Shawnee Mission School District
- 2000 Maria Carlson, Ph.D. Director, Center for Russian and East European Studies, The University of Kansas
- 1999 KCPT Public Television 19 William T. Reed, accepting
- 1998 John E. Cleek, Ph.D. Director, Center for International Business, Bloch School of Business and Public Administration, UMKC
- 1997 Nelson-Atkins Museum of Art Marc F. Wilson, accepting
- 1996 Terry Rodenberg, Ed.D. Director, International Program, Central Missouri State University
- 1995 Janet R. Baird, Ph.D. Program Administrator, Southeast Magnet High School for International Studies
- 1994 George Woodyard, Ph.D. Dean of International Studies, The University of Kansas
- 1993 Carolyn J. Kadel Director of International Education, Johnson County Community College
- 1992 Paul A. Garcia, Ph.D. Instructional Specialist for Language and International Studies, Kansas City Missouri School District
- 1991 Henry A. Mitchell Professor and Associate Vice Chancellor, Academic and International Affairs, UMKC
- 1990 Miyo Wagner Visiting Instructor of Japanese Language, Rockhurst College
- 1989 E. Grey Dimond, M.D. Provost Emeritus, Health Sciences, UMKC
- 1987 Ed Chasteen Professor of Sociology and Anthropology, William Jewell College
- 1986 David Wolfe Director, Social Studies, Shawnee Mission School District
- 1985 Harry L. Klut Social studies teacher, Paseo High School, Kansas City School District
- 1984 Joyce Cox Social studies teacher, Center High School, Center School District

==== Award for Contributions to International Commerce and/or Community Service ====
- 2019 Swope Health, Jeron Ravin, president and CEO, accepting
- 2018 City of Kansas City, Missouri, Scott Wagner, Mayor Pro Tem, accepting
- 2017 Greater Kansas City Consular Corps, Dean Harry McLear, accepting
- 2016 A. Zahner Company Robert Zahner, Senior Vice President, accepting
- 2015 Henry Bloch Co-Founder and Chairman Emeritus of H&R Block
- 2014 Julián Zugazagoitia President and CEO of the Nelson-Atkins Museum of Art
- 2013 R. Crosby Kemper III Executive Director of the Kansas City Public Library
- 2012 Sporting Kansas City Greg Cotton, Chief of Staff, accepting
- 2011 Consul Jacob Prado Consul General of Mexico at Kansas City
- 2010 Seaboard Corporation Robert Steer, Senior Vice President and CFO, accepting
- 2009 Danny O'Neill President and Owner, the Roasterie
- 2008 Len Rodman President, Chairman, and CEO, Black & Veatch
- 2004 Consul General Takao Shibata Consulate General of Japan at Kansas City
- 2004 Benny Lee Chairman and CEO, Top Innovations, Inc.
- 2003 Dr. Min H. Kao President and CEO, Garmin International; Co-founder and co-chairman, Garmin Corporation
- 2002 Michael R. Haverty Chairman, President and CEO, Kansas City Southern Industries
- 2001 Lillian Gonzalez Pardo, M.D. Medical Director, TEVA Neuroscience; Clinical Professor of Pediatrics and Neurology, KU Medical Center; President, Filipino Cultural Center Foundation
- 2000 Dr. Richard W. Harriman Founder and Director, Harriman Arts Program, William Jewell College
- 1999 Jeffrey W. Colyer Plastic and Reconstructive Surgery Center
- 1998 John P. McMeel Chairman, Andrews McMeel Universal
- 1997 Stanley H. Durwood Chairman and CEO, AMC Theatres.
- 1996 Anne and Norman Burkart President and Director, Language Link
- 1995 William D. Chapman President, Butler International
- 1994 Lawrence D. Starr President and CEO, Koch Supplies.
- 1993 Gary B. Morsch, M.D. Founder and Chairman, Heart to Heart International
- 1992 Morton I. Sosland Chairman, Sosland Publishing
- 1991 Robert A. Cushman President, ARMCO Worldwide Grinding Systems; Vice President, ARMCO Inc.
- 1990 James L. Rainey President and CEO, Farmland Industries
- 1989 William T. Esrey President and CEO, United Telecom and Sprint
- 1988 John T. Pierson, Jr. President, PRECO Industries
- 1987 Heinz K. Wehner Group Vice President and General Manager, Agricultural Chemical Division, Mobay Corp.
- 1986 Allen M. Acheson President, Black & Veatch International
- 1985 Stanley A. Hamilton President, Hallmark International; Honorary British Consul
- 1985 James E. Burke Late Honorary Consul of Japan
- 1984 Rod Turnbull Director of Public Affairs, Kansas City Board of Trade

== Affiliations ==
The International Relations Council is one of more than 90 organizations in the U.S. affiliated with the World Affairs Councils of America (WACA). WACA is the largest non-profit organization in the United States dedicated to fostering grassroots understanding of and engagement in international affairs.
