= GHSD =

GHSD may refer to:

- Bureau of Global Health Security and Diplomacy
- Galt Joint Union High School District
