= Catastrophe (Morris and McGann book) =

2009 book

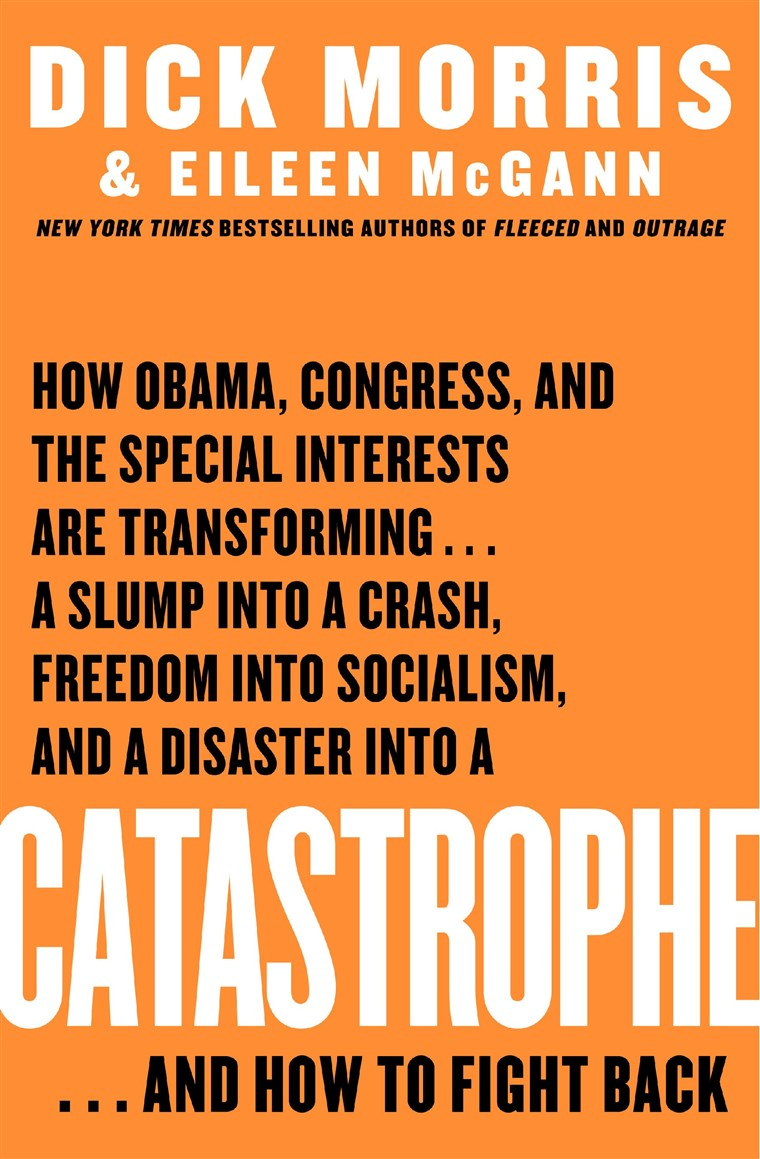
- First edition cover
- Author: Dick Morris; Eileen McGann
- Language: English
- Subject: Business & Economics; Economic Conditions; Barack Obama
- Publisher: HarperCollins
- Publication date: 2009
- Publication place: United States
- ISBN: 9780061771040

Catastrophe: How Obama, Congress, and the Special Interests Are Transforming a Slump into a Crash, Freedom into Socialism, and a Disaster into a Catastrophe . . . and How to Fight Back is a 2009 book co-written by American political commentator Dick Morris and his wife Eileen McGann, which spells out hypothetical catastrophic consequences of the Barack Obama administration policies and shows how the Obama administration could be stopped.

== Reception ==
Catastrophe was number 1 on The New York Times Best Seller list for the first two weeks after its release, and was third in the July 2009 Poli-Book Best Seller List. It ranked number 6 in non-fiction on The Wall Street Journal's July Best Sellers listing.

Dana Larsen of Storm Lake Pilot Tribune writes that in the book, Morris accuses the Obama administration of "canceling the war on terror and replacing it with a war on prosperity". Larsen expands that Morris feels the administration's takeover of both banks and the auto industries, its compromising of the existing health care systems, its "enfranchising" of illegal aliens, and its relinquishing of personal liberties is creating a socialist state.

Preceded by Liberty and Tyranny by Mark R. Levin	#1 The New York Times Best Seller Non-Fiction; July 12, 2009 – August 1, 2009	Succeeded by Unmasked: The Final Years of Michael Jackson by Ian Halperin
