= Feature story =

Piece of non-fiction writing about news

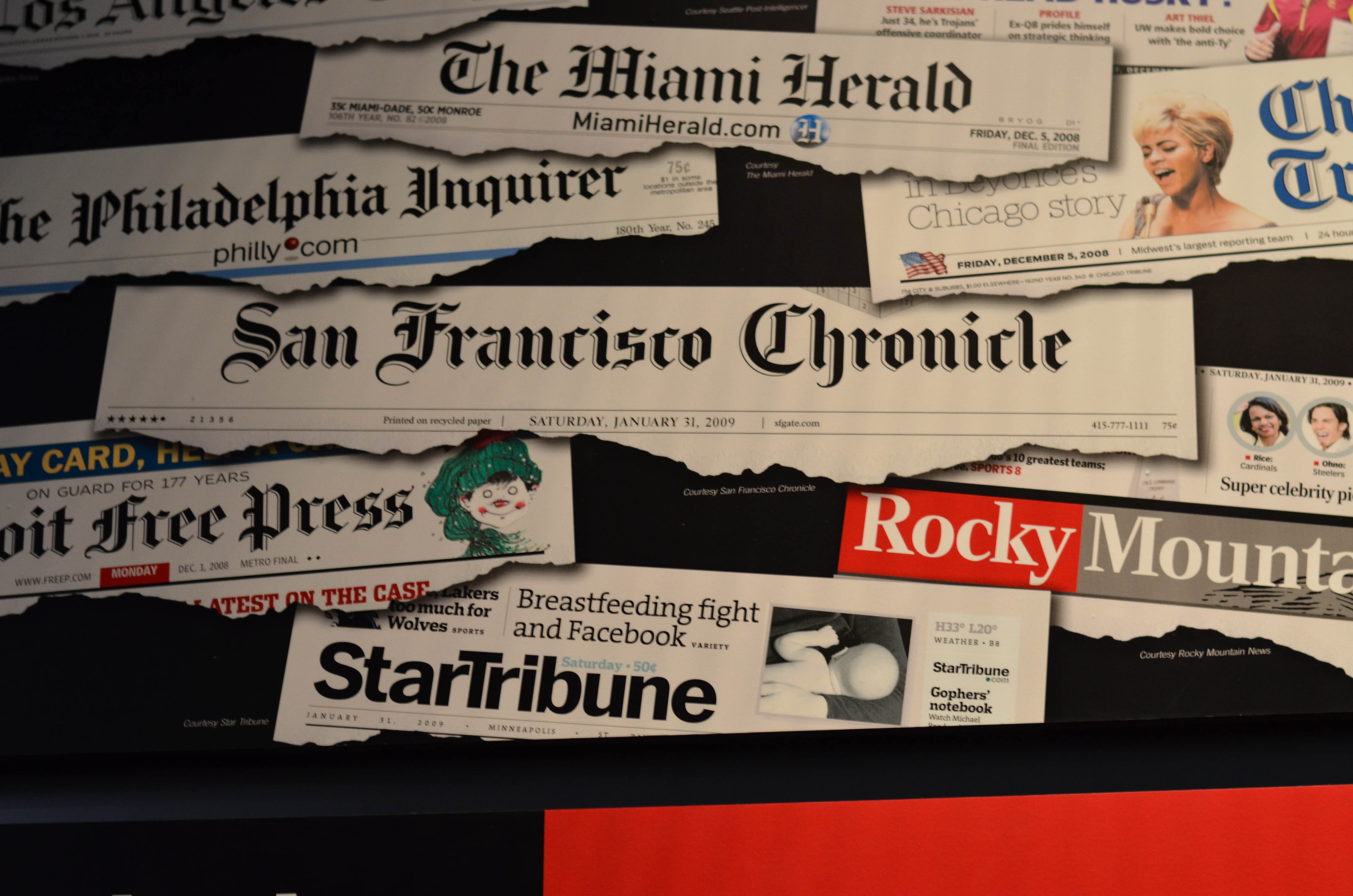
Mainstream Newspapers that contribute to both hard and soft news. Both informational and for entertainment purposes.

A feature story, feature article, or feature piece is a piece of non-fiction writing about news covering a single topic in detail. It is a type of soft news, primarily focused on entertainment rather than a higher level of professionalism. The main subtypes are the news feature and the human-interest story.

A feature story is distinguished from other types of non-news stories by the quality of the writing. They should be memorable for their reporting, crafting, creativity, and economy of expression. Unlike news reports that mainly focus on factual evidence, feature stories tend to be subjective. Features vary in style, focus, and structure but overall, maintain an entertaining tone rather than a strictly informative

== Style ==
A feature story differs from straight news reporting. It normally presents newsworthy events and information through a narrative story, complete with a plot and story characters. It differs from a short story primarily in that the content is not fictional. Like literature, the feature story relies upon creativity and subjectivity to make an emotional connection with the readers. It may also highlight some universal aspects of human nature. Unlike straight news, the feature story serves the purpose of entertaining the readers, in addition to informing them. Although truthful and based on good facts, they are less objective than straight news.

Unlike straight news, the subject of a feature story is usually not time sensitive. It generally features good news.

Feature stories are usually written in an active style, with an emphasis on lively, entertaining prose. Some forms, such as a color story, uses description as the main mode.

== Published features and news ==
Feature stories are stories with only one feature, but are creative and true. While the distinction between published features and news is often clear, when approached conceptually there are few hard boundaries between the two. It is quite possible to write a feature story in the style of a news story. Nevertheless, features do tend to take a more narrative approach, perhaps using opening paragraphs as scene-setting narrative hooks instead of the delivery of the most important facts. A feature story can be in a news article, a newspaper, and even online. News stories focus on facts about an event whereas feature stories analyze the significance of an event.

== Types ==
The feature is one of the most wide-ranging categories of journalism appearing in more than just newspaper articles. A feature tells more than just a story. It emphasizes a certain tone, whether that be entertaining, humorous, saddening, serious or light. It involves and engages readers to the creative, subjective, informative, or entering aspects of the article, differing from informative news.

Among sports writers, features tend to be either human-interest stories or personality profiles of sports figures. A profile presents information about a person, but it differs from a biography by focusing on the person's personality or anecdotes, rather than the factual data about birth, education, or major achievements. Features may also cover aspects of business, political matters, media and entertainment, etc. The level of seriousness and characteristics differing it from hard news can range.

== Transforming ideas into features ==
In order to create and write a feature, the idea of the writing can be very individualistic. Ideas are inevitably everywhere and in the surrounding environment you are in right now. Of course, many ideas become overlooked. What someone sees as ordinary or may consider a basic topic, may have the potential to become a feature story. All of which depends on the lens and viewpoint the writer looks through. Yet, the viewpoint a writer may have does have to be narrowed down, allowing for specification.

== Structuring a feature ==
Characteristics that attribute to feature stories include exploring a topic or issue that is of importance to the writer(s). Features follow the outlines of having a plot, a complication, if any, and a conclusion. Paragraph structures may vary. Unlike a newspaper article that is usually separated in a vertical grid pattern, features are separated into concise short paragraphs. The writer has control to convey their perspective, whether to make it angled in a certain direction or to be unbiased.

It is important to continuously acknowledge that the focus should also revolve around engaging the reader's imagination and portraying an engaging story. Of course, all while allowing the main statement of the feature to be understood.

"Put people into the story, tell a story and let the reader see and hear for him or herself." - Benton Patterson 1986

The Pavilion describes this structure as a "roller coaster" effect where the reader is purposely prepared for the focus statement and taken along a path describing characteristics, complications/conflicts, and then gently given the resolution with descriptions at the very end .

The intro to the Feature Story will outline the lead/purpose for your article. A statement highlights the focus and the body of the article is a great place to elaborate upon that focus. The body of the article can be broken down into smaller sections that allow the readers to identify complications and digest the resolution proposed by the writer. Feature stories end with a conclusion that does not necessarily persuade readers but rather reiterates the focus, giving them the entire experience of growth and gaining new knowledge throughout the entire piece.

== See also ==
- Documentary film
- Radio documentary
- Dictionary
- Language Arts
- Journalism
- Plot
- Setting
- Story
- Human interest story
- Evergreen content
