= Terry Lesser Morris =

- Born: Terry Lesser; 1914; New York City, New York
- Died: September 16, 1993 (aged 78–79); Manhattan, New York City
- Education: Hunter College
- Occupations: Freelance writer and author
- Children: Dick Morris

Terry Morris (February 19, 1914 – September 16, 1993) was a freelance magazine writer and former president of the American Society of Journalists and Authors. She also wrote short stories and published several books. She was the mother of former political consultant Dick Morris.

== Biographical details ==
Morris was born in New York City and was a graduate of Hunter College, where she received both a B.A. and an M.A. Before embarking on a writing career in 1945, she taught in the New York City Public Schools.

In 1967, McCall's magazine published her exclusive interview with Svetlana Alliluyeva, daughter of Joseph Stalin. Morris also had articles published in Redbook, Reader's Digest and Cosmopolitan. She was one of the early proponents of the confessional human interest story and said she took "considerable license with the facts that are given to me."

Her last book, published posthumously by her son, was called Confessions of a Freelance Writer: How I Got Started. In it, she describes herself as a "garbage pail" collecting casual remarks from others and shaping them into human interest stories about ordinary people in extraordinary circumstances.

She was married to Eugene J. Morris and was the mother of Dick Morris. Her son, in his writings, "recounts the First Lady's numerous kindnesses to his aging (and of course Jewish) parents."

== Selected works ==
- No Hiding Place (1942) Alfred A. Knopf
- Prose by Professionals: The Inside Story of the Magazine Article Writer's Craft (1961) Doubleday
- Confessions of a Freelance Writer: How I Got Started (2001) iUniverse, Inc. ISBN 0-595-19952-6
