= Deborah Birx =

American physician and diplomat

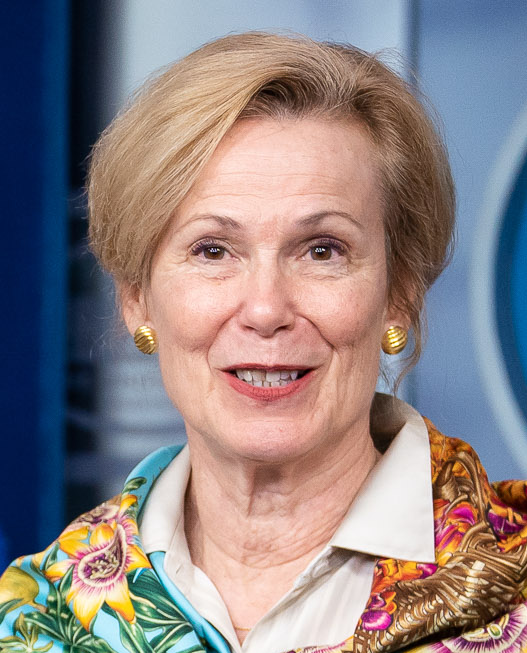
- Birx in 2020

White House Coronavirus Response Coordinator
- In office February 27, 2020 – January 20, 2021
- President: Donald Trump
- Preceded by: Position established
- Succeeded by: Jeff Zients

United States Special Representative for Global Health Diplomacy
- In office January 20, 2015 (Note: Office originally separate from that of Global AIDS Coordinator until their merge into the Office of the U.S. Global AIDS Coordinator and Health Diplomacy in 2015.) – January 20, 2021
- President: Barack Obama; Donald Trump
- Preceded by: Eric Goosby; Leslie V. Rowe (acting); Elizabeth Jordan (acting)
- Succeeded by: John Nkengasong

4th United States Global AIDS Coordinator
- In office April 4, 2014 – January 20, 2021
- President: Barack Obama; Donald Trump
- Deputy: Mark N. Brown; Angeli Achrekar
- Preceded by: Eric Goosby
- Succeeded by: John Nkengasong

Personal details
- Born: Deborah Leah Birx; April 4, 1956 (age 70) Carlisle, Pennsylvania, U.S.
- Spouse: Paige Reffe
- Relations: Donald Birx (brother)
- Children: 3
- Education: Houghton University (BS); Pennsylvania State University (MD)

Military service
- Allegiance: United States
- Branch/service: United States Army
- Years of service: 1980–1994 (reserve); 1994–2008 (active)
- Rank: Colonel
- Awards: Legion of Merit

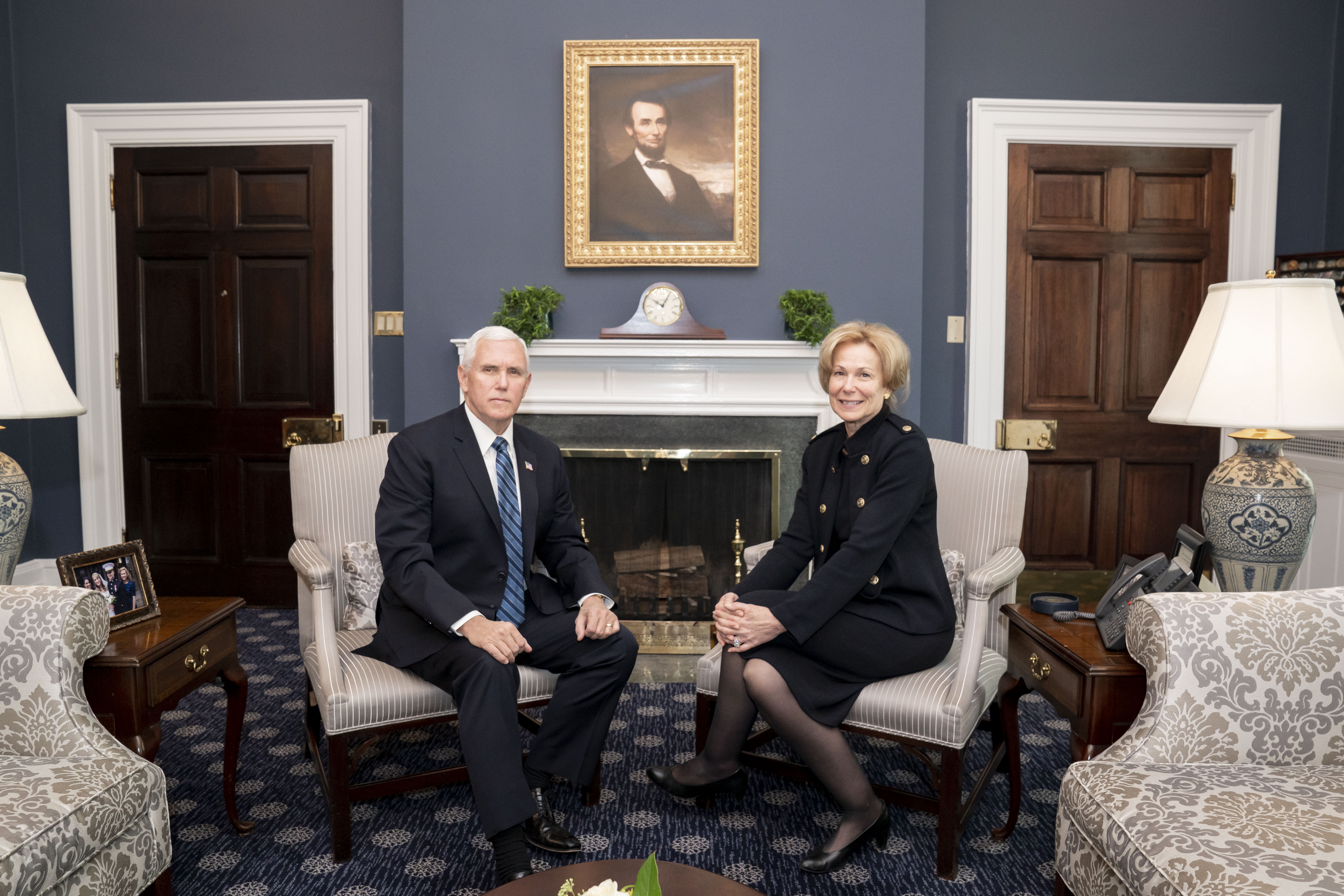
Birx with Vice President Mike Pence in March 2020

Deborah Leah Birx (born April 4, 1956) is an American physician and diplomat who served as the coordinator of the White House Coronavirus Task Force under President Donald Trump from 2020 to 2021. Birx specializes in HIV/AIDS immunology, vaccine research, and global health. Starting in 2014, she oversaw the implementation of the President's Emergency Plan for AIDS Relief (PEPFAR) program to support HIV/AIDS treatment and prevention programs in 65 countries. From 2014 to 2020, Birx was the United States global AIDS coordinator for presidents Barack Obama and Donald Trump and served as the United States special representative for global health diplomacy between 2015 and 2021. Birx was part of the White House Coronavirus Task Force from February 2020 to January 2021. In March 2021, Birx joined ActivePure Technologies as Chief Medical and Science Advisor.

== Early life and education ==
Birx was born in Pennsylvania. She is the daughter of Donald Birx, a mathematician and electrical engineer, and Adele Sparks Birx, a nursing instructor. Her late brother Danny was a scientist who founded a research company, and her older brother, Donald Birx, is president of Plymouth State University.

Her family lived in Lancaster County, Pennsylvania, where she attended Lampeter-Strasburg High School. Growing up, the siblings used a shed behind their family home as a makeshift lab for experiments in astronomy, geology, biology, and on one occasion, a homemade satellite dish antenna mounted on roller skates.

In Birx's sophomore year, she won third place at the Lancaster City-County Science Fair, and she was featured in a front-page story in the Lancaster New Era with the subheading: Girls Sweep Top 3 Prizes. She told the Intelligencer Journal that, "third is alright, but I'll be back. I want that first prize." Her junior year she competed in the International Science and Engineering Fair in San Diego. Her family later moved to Carlisle, Pennsylvania, and she attended Carlisle High for her final year of high school. During her senior year, she competed at the Capital Area Science Fair and was awarded the Grand Prize.

Birx received a Bachelor of Science degree in chemistry, completing her undergraduate studies in two years, at Houghton University (then Houghton College). In 1976, while enrolled at Hershey Medical School, Birx married fellow medical student and future cardiologist Bryan Dudley Raybuck, whom she had met at Houghton. In 1980, Birx earned a Doctor of Medicine from the Penn State Milton S. Hershey Medical Center.

== Career ==
From 1980 to 1994, Birx served as an active duty reserve officer in the United States Army. From 1994 to 2008, Birx was active duty regular Army, achieving the rank of Colonel.

From 1980 to 1989, Birx worked as a physician at the Walter Reed Army Medical Center. In 1981, Birx completed a one-year internship and did a two-year residency in internal medicine. From 1983 to 1986, she completed two fellowships in clinical immunology in the areas of allergies and diagnostics, where she worked in Anthony Fauci's lab. From 1985 to 1989, Birx was the assistant chief of the Walter Reed Allergy/Immunology Service. Birx started her career as a clinician in immunology, eventually focusing on HIV/AIDS vaccine research.

From 1986 to 1989, Birx worked at the National Institutes of Health as an investigator specializing in cellular immunology.

Birx returned to Walter Reed, where from 1989 to 1995 she worked in the Department of Retroviral Research, first as an assistant chief and then as chief of the division. She was lab director in HIV-1 Vaccine Development for a year. Birx became the director of the United States Military HIV Research Program at the Walter Reed Army Institute of Research, a position she held for nine years, from 1996 to 2005. In that position, Birx led the HIV vaccine clinical trial of RV 144, the first supporting evidence of any vaccine being effective in lowering the risk of contracting HIV.

In March 2020, Birx became a board member of the Global Fund to Fight AIDS, Tuberculosis and Malaria.

=== CDC ===
From 2005 to 2014, Birx served as the director of Centers for Disease Control and Prevention's Division of Global HIV/AIDS (DGHA), part of the agency's Center for Global Health.

=== President's Emergency Plan for AIDS Relief ===
In January 2014, President Barack Obama nominated Birx to be the Ambassador-at-Large and U.S. Global AIDS Coordinator as part of the President's Emergency Plan for AIDS Relief (PEPFAR) program.

Birx was confirmed by the Senate by voice vote on April 2, 2014, and was sworn in two days later. She described her role as ambassador to help meet the HIV prevention and treatment targets set by Obama in 2015 to end the AIDS epidemic by 2030. Her role has focused on the areas of HIV/AIDS immunology, vaccine research, and global health issues around HIV/AIDS. As part of her work with HIV prevention, Birx created a program called DREAMS (Determined, Resilient, Empowered, AIDS-free, Mentored and Safe), a public-private partnership focused on reducing infection rates among adolescent girls and young women. PEPFAR management under Birx came under scrutiny in a February 2020 audit conducted by the State Department's Office of the Inspector General, with leadership of the program being described as "dictatorial", "directive" and "autocratic."

=== White House Coronavirus Task Force ===
On February 27, 2020, Vice President Mike Pence appointed Birx to the position of White House Coronavirus Response Coordinator. As part of this role, Birx reported to Pence on the White House Coronavirus Task Force. Pence called her his "right arm" on the task force. In televised briefings, Birx interpreted data on the virus, urged the public to practice social distancing, and tried to avoid publicly contradicting Trump, who frequently offered unscientific digressions.

On March 26, 2020, Birx sought to reassure Americans in a press conference that "there is no situation in the United States right now that warrants that kind of discussion [that ventilators or ICU hospital beds might be in limited supply] ... You can be thinking about it ... but to say that to the American people, to make the implication that when they need a hospital bed, it's not going to be there, or when they need that ventilator, it's not going to be there, we don't have evidence of that right now."

Birx led the creation of a reopening plan presented by Trump on April 16, 2020, with voluntary standards for states to end coronavirus lockdowns.

During the state reopenings, Birx warned individuals to continue precautions against the virus, and opposed some non-essential activities such as professional haircuts. "You need to continue to social distance," she said on May 3, 2020.

In July 2020, a working group convened by Birx ordered hospitals to bypass the Centers for Disease Control and Prevention and instead send all COVID-19 patient information to a database at the Department of Health and Human Services. Some health experts opposed the order and warned that the data might become politicized or withheld from the public. Birx, who had criticized hospitals and the CDC for being slow to gather data, helped select the data firm Palantir to help run HHS's new system. She later joined Palantir's federal advisory board in 2022.

On August 2, 2020, Birx recommended that people living with someone vulnerable to COVID-19 consider wearing masks at home. She said that the United States was in a "new phase" of the coronavirus epidemic that was "extraordinarily widespread".

On August 10, 2020, Scott Atlas joined the White House, becoming President Trump's top COVID-19 advisor. Afterward, Birx traveled to virus hot spots around the United States to work on mask mandates and social distancing guidelines with state and local officials. According to CNN, she told a friend that she aimed to take her message directly to the people and sidestep misleading messages disseminated by Atlas.

Birx visited Minnesota in August and October 2020. While in Minnesota, she told Andy Slavitt that she hopes "the election turns out a certain way."

In November 2020, an internal report from Birx stated in bold font: "There is an absolute necessity of the Administration to use this moment to ask the American people to wear masks, physical distance and avoid gatherings in both public and private spaces." The report also stated that confronting an emerging wave of the pandemic required "an aggressive and balanced approach that is not being implemented". In December 2020, she warned that "The vaccine is critical, but it's not going to save us from this current surge", and that multiple approaches would be needed to fight the virus.

Birx was alternately praised and pilloried by various sides, both for her responses as well as the actions in general of the CDC as well as the coronavirus task force. Critics alleged that Birx minimized the dangers of coronavirus and downplayed equipment shortfalls. She had been the White House's chief proponent for the idea in April that COVID-19 infections had peaked and the virus was fading quickly, when infections surged afterward. A board member at the American College of Emergency Physicians, Ryan A. Stanton, said Birx sounded like “the builders of the Titanic saying the ship can't sink". Birx was also accused of squandering her credibility and bringing her independence into question with her public praise of Trump, whom many believed bungled the coronavirus response.

In December 2020, Birx indicated that she would retire from government soon after Joe Biden assumed office, stating that she would "stay as long as needed and then retire" and that her tenure had "been a bit overwhelming" and was "very difficult on my family". Birx's announcement came after news broke that she hosted three generations of her own family from two households during Thanksgiving after she had urged Americans to restrict such gatherings to "your immediate household". On January 20, 2021, her term ended. Afterwards, Birx stated that she often considered quitting her position as White House coronavirus response coordinator under the Trump administration due to the administration's hyper-partisanship, especially during the 2020 presidential election. Birx also asserted that the Trump administration "censored" her "science-based guidance" and that she was also "being deliberately blocked" from appearing on national media outlets for a time.

In a July 2022 interview with Fox News, Birx said, "I think we overplayed the vaccines, and it made people then worry that it's not going to protect against severe disease and hospitalization. It will. But let's be very clear: 50% of the people who died from the Omicron surge were older, vaccinated. So that's why I'm saying even if you're vaccinated and boosted, if you're unvaccinated right now, the key is testing and Paxlovid. It's effective. It's a great antiviral. And really, that is what's going to save your lives right now if you're over 70, which if you look at the hospitalizations, hospitalizations are rising steadily with new admissions, particularly in those over 70."

=== George W. Bush Institute ===
In March 2021, Birx joined the George W. Bush Institute in Dallas, Texas, as a senior fellow, working on initiatives to reduce health disparities and prepare for future pandemics.

== Personal life ==
In 2020, Birx lived with her parents, husband, and the family of one of her daughters in a multi-generational home. Birx's husband, Paige Reffe, is a lawyer who held managerial roles in the Carter, Reagan, and Clinton administrations.

== Awards and honors ==
- 1989: United States Department of Defense, Legion of Merit
- 1991: United States Department of Defense, Meritorious Service Medal, recombinant gp160 vaccine
- 2008: Federal Executive Board, Outstanding Manager
- 2011: African Society for Laboratory Medicine, ASLM Lifetime Achievement Award
- 2014: Centers for Disease Control and Prevention, William C. Watson Jr. Medal of Excellence
- 2019: International Relations Council, Distinguished Service Award for International Statesmanship

== Selected works and publications ==
- Birx DL, Redfield RR, Tosato G (April 3, 1986). "Defective Regulation of Epstein–Barr Virus Infection in Patients with Acquired Immunodeficiency Syndrome (AIDS) or AIDS-Related Disorders". New England Journal of Medicine. 314 (14): 874–879. doi:10.1056/NEJM198604033141403. PMID 3005862. Wikidata ()
- Redfield RR, Birx DL, Ketter N, Tramont E, Polonis V, Davis C, Brundage JF, Smith G, Johnson S, Fowler A (June 13, 1991). "A Phase I Evaluation of the Safety and Immunogenicity of Vaccination with Recombinant gp160 in Patients with Early Human Immunodeficiency Virus Infection". New England Journal of Medicine. 324 (24): 1677–1684. doi:10.1056/NEJM199106133242401. PMID 1674589. Wikidata ()
- Wolfe ND, Heneine W, Carr JK, Garcia AD, Shanmugam V, Tamoufe U, Torimiro JN, Prosser AT, Lebreton M, Mpoudi-Ngole E, McCutchan FE, Birx DL, Folks TM, Burke DS, Switzer WM (May 23, 2005). "Emergence of unique primate T-lymphotropic viruses among central African bushmeat hunters". Proceedings of the National Academy of Sciences. 102 (22): 7994–7999. Bibcode:2005PNAS..102.7994W. doi:10.1073/pnas.0501734102. PMC 1142377. PMID 15911757. Wikidata ()
- Rerks-Ngarm, Supachai; Pitisuttithum, Punnee; Nitayaphan, Sorachai; Kaewkungwal, Jaranit; Chiu, Joseph; Paris, Robert; Premsri, Nakorn; Namwat, Chawetsan; de Souza, Mark; Adams, Elizabeth; Benenson, Michael; Gurunathan, Sanjay; Tartaglia, Jim; McNeil, John G.; Francis, Donald P.; Stablein, Donald; Birx, Deborah L.; Chunsuttiwat, Supamit; Khamboonruang, Chirasak; Thongcharoen, Prasert; Robb, Merlin L.; Michael, Nelson L.; Kunasol, Prayura; Kim, Jerome H. (December 3, 2009). "Vaccination with ALVAC and AIDSVAX to Prevent HIV-1 Infection in Thailand". New England Journal of Medicine. 361 (23): 2209–2220. doi:10.1056/NEJMoa0908492. PMID 19843557. Wikidata ()
- Abdool Karim Q, Baxter C, Birx D (May 2017). "Prevention of HIV in Adolescent Girls and Young Women". Journal of Acquired Immune Deficiency Syndromes. 75: S17–S26. doi:10.1097/QAI.0000000000001316. hdl:10413/15136. PMID 28398993. S2CID 42044853. Wikidata ()
- Raizes E, Hader S, Birx D (November 15, 2017). "The US President's Emergency Plan for AIDS Relief (PEPFAR) and HIV Drug Resistance: Mitigating Risk, Monitoring Impact". The Journal of Infectious Diseases. 216 (suppl_9): S805–S807. doi:10.1093/infdis/jix432. PMC 5853460. PMID 29206999.
- Nkengasong JN, Mbopi-Keou FX, Peeling RW, Yao K, Zeh CE, Schneidman M, Gadde R, Abimiku A, Onyebujoh P, Birx D, Hader S (November 2018). "Laboratory medicine in Africa since 2008: then, now, and the future". The Lancet Infectious Diseases. 18 (11): e362–e367. doi:10.1016/S1473-3099(18)30120-8. PMID 29980383. Wikidata ()
- Birx, Deborah. Silent Invasion: The Untold Story of the Trump Administration, Covid-19, and Preventing the Next Pandemic Before It's Too Late. United States, HarperCollins, 2022. ISBN 978-0063204232

== Notes ==
Diplomatic posts
Preceded by Eric Goosby	United States Global AIDS Coordinator; 2014–2021	Succeeded by Angeli Achrekar; Acting
New creation	White House Coronavirus Response Coordinator; 2020–2021	Succeeded by Jeffrey Zients
