= United States Global AIDS Coordinator =

United States diplomat fighting AIDS

- Seal of the United States Department of State

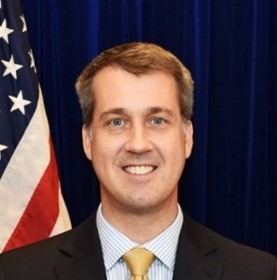
- Incumbent; Jeffrey Graham; Acting since January 21, 2025
- United States Department of State; President's Emergency Plan for AIDS Relief
- Reports to: Secretary of State
- Nominator: President of the United States
- Inaugural holder: Randall Tobias
- Formation: October 6, 2003
- Succession: Bureau of Global Health Security and Diplomacy
- Website: U.S. PEPFAR

The global AIDS coordinator at the United States Department of State is the official responsible for overseeing U.S.-sponsored humanitarian aid programs to combat the AIDS epidemic around the world. The global AIDS coordinator holds the rank of ambassador-at-large and assistant secretary.

== Mission ==
The mission of the Office of the U.S. Global AIDS Coordinator and Health Diplomacy (OGAC) is to lead the implementation of the U.S. President's Emergency Plan For AIDS Relief (PEPFAR), which represents the largest commitment ever by any nation for an international health initiative dedicated to a single disease. Initiated in 2003, PEPFAR has been reauthorized three times. What began as an emergency response has since developed into one of the largest international health initiatives. PEPFAR has supported countries in the development of national health and information systems to support the fight against HIV/AIDS and other diseases, and is collaborating with countries around the world to work towards epidemic control. PEPFAR aid has directly contributed to preventing over 20 million excess deaths in 50 countries around the world, as of June 2021.

OGAC is also one of the few offices at the State Department that reports directly to the secretary of state, instead of going through a deputy secretary of state.

The second Trump administration merged the position into the newly created Bureau of Global Health Security and Diplomacy.

== List of global AIDS coordinators ==
No.	Image	Name	Term
1		Randall Tobias	October 6, 2003 – March 31, 2006
–		Mark Dybul	March 31, to August 2006 (Acting)
2		Mark Dybul	August 2006 – January 20, 2009
3		Eric Goosby	June 23, 2009 – November 2013
4		Deborah Birx	April 4, 2014 – January 20, 2021
–		Angeli Achrekar (Acting)	January 20, 2021 – June 13, 2022
5		John Nkengasong	June 13, 2022 – January 20, 2025
–		Jeffrey Graham (Acting)	January 21, 2025 – Present
