= Evergreen (media) =

Journalism term referring to content that is not time-sensitive

Within the context of journalism and broadcasting, evergreen content is content that is not time-sensitive. Evergreen content does not rely on current events; thus, an evergreen story can be prepared, then mothballed until it is needed to fill time on a slower news day or on a holiday when fewer journalists are on duty. The term is derived from evergreen trees.

== Journalism ==
An evergreen news magazine has more flexibility in production, not having to be produced on a set time frame; instead of producing a new newscast every day or week, a show consisting of evergreen content can produce several episodes at once and release them in sequence. In contrast, such content is not as responsive to breaking developments. Feature stories and human interest stories are usually evergreen. The term is also used for long-lasting content in marketing materials and advertising.

== Television ==
Evergreen television shows are ideal for reruns. Seinfeld, for example, has been one of the most successful sitcoms in off-network syndication for over two decades, as its observational comedy did not rely on pop culture references that could become dated. Garry Marshall often set his shows in the near-past, such examples including Happy Days and its spinoff Laverne & Shirley, on the suggestion of one of his producers, Thomas L. Miller, who noted that shows that are somewhat old or retro to begin with and become popular hits do not lose their popularity or freshness as years pass. Both shows went on to have a long afterlife in syndication; That '70s Show, a Carsey-Werner sitcom, followed a similar concept and lasted several years in reruns. In contrast, Murphy Brown, a show of similar longevity and popularity from the same era as Seinfeld, was a syndication failure in part because of its frequent reliance upon current events of the 1990s.

A show's evergreen status can also be grounds for cancellation once it has built up a backlog of episodes which can be continually re-run. After The Jerry Springer Show was cancelled in 2018, television analyst Bill Carroll remarked, "Realistically, I don't think the audience is able to look at the show and say, 'that's one from this year, or two years ago or four years ago.' It has become so homogenous". Byron Allen regularly relies on keeping his shows evergreen to allow him to reduce the number of episodes he has to produce.
