= Randall L. Tobias =

American diplomat

Randy Tobias
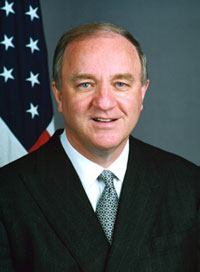

14th Administrator of the United States Agency for International Development
- In office March 31, 2006 – April 27, 2007
- President: George W. Bush
- Preceded by: Andrew Natsios
- Succeeded by: Henrietta H. Fore

1st United States Global AIDS Coordinator
- In office October 6, 2003 – March 31, 2006
- President: George W. Bush
- Preceded by: Position established
- Succeeded by: Mark Dybul

Personal details
- Born: March 20, 1942 (age 84) Remington, Indiana, U.S.
- Party: Republican
- Education: Indiana University, Bloomington (BS)

Randall L. Tobias (born March 20, 1942) is an American governmental figure and former chief executive officer of Eli Lilly and Company. A Republican, he was appointed the first United States Director of Foreign Assistance and concurrently served as the administrator of the U.S. Agency for International Development (USAID) with the rank of ambassador. He resigned on April 27, 2007, after being linked to the D.C. Madam scandal of Deborah Jeane Palfrey.

== Public sector career ==
President George W. Bush nominated Tobias, then CEO of Eli Lilly, to be the first United States Global AIDS Coordinator on July 2, 2003. Bush chose Tobias to appease pharmaceutical companies that viewed the President's Emergency Plan for AIDS Relief (PEPFAR)'s distribution of generic medications as patent infringement. He was confirmed by the Senate on October 3, 2003, and sworn in on October 6. Tobias' decision to require Food and Drug Administration approval of generic medications before their use in PEPFAR activities was criticized as unnecessary, as the manufacturers already received approval from the World Health Organization. Under pressure from Congress, Tobias compromised by accelerating FDA approval of PEPFAR drugs.

In 2006, Tobias became the first United States Director of Foreign Assistance and concurrently served as the Administrator of the United States Agency for International Development (USAID). Tobias was confirmed by the Senate on March 29, 2006, and was sworn in on March 31.

In these positions, Tobias was responsible for overseeing all foreign assistance activities of the American government. In addition to his direct responsibilities for USAID, Tobias was charged with directing the transformation of the American approach to foreign assistance. As Director of Foreign Assistance, Tobias was responsible for providing strategic direction and guidance to all other foreign assistance programs delivered through the various agencies and entities of the U.S. Government, including the Millennium Challenge Corporation and the Office of the U.S. Global AIDS Coordinator. He reported directly to Secretary of State Condoleezza Rice and held the rank of Deputy Secretary of State.

Tobias resigned in disgrace on April 27, 2007, after being linked to the D.C. Madam scandal of Deborah Jeane Palfrey. He was a member of the board of directors of the Overseas Private Investment Corporation. This corporation was dissolved in 2019.

== Private sector career ==
Tobias previously served as AT&T's vice chairman from 1986 until 1993, and as chairman and CEO of AT&T International from 1991 until 1993. In 1993, he left AT&T to become chairman, president and CEO of Eli Lilly and Company, bringing about a sharp rebound in profits and stock price, and introducing new products such as Zyprexa. Tobias served in that position until 1999.

Tobias also has served on a number of corporate boards, including AT&T, Eli Lilly and Company, Chemical Bank of New York, Agilent Technologies, Kimberly-Clark, Knight Ridder and ConocoPhillips Petroleum Company. He also served for 12 years as a trustee of the Colonial Williamsburg Foundation, and for 13 years as a trustee of Duke University, including 3 years as chair of the board.

Tobias received the "Positive Ally Award" from the National Association of People with AIDS in 2005. He also authored the book, Put The Moose On The Table, which was published in 2003.

== Scandal ==
On April 26, 2007, Tobias was questioned by Federal investigators, regarding any services he received from the escort service owned by Deborah Jeane Palfrey, who has been charged with prostitution-related racketeering. When reached by ABC News on April 26, Tobias said he had several times called the "Pamela Martin and Associates" escort service "to have gals come over to the condo to give me a massage." Tobias, who is married, said there had been "no sex," and that recently he had been using another service "with Central Americans" to provide his "massages."

The next day, April 27, 2007, Tobias resigned from his U. S. State Department position as Director of US Foreign Assistance and as Administrator of the United States Agency for International Development (USAID). A State Department press release said only he was leaving for "personal reasons."

=== Denouncements of prostitution ===
As President Bush's AIDS Coordinator, Tobias was responsible for setting policy detailing which countries would receive monies from various US agencies, how much, and what the rules governing assignment of those funds would be. As AIDS Coordinator, he discussed the rules in an interview with PBS' Frontline where he detailed a legal requirement that recipients of U.S. aid denounce prostitution:

The Congress I think very appropriately has put into the legislation that created this program that organizations, in order to receive money, need to have a policy opposed to prostitution and sex trafficking. I don't think it's too difficult for people to be opposed to prostitution and sex trafficking, which are in fact two contributing causes to the spread of HIV/AIDS. I think when organizations initially became aware of that requirement, some organizations were concerned about what the implications of that might be, but we implemented that in the first year with non-U.S. organizations. We're now implementing that requirement with U.S. organizations. And so far, I really know of no problems that we've had on the ground.

"I think it is somewhat ironic and hypocritical that he would patronize an escort service while he was denying funding to organizations who want to help prostitutes, and supporting a policy that obviously forbids fraternizing with prostitutes," said Jodi Jacobson, executive director for the Center for Health and Gender Equity, Washington, D.C. The Bush administration's policy, said Jacobson and others, has led to the closure of numerous programs that had been teaching job skills to sex workers, forcing many prostitutes out of brothels and into the street.

=== Advocacy of abstinence over condom usage and 'safe sex' ===
In his capacity as Director of Foreign Assistance, Tobias encouraged sexual abstinence, and discounted the use of condoms, in preventing HIV/AIDS. "Statistics show that condoms really have not been very effective," Tobias told a news conference in Berlin on April 21, 2004.

Later, in March 2005, Tobias told PBS' Frontline:

Well, the heart of our prevention programs is what's known as ABC: Abstinence, Be faithful, and the correct and consistent use of Condoms, when appropriate. And it's not "ABC: Take your pick." It's abstinence really focused heavily on young people and getting them to understand that the best way to keep from getting infected is to be abstinent and not engage in sexual activity until they are old enough and mature enough and get into a committed relationship, such as a marriage. B is being faithful within that committed relationship. And A and B, those two things together clearly had a huge impact in bringing the infection rates down in Uganda.

C recognizes the fact that there are individuals in high-risk circumstances who either by choice or by coercion are going to find themselves unable to follow A and B, and therefore they need to have access to condoms, and they need to understand the correct and consistent use of condoms. I think more and more of the experts, the people who really understand the prevention requirements with HIV/AIDS, have come to endorse ABC in a very balanced way as the appropriate prevention centerpiece.

But I would also add that as important as ABC is, the fact is that this is a disease where 50 percent of the people infected in the world are women. When I cite those numbers to people here in the United States, I find most people are astonished. They just have no idea about that. In some countries in Africa, it's well above 50 percent that are women and girls. In many cases this is driven by cultural factors, where young girls are having sex with older men and [are] coerced to do that, where women aren't regarded as equal citizens with men. So there are lots of things that need to be done addressing those kinds of cultural issues also.

== See also ==
- List of U.S. executive branch 'czars'
- List of federal political sex scandals in the United States

Diplomatic posts
New office	United States Global AIDS Coordinator; 2003–2006	Succeeded by Mark Dybul
Political offices
Preceded by Andrew Natsios	Administrator of the United States Agency for International Development; 2006–2007	Succeeded by Henrietta H. Fore
