= Eric Goosby =

American public health official

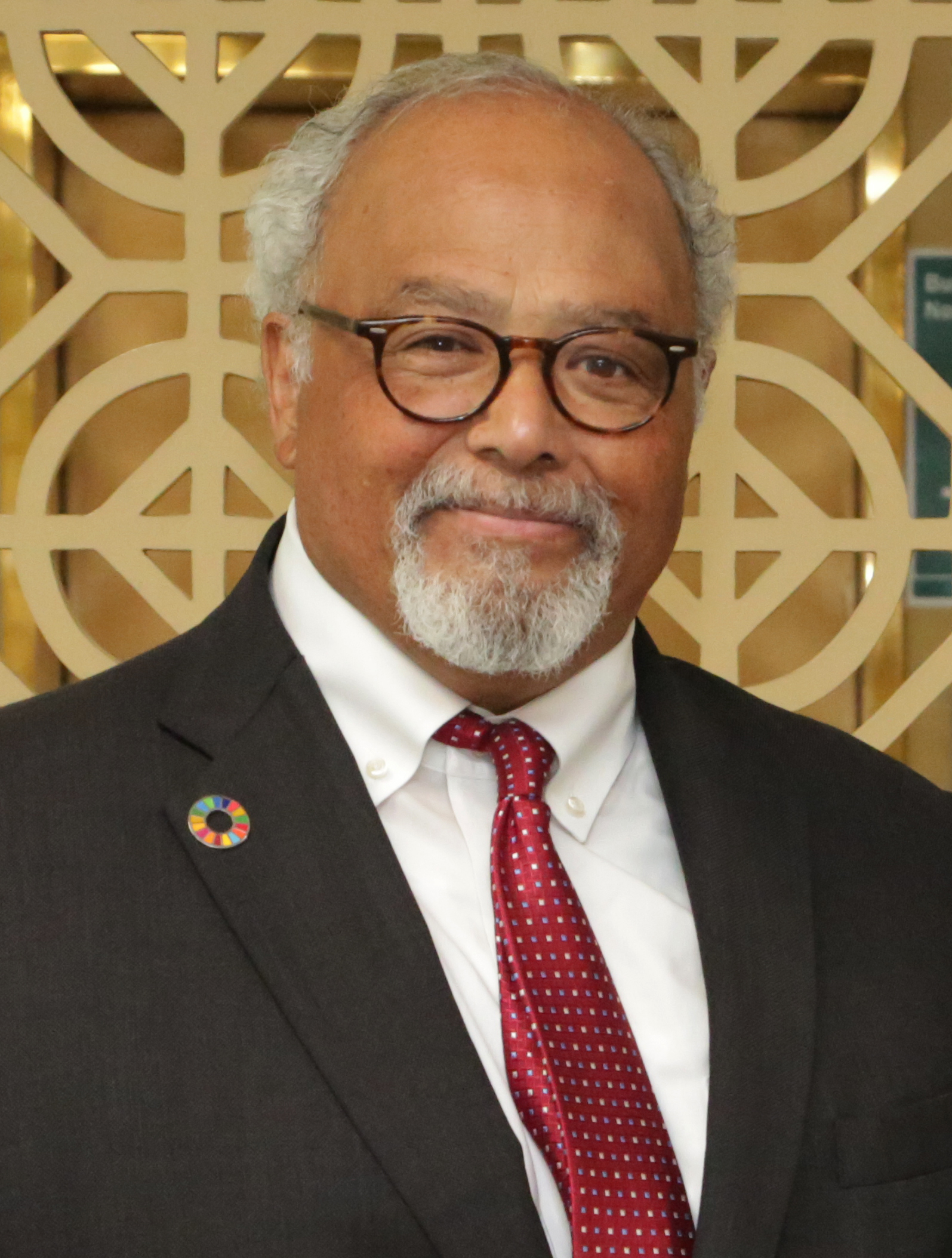

3rd United States Global AIDS Coordinator
- In office June 2009 – November 2013
- Preceded by: Mark R. Dybul
- Succeeded by: Deborah Birx

Personal details
- Born: 1952 (age 73–74) San Francisco, California, U.S.
- Education: Princeton University (BA); University of California, San Francisco (MD)

Eric Goosby (born 1952) is an American public health official, currently serving as Professor of Medicine and Director of the Center for Global Health Delivery, Diplomacy and Economics, Institute for Global Health Sciences at University of California, San Francisco. Dr. Goosby previously served as the UN Special Envoy on Tuberculosis as well as previously served as the United States Global AIDS Coordinator from 2009 until mid-November 2013. In the role, Goosby directed the U.S. strategy for addressing HIV around the world and led President Obama's implementation of the President's Emergency Plan for AIDS Relief (PEPFAR). Goosby was sworn in during June 2009 and resigned in November 2013, taking a position as a professor at UCSF, where he directs the Center for Global Health Delivery and Diplomacy, a collaboration between UCSF and the University of California, Berkeley.

On November 9, 2020, he was named a member of President-elect Joe Biden's COVID-19 Advisory Board.

== Early life and education ==
Goosby was born and raised in San Francisco, the son of Dr. Zuretti Goosby, a dentist and politician who served on the San Francisco Board of Education. Goosby earned a Bachelor of Arts degree in Biology from Princeton University. Goosby received his MD in 1978 from the University of California, San Francisco, where he also completed his residency in 1981. Goosby then completed a two-year Kaiser Fellowship at UCSF in General Internal Medicine with a subspecialty in Infectious Diseases.

== Career ==
Goosby has over 35 years experience working in the field of HIV/AIDS. Goosby treated patients at San Francisco General Hospital when HIV/AIDS first began to emerge and take its toll in the early 1980s. In 1986, he served as the AIDS activity division attending physician, and in 1987 was appointed associate medical director of San Francisco General Hospital's AIDS Clinic. During his time at San Francisco General, he helped develop effective models for HIV/AIDS clinical care for intravenous drug users, establishing three medical facilities located in methadone treatment centers.

=== Government service ===
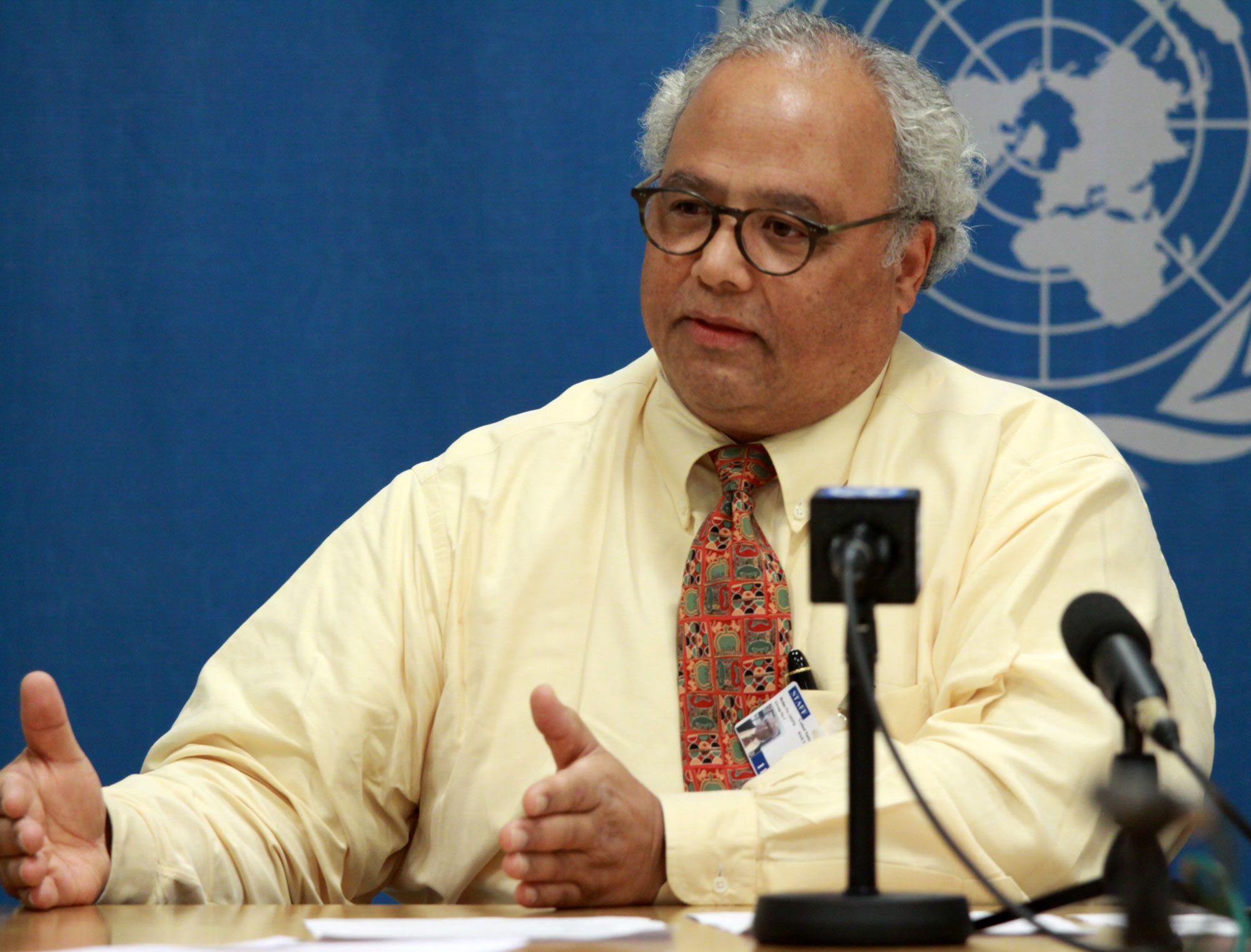
Goosby at a Press Conference at the United Nations Office in Geneva, December 11, 2009

In 1991, Goosby began his government career as director of HIV Services at the Health Resources and Services Administration, in the United States Department of Health and Human Services. In this position, he administered the newly-authorized Ryan White CARE Act, overseeing the distribution of federal funds and the planning of services in 25 AIDS epicenters, as well as in all 50 states and U.S. territories. In 1994, Goosby became director of the Office of HIV/AIDS Policy in the United States Department of Health and Human Services, where he advised on the federal HIV/AIDS budget and worked with Congress on all AIDS-related issues.

In 1995, Goosby created and convened the DHHS Panel on Clinical Practices for the Treatment of HIV Infections. This panel defined how to use protease inhibitors in conjunction with already existing antiretrovirals, later expanding its work to address standards of care for antiretroviral use for pediatric patients and pregnant women. Goosby has remained actively involved in this panel, now known the DHHS Panel on Antiretroviral Guidelines for Adults and Adolescents, which is widely recognized as defining the standard of care for HIV/AIDS treatment in the United States.

In 1997, Goosby also served as interim director of the Office of National AIDS Policy at the White House, reporting directly to the President as his senior advisor on HIV-related issues. Goosby's office was responsible for guiding the implementation of this initiative at HHS over the next three years. Goosby's office also coordinated scientific reviews of needle exchange as a public health intervention. In 2000, Goosby served as acting deputy director of the National AIDS Policy Office in the White House, while continuing to work as director of HIV/AIDS policy at the Department of Health and Human Services.

=== International work ===
After leaving government service, Goosby was CEO and Chief Medical Officer of Pangaea Global AIDS Foundation from 2001 to 2009. He was also a Professor of Clinical Medicine at the University of California, San Francisco and a clinical provider for the 360 Men of Color Program.

While with Pangaea, Goosby played a key role in the development and/or implementation of HIV/AIDS national treatment scale-up plans in Rwanda, South Africa, China, and Ukraine. During this time, Goosby developed extensive international experience in the development of treatment guidelines for use of antiretroviral therapies, clinical mentoring and training of health professionals, and the design and implementation of local models of care for HIV/AIDS, focusing his expertise on the scale-up of sustainable HIV/AIDS treatment capacity, including the delivery of HIV antiretroviral drugs, within existing healthcare systems.

On January 20, 2015, United Nations Secretary-General Ban Ki-moon appointed Goosby as his new Special Envoy on Tuberculosis. In this capacity, Goosby will work towards boosting the profile of the fight against TB and promoting the adoption, financing and implementation of the World Health Organization’s global End TB Strategy after 2015.

Goosby has served on the board of directors of the Clinton Foundation since 2013.

=== PEPFAR ===
On June 23, 2009, Goosby was sworn in as the United States Global AIDS Coordinator, heading up the President's Emergency Plan for AIDS Relief (PEPFAR). At the time of his swearing in, Goosby stated that his top priorities included:

- intensifying the focus on HIV prevention
- pursuing strong country partnerships
- ensuring that HIV/AIDS initiatives are country owned and coordinated
- furthering the coordination of multilateral engagement
- strengthening health systems through programs and country-driven planning
- taking effective interventions to scale to achieve population-level health outcomes

As of September 2023, PEPFAR supported antiretroviral treatment for nearly 20.5 million people worldwide. Of the number of PEPFAR covered clients, 96% of adults and 88% of children were virologically suppressed suggest quality of program.
