= Mark R. Dybul =

American diplomat

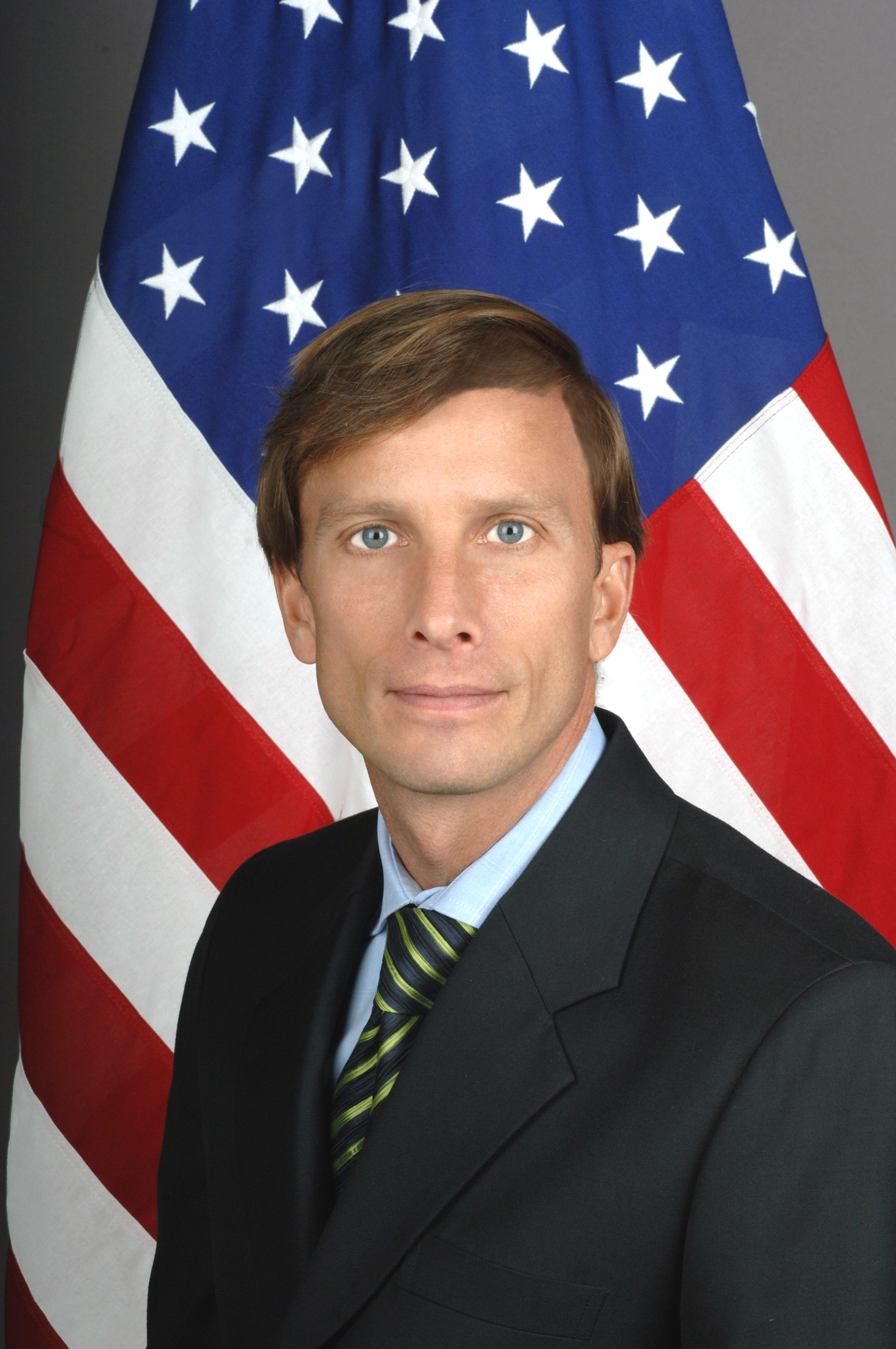
- Dybul in 2006

2nd United States Global AIDS Coordinator
- In office August 2006 – January 2009; Acting: March to August 2006
- President: George W. Bush
- Preceded by: Randall L. Tobias
- Succeeded by: Eric Goosby

Personal details
- Born: Mark Richard Dybul; 1963 (age 62–63)
- Citizenship: United States
- Education: Georgetown University
- Occupation: Diplomat, Physician

Mark R. Dybul (born September 23, 1963) is an American diplomat, physician and medical researcher. He served as the executive director of the Global Fund to Fight AIDS, Tuberculosis and Malaria from 2012 until 2017. From 2021 to Oct 2024, he was the CEO of Renovaro Biosciences. Since 2022, he is the Board Chairperson of Purpose Africa. He is also a Georgetown University professor in the Department of Medicine at the Medical Center and a senior advisor at the Center for Global Health Practice and Impact. He is a member of the Global Health Initiative faculty committee. On October 28, 2026, Dybul was elected to a 4-year term as executive director of the Global Fund to Fight AIDS, Tuberculosis, and Malaria. He will return to the Fund in early 2027.

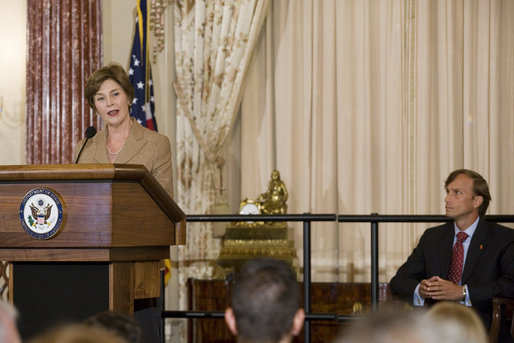
Dybul with Laura Bush during his swearing-in on October 10, 2006

== Early life and education ==
Mark Dybul was born September 23, 1963. He received his A.B. (1985) and M.D. (1992) from Georgetown University and completed his residency in internal medicine at the University of Chicago Hospitals (1995) and a fellowship in infectious diseases under Tony Fauci at the National Institute of Allergy and Infectious Diseases (1998).

== Career ==
Dybul started his career by working with AIDS patients in San Francisco, California. Under the presidency of George W. Bush, he was appointed as the United States Global AIDS Coordinator, leading the implementation of the President's Emergency Plan for AIDS Relief from 2006 to 2009. However, he is a registered Independent. He is the first out gay ambassador with the rank of Assistant Secretary of State. Dybul was asked to stay on temporarily during the Barack Obama presidency transition, but was required to resign following the administration change, as he was a political appointee of the Bush administration.

On November 15, 2012, Dybul was appointed executive director of the Global Fund to Fight AIDS, Tuberculosis and Malaria. World Bank President Jim Yong Kim called Dybul's appointment a "superb choice for a crucial role". In an interview published in the Global Fund's digital newsletter, Dybul said his role as the Global Fund's new head "will be to maintain the strong forward trajectory of the Fund in order to end the three diseases". He assumed his role of head of the Global Fund in February 2013 and stepped down in May 2017. He said that during his time leading the fund, it had repositioned itself from "another big development agency" to a "coordinating mechanism."

In January 2019, Dybul became Executive Vice Chair of the Board of Enochian BioSciences, a biopharmaceutical company focused on gene-modified cellular and immune therapies. In July 2021, he was appointed the company's CEO. In August 2023, the company changed its name to Renovaro Biosciences and announced its intention to acquire Dutch Company GEDI Cube, as it distanced itself from co-founder Serhat Gumrukcu, who had been arrested on charges of murder-for-hire and sued by the company for falsifying drug study data. Dybul told shareholders these were "significant challenges that would have derailed many companies", but that the merger provided "a tremendous opportunity ... to capture a substantial share of a largely untapped market." Dybul resigned from his role and the board in October 2024.

Dybul is a professor in the department of medicine at the Medical Center of Georgetown University and the codirector of the Center for Global Health Practice and Impact. He is a member of the Global Health Initiative faculty committee. From 2020 until 2022, Dybul served as a member of the Independent Panel for Pandemic Preparedness and Response, a group examining how the World Health Organization and countries handled the COVID-19 pandemic, co-chaired by Helen Clark and Ellen Johnson Sirleaf. In the preparations for the Global Health Summit hosted by the European Commission and the G20 in May 2021, he was a member of the event's High Level Scientific Panel. Since 2022, he is the Board Chairperson of Purpose Africa.

In March 2026, Redwood AI announced they had appointed Dybul as the company's Public Safety and Defense Advisor.

On October 28, 2026, Dybul was elected to a 4-year term as executive director of the Global Fund to Fight AIDS, Tuberculosis, and Malaria at the Fund's 56th Board Meeting. He will rejoin the Fund in early 2027.

Dybul serves on the boards of the Clinton Health Access Initiative, Big Win Philanthropy, Management Services for Health, Accordia Global Health Foundation, and the board of advisors for Global Health Corps.

== Personal life ==
Dybul is married to Jason Claire.
