= Deborah Jeane Palfrey =

American escort agency operator (1956–2008)

- Born: March 18, 1956; North Charleroi, Pennsylvania, U.S.
- Died: May 1, 2008 (aged 52); Tarpon Springs, Florida, U.S.
- Cause of death: Suicide by hanging
- Other name: D. C. Madam
- Education: Rollins College

Deborah Jeane Palfrey (March 18, 1956 – May 1, 2008), dubbed the D. C. Madam by the news media, operated Pamela Martin and Associates, an escort agency in Washington, D.C. Although she maintained that the company's services were legal, she was convicted on April 15, 2008, of racketeering, using the mail for illegal purposes, and money laundering. Slightly over two weeks later, facing a prison sentence of five or six years, she was found hanged. Autopsy results and the final police investigative report concluded that her death was a suicide.

== Early life ==
Palfrey was born in Charleroi, Pennsylvania, a suburb of Pittsburgh, on March 18, 1956. She spent her teens in Orlando, Florida. Her father was a grocer. She graduated from Rollins College with a degree in criminal justice, and completed a nine-month legal course at the Thomas Jefferson School of Law.

== Career ==
Working as a paralegal in San Diego, she became involved in the escort business. Dismayed at how most services were run, including widespread drug abuse, she started her own company, recruiting mostly women over 25. In 1990, she was arrested on charges of pimping, pandering, and extortion. She fled to Montana, where she was captured while trying to cross the Canada–US border and brought back for trial.

Following her conviction in 1992, she spent 18 months in prison. After her release, she founded Pamela Martin and Associates.

=== D.C. Madam scandal ===
In June 2004, the United States Postal Inspection Service and Internal Revenue Service began an investigation into an illegal prostitution business being run in Washington, D.C. During the course of the investigation, Palfrey was identified as the operator of the prostitution ring. In October 2006, agents with the United States Postal Inspection Service posed as a couple who were interested in buying Palfrey's home as a means of accessing her property without a warrant. Agents subsequently froze bank accounts worth over US$500,000, and seized papers relating to money laundering and prostitution charges.

As her case proceeded, it was revealed that Palfrey's escorts charged as much as $300 per hour, and many have had professional careers. Palfrey continued to reside in California, and cleared some US $2 million over 13 years in operation. Palfrey appeared on ABC's 20/20 as part of an investigative report on May 4, 2007.

In response to Palfrey's statement that she had 10,000 to 15,000 phone numbers of clients, several clients' lawyers contacted Palfrey to see whether accommodations could be made to keep their identities private. Ultimately, ABC News, after going through what was described as 46 pounds (21 kg) of phone records, decided that none of the potential clients were sufficiently "newsworthy" to bother mentioning.

On July 9, 2007, Senator David Vitter (R-LA) acknowledged that he had been a customer of her escort service.

Thirteen former escorts and three former clients testified at her trial.

However, ABC News only published two of the names they had identified, men who were already known to have been clients of Palfrey—Randall L. Tobias, a State Department official, and Harlan K. Ullman, a Defense Department official. Journalist Neil A. Lewis reported, in The New York Times, that ABC would not publicize any new names.

The witnesses were compelled to testify, after being granted immunity from prosecution. In May 2007 a team at ABC News reported on their efforts to determine the identities of Palfrey's clients from her phone records. They reported how many of Palfrey's clients phoned from hotel rooms to obfuscate their identities. They found some clients had exaggerated their importance—one who had bragged about his role in evacuating colleagues from the White House on 9/11 turned out to merely work near The White House.

On April 15, 2008, a jury found Palfrey guilty of money laundering, using the mail for illegal purposes, and racketeering. Palfrey believed that contrary to the U.S. Attorney's Office lower estimate, she might spend six or seven years behind bars. She faced a maximum of 55 years in prison.

== Death ==
On May 1, 2008, roughly two weeks following her April 15 conviction, Palfrey was found hanging in a storage shed outside her mother's mobile home in Tarpon Springs, Florida. Police found handwritten suicide notes in the bedroom where she was staying, dated a week before her death. The autopsy and the final police investigation concluded her death was a suicide.

Palfrey's death resulted in her conviction being vacated.

=== Suicide notes ===
Palfrey's two handwritten notes were released to the public. In one of them, she wrote to her sister, "You must comprehend there was no way out, I.E. 'exit strategy,' for me other than the one I have chosen here." In another, she described her predicament as a "modern-day lynching". She said she feared that, at the end of serving her sentence, she would be "in my late 50s a broken, penniless and very much alone woman".

=== Speculation surrounding her death ===
The New York Times' Patrick J. Lyons wrote on the Times' blog, The Lede, that some on the Internet were skeptical that her death was a suicide. After investigating the crime scene, however, police found "no new evidence [that] would indicate anything other than suicide by hanging," and a police investigative report released six months later concluded that her death had been a suicide. The police stated that Palfrey's family believed the notes were written by Palfrey.

In early 2007, Palfrey learned of the death, apparently through suicide by hanging, of Brandi Britton, one of her former escort service employees. Palfrey reacted to this news by saying, "I guess I'm made of something that Brandy Britton wasn't made of." According to her former attorney, Montgomery Blair Sibley, she even took the extraordinary step of writing directly to the prosecutor, promising to show more resolve than Britton.

Journalist Dan Moldea, who was working with Palfrey on a book, recalled that in a 2007 conversation, Palfrey told him, "I am not going back to prison. I will commit suicide first." He said her previous prison experience had traumatized her and she felt she couldn't do it again.

== Palfrey's customer list ==
On July 9, 2007, Palfrey released the supposed entirety of her phone records for public viewing and downloading on the Internet in TIFF format though days prior to this her civil attorney, Montgomery Blair Sibley, had dispatched 54 CD-ROM copies to researchers, activists, and journalists.

=== 2016 Presidential Election ===
Montgomery Blair Sibley, Palfrey's former attorney, claimed her phone records were relevant to the 2016 presidential election. In April 2016, the U.S. Supreme Court denied the request to lift a lower court order, made by then-DC Chief Judge of the United States Court of Appeals for the District of Columbia Circuit on Merrick Garland, in place since 2007, that bars Sibley from releasing any information about her records.

== See also ==
- List of people who died by suicide by hanging
