= Eileen McGann (author) =

American lawyer, columnist, and author

- Occupation: Lawyer
- Political party: Republican
- Spouse: Dick Morris

Eileen McGann is an American lawyer, columnist, and author. Married to political consultant and commentator Dick Morris, McGann is frequently credited as a co-writer in Morris' literary output.

McGann and Morris were depicted on the September 9, 1996, cover of Time magazine.

McGann is Catholic and her husband is of Jewish descent; he later converted to Catholicism.

== Selected works ==
- Because He Could (2004, with Dick Morris) ISBN 0-06-078415-6
- Condi vs. Hillary: The Next Great Presidential Race (2005, with Dick Morris) ISBN 0-06-083913-9
- Outrage: How Illegal Immigration, the United Nations, Congressional Ripoffs, Student Loan Overcharges, Tobacco Companies, Trade Protection, and Drug Companies are Ripping Us Off . . . And What to Do About It (2007, with Dick Morris) ISBN 978-0061195402
- Catastrophe: How Obama, Congress, and the Special Interests Are Transforming a Slump Into a Crash, Freedom Into Socialism, and a Disaster Into a Catastrophe . . . and How to Fight Back (2008, with Dick Morris) ISBN 978-0061771040
- Fleeced: How Barack Obama, Media Mockery of Terrorist Threats, Liberals Who Want To Kill Talk Radio, the Do-Nothing Congress, Companies That Help Iran, and Washington Lobbyists for Foreign Governments Are Scamming Us...And What To Do About It (2008, with Dick Morris) ISBN 978-0-06-171866-3
- Revolt! How to Defeat Obama and Repeal His Socialist Programs (2011, with Dick Morris) ISBN 978-0062073303
- Screwed: How Foreign Countries Are Ripping America Off and Plundering Our Economy-and How Our Leaders Help Them Do It (2012, with Dick Morris) ISBN 978-0062196699
- Here Come the Black Helicopters!: UN Global Governance and the Loss of Freedom (2012, with Dick Morris) ISBN 978-0062240590
- Armageddon: How Trump Can Beat Hillary (2016, with Dick Morris) ISBN 978-1630060589
- Rogue Spooks: The Intelligence War on Donald Trump (2017, with Dick Morris) ISBN 9781250167866
