= Bureau of Global Health Security and Diplomacy =

Bureau within the United States Department of State

- Seal of the United States Department of State

Bureau overview
- Formed: August 1, 2023
- Preceding bureau: United States Global AIDS Coordinator
- Jurisdiction: Executive branch of the United States
- Bureau executive: Jeffrey Graham, Acting Assistant Secretary of State for Global Health Security and Diplomacy
- Parent department: U.S. Department of State
- Website: Official Website

The Bureau of Global Health Security and Diplomacy (GHSD) is a bureau within the United States Department of State. The bureau is under the purview of the under secretary of state for foreign assistance, humanitarian affairs and religious freedom. It was created on August 1, 2023.

== Assistant Secretary of State for Global Health Security and Diplomacy ==
The assistant secretary of state for global health security and diplomacy is the head of the bureau. They report to the secretary of state and the under secretary of state for foreign assistance, humanitarian affairs and religious freedom. The position was established on January 21, 2025, with the senior bureau official also serving as the acting U.S. global AIDS coordinator.

=== Officeholders ===
#	Name	Assumed office	Left office	President served under
-	Jeffrey Graham (acting)	January 21, 2025	Incumbent	Donald Trump
