= Lillian Gonzalez-Pardo =

Filipino American physician

Lillian Gonzalez-Pardo (February 5, 1939 – ) is a Filipino American physician. She is the first Asian American to serve as president of the American Medical Women's Association.

== Early life and education ==
Gonzalez-Pardo was born in Manila on February 5, 1939. She graduated from the University of the Philippines with a medical degree in 1962. She did an internship at the Philippines General Hospital. She was a neurology resident at the University of Kansas Medical Center from 1963 to 1967. She later switched her focus to child psychiatry. In 1967 Gonzalez-Pardo became a fellow at the Children's Mercy Hospital. While living in Kansas she met and married Manuel Pardo, another physician.

== Career ==
In 1969 Gonzalez-Pardo returned to the Philippines to teach medicine. However, she returned to the University of Kansas Medical Center in 1972 and served as a fellow in developmental pediatrics and then in 1974 became a resident in pediatrics. She became an assistant professor at the university in 1975. She became a full professor in 1992.

In 1992 Gonzalez-Pardo became the president of the American Medical Women's Association. She was the first Asian American to hold that position and was the immediate successor of Roselyn Payne Epps, the first African American to hold that position. During her tenure as president Gonzalez-Pardo pushed the organization to be more politically active both domestically and internationally.

Gonzalez-Pardo retired in 2006. Since her retirement she has conducted medical missions in the Philippines and done other volunteer and community work. In 2016 she published her autobiography entitled Beyond the Shores.

== Other activities ==
In 1972 she co-founded a Filipino dance troupe, Sinag-Tala, still in existence after over 50 years.

In 2017, she and her husband Manuel Pardo endowed an annual lecture on pediatric neurology by a visiting professor at the University of Kansas Medical Center, which has been named in her honor.

== Personal life ==
She and her husband have three grown children: Manuel Carlos, a physician, Lillian Elizabeth, a teacher, and Patrick, a writer, and five grandchildren.
