= Aerus =

Manufacturer of water treatment systems

Aerus LLC
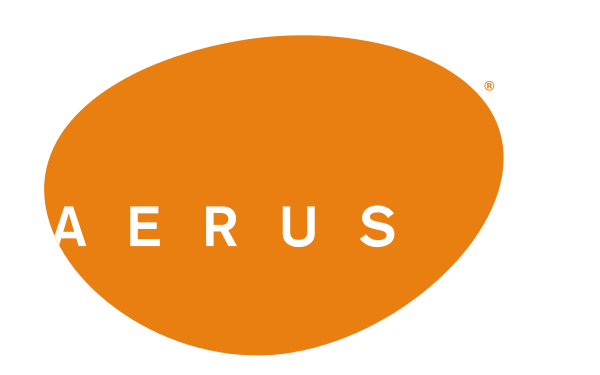
- Industry: Air and surface purification, water filtration and treatment, floor care
- Founded: 1924; 102 years ago (as Electrolux Corp USA)
- Headquarters: Bristol, Virginia, United States
- Products: Healthy Home Technologies
- Owner: Joseph P. Urso (CEO)
- Parent: AP Sciences Group, LLC
- Website: www.aerusvacuums.com

Aerus LLC, formerly Electrolux Corp. USA, manufactures air and surface purifiers, water filtration and treatment systems, and vacuum cleaners. It is headquartered in Bristol, Virginia, and has over 500 independently owned franchises in the U.S. and Canada. Aerus is the successor to Electrolux USA, the iconic manufacturer of vacuum cleaners. However, the Electrolux name is now used in the U.S. by the Electrolux Group of Sweden, which until 2016 also manufactured Eureka vacuum cleaners.

Electrolux Corporation USA was founded in 1924 by Gustaf Sahlin, a Swedish businessman who emigrated to the United States. Its tank vacuum quickly became an industry standard, and was very popular for many decades.

In 1968, Consolidated Foods Corporation (now known as Sara Lee Corporation) acquired Electrolux.

In 1989, Electrolux Corp. USA created Purelux, the first residential under-the-sink water purification system combining ultraviolet (UV) light and activated carbon filtration. Actor Lloyd Bridges was the company's spokesperson.

In 2000, the North American rights to the Electrolux brand name were sold to Electrolux Group of Sweden, which since 1968 had been unaffiliated. The corporation that originally manufactured Electrolux vacuums has been known as Aerus since 2001.

== Company history ==
Aerus LLC was formed in 1924 as Electrolux Corporation USA.

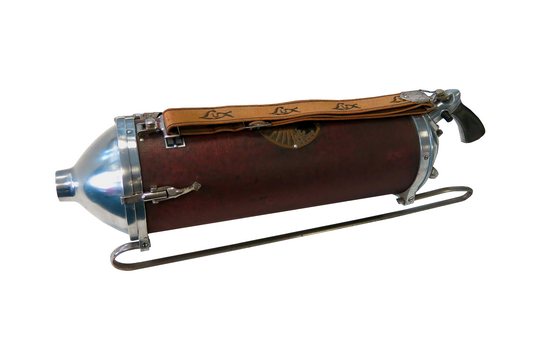
Electrolux Model V, first vacuum sold by Electrolux Corp USA 1924-1928

In 1924, Gustaf Sahlin came to America to set up Electrolux Corp USA to import and sell the new tank type vacuum cleaner in America. The machine was the revolutionary Lux Model V made by AB Electro-Lux of Sweden and invented by Axel Wenner-Gren. People did not know what the new contraption was at first, but when showed how well it cleaned in their home, they were sold. In 1929, a shipment of Model XI cleaners sank, forcing Electrolux Corp. to build machines in the US. In 1931, the White Sewing Machine Company in Cleveland, OH was contracted to build the Model XII, however this was not a permanent move as Electrolux Corp. wanted its own factory. In 1933, Electrolux Corp. set up a new factory in Old Greenwich, Connecticut. With Electrolux Corp. in good shape and making its own products, AB Electrolux divested its stock to focus on refrigerator production and made itself a minority shareholder. From then on the two companies sold different products. The American products were never sold in Europe and the European products were never sold in America.

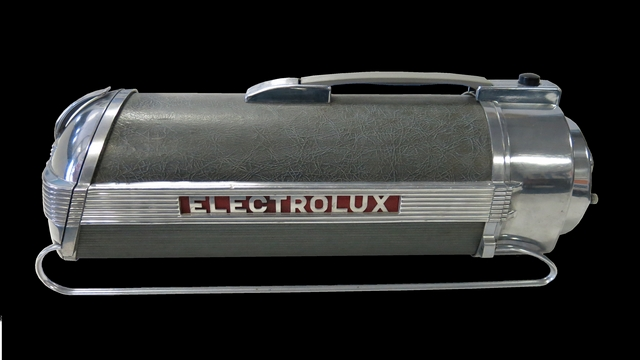
The immensely popular Electrolux Model XXX. There were several variations of the Model XXX in its 17-year run, this machine is a 1937.

In 1937, the now American-owned Electrolux Corp. debuted the Electrolux Model XXX (Model 30). It was the first American-only Electrolux. The Model XXX was sold from 1937 to 1954, making it the longest-made vacuum and in that time span over 14 million were sold. A Model XXX is currently on display at the Smithsonian and it is considered one of the top hundred U.S. inventions of all time. During World War II, Electrolux Corp halted vacuum production to focus on the war effort. The company made electric motors and control systems for the Army and Navy.

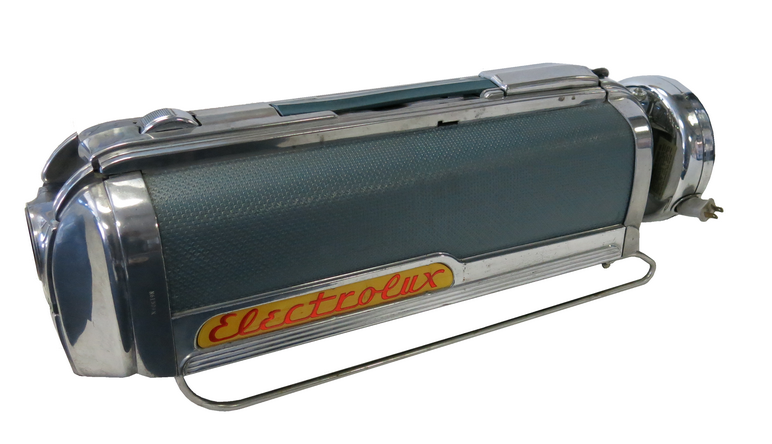
Electrolux Model LX - First vacuum to use a sealed disposable bag

In 1952, the company debuted the Electrolux Model LX, the first vacuum that would know when it is full and also the first vacuum to use a self-sealing bag. That same style bag is still in use on some of the new Aerus-Lux model canister vacuums today. This machine would lay the foundation for every other North American Electrolux vacuum produced.

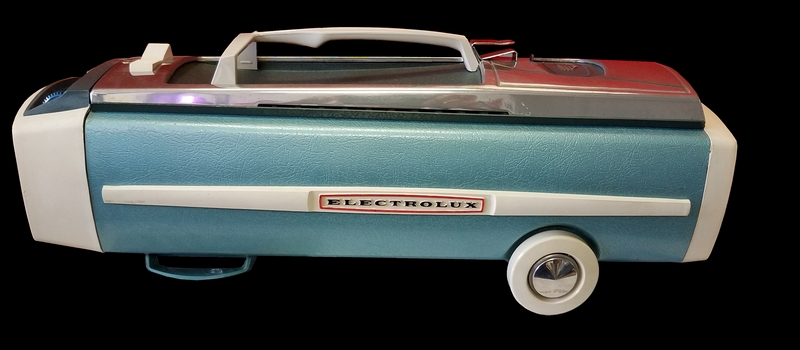
Electrolux Model 1205 1968–1974, First vacuum to use an electric hose. The design of this machine still influences modern Lux vacuums

In 1968, AB Electrolux sold its minority shares to Consolidated Foods, which then bought enough stock to make it the majority shareholder. That same time, Consolidated Foods also acquired Electrolux Canada Ltd. from AB Electrolux. Electrolux Corp USA and Electrolux Canada Ltd were independent companies and stayed that way until the mid-1980s. From the late 1960s to the late 1990s Electrolux Corp. was a subsidiary of Consolidated Foods. In 1970, Electrolux Corp. opened up its Bristol, VA manufacturing center which eventually replaced the much older Old Greenwich factory. As of 2024 it is still the main factory.

In 1998, Consolidated Foods (now Sara Lee) sold Electrolux Corp. to a firm owned by Joe Urso (who still owns the company). The company was then renamed Electrolux LLC. In 2000, the company sold certain name rights back to AB Electrolux which would go into effect in 2004. In 2001, the company began to transition into the new name: Aerus. In early 2004, the rights to the name "Electrolux" on products in North America ended. 2003 was the last year the company sold products that had the word "Electrolux" on them; however, Aerus LLC still holds certain rights to the Electrolux name and to the word "Lux." Electrolux LLC was formally renamed Aerus LLC.

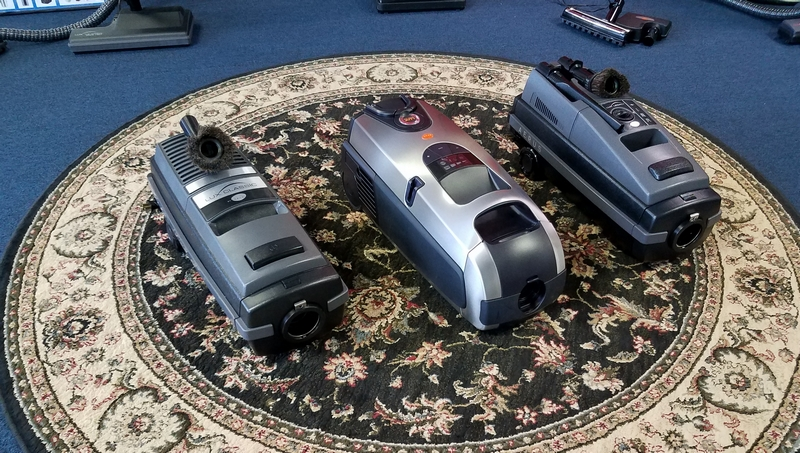
Aerus Lux canister vacuums in 2018. (From left to right) Lux Classic, Lux Platinum, Lux Legacy

Aerus currently makes and sells air purification systems and laundry care systems.
