= Human-interest story =

Type of soft news

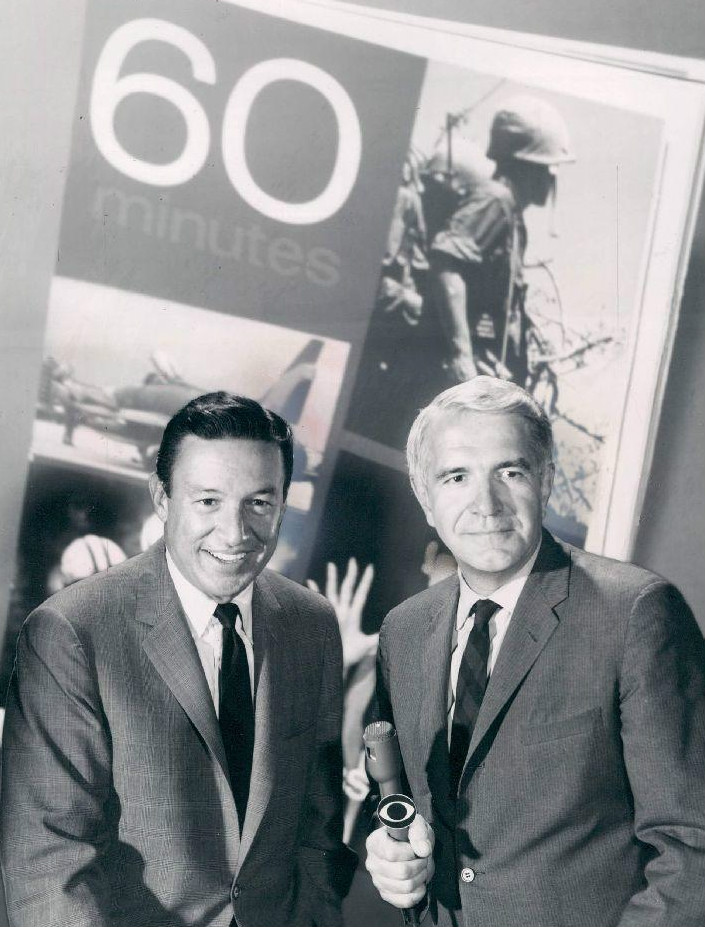
60 Minutes, a television program that frequently reports human-interest stories

In journalism, a human-interest story is a feature article that discusses people or pets in an emotional way. It presents people and their problems, concerns, or achievements in a way that brings about interest, sympathy or motivation in the reader or viewer. Human-interest stories are a type of soft news.

Human-interest stories may be "the story behind the story" about an event, organization, or otherwise faceless historical happening, such as about the life of an individual soldier during wartime, an interview with a survivor of a natural disaster, a random act of kindness, or profile of someone known for a career achievement. A study published in the American Behavioral Scientist illustrates that human-interest stories are furthermore often used in the news coverage of irregular immigration, although the frequency differs from country to country. Human-interest features are frequently evergreen content, easily recorded well in advance and/or rerun during holidays or slow news days.

The popularity of the human-interest format derives from the stories' ability to put the consumer at the heart of a current event or personal story through making its content relatable to the viewer in order to draw their interest. Human-interest stories also have the role of diverting consumers from "hard news" as they often are used to amuse consumers and leave them with a light-hearted story.

Human-interest stories are sometimes criticized as "soft" news, or manipulative, sensationalistic programming. Human-interest stories have been labelled as fictitious news reporting, used in an attempt to make certain content appear relevant to the viewer or reader. Human-interest stories are regarded by some scholars as a form of journalistic manipulation or propaganda, often published with the intention of boosting viewership ratings or attracting higher amounts of sales and revenue. Major human-interest stories are presented with a view to entertain the readers or viewers while informing them. Terry Morris, an early proponent of the genre, said she took "considerable license with the facts that are given to me".

The content of a human-interest story is not just limited to the reporting of one individual person, as they may feature a group of people, a specific culture, a pet or animal, a part of nature or an object. These reports may celebrate the successes of the person/topic in focus, or explore their troubles, hardships. The human-interest story is usually positive in nature, although they are also used to showcase opinions and concerns, as well sometimes being exposés or confrontational pieces.

== Background ==
Human-interest reporting arose in the first decade of the 20th century. Originally devised by women, the journalists writing them were initially known as sob sisters because the stories were often written to elicit sympathy for their subjects.

Within Western media, the human-interest story gained notoriety when these profile pieces were published in the American magazine The New Yorker, which began circulation in 1925. Scholars of journalism have put forward that the origin of the human-interest story dates back further than this, as they cite the 1791 biography The Life of Samuel Johnson as a profile piece in which the author James Boswell utilised research, interviews and his own experiences to formulate his work, all of which are instruments of standard practice for modern journalists.

The human-interest story has been used by the mass media to give hope and inspire its consumers. Profile pieces on certain individuals and groups have inspired evolution in the public's perception of a "hero". Scholars Winfield and Hume explore how heroes have evolved from cultural figures such as Abraham Lincoln, to regular people through the reporting of the human-interest story. Stories such as Esquire's interview with September 11 survivor Michael Wright portray the American hero as an ordinary person with an inspiring story or profound success.

The format of human-interest stories is not limited to just news segments during television reporting or articles in a newspaper. The human-interest frame is used in many different formats with no restricting time frame. The human-interest story is not just restricted to news reporting as there are documentary series and feature-length movies that follow the human-interest frame.

== Varieties ==
Human-interest stories are communicated through the mass media, and are presented in varying forms of broadcast media; such as television programming, radio and film, digital media; internet communication, websites, social media, and print media; newspapers, magazines and books. The wide consumption of the human-interest story has led to its prevalent reporting throughout the mass media, and its content varies across these different forms of media, although it maintains the goal of drawing an emotional response from the consumer.

=== Television reporting ===
Television reporting is the most popular form of news media and human-interest stories are common within news programming and are often used as a form of light-hearted news to end a broadcast after the "hard news" reporting. Televised human-interest stories often encompass interviews, and the reporting of information relevant to their topic, in order for the consumer to understand the situation and relate to its content. Within television reporting the human-interest frame can take many forms. It may be a short segment at the end of a news bulletin, a review of a current event from the human-interest frame or there may be entire reports dedicated to one particular human-interest story.

60 Minutes is a widely known American news program that has been adapted in other countries such as Australia and New Zealand. It is a program that often utilises investigative journalism to report its stories and is a producer of human interest stories. The program often features human-interest stories on prominent sporting figures, celebrities, controversial figures and criminals such as Oklahoma City bomber Timothy McVeigh.

=== Print media ===
Within print media, human-interest stories and their content vary across the variety of print mediums. They are commonly in the form of newspaper articles, in which the author details the story of a person/topic of focus through an interview, photographs and information. The author's opinion on the topic is often included in order for the consumer to respond in a similar manner. Human-interest stories may also take the form of opinion columns or editorial pieces within newspapers. Human-interest stories are also published in magazines and tabloids which often do not detail the story in the same manner as a newspaper and are often the subject to journalistic manipulation.

Newspaper publishers of significant notoriety such as The New York Times utilize the human-interest format in their works. An article titled "Invisible Child", written by Pulitzer Prize-winning journalist Andrea Elliott, concerned a homeless 11-year-old girl who lives in New York, and is listed in a list of the New York Times' 50 best-ever articles. The story focuses on the struggles of Dasani and goes into significant detail about the challenges she encounters during her daily life including her sleeping by a rotten wall or having to use a mop bucket as a toilet. The article uses the human-interest format to draw sadness and sympathy from the reader and try to make them understand how difficult life can be for some people.

=== Other media ===
Human-interest stories are also presented/ published in other forms of media such as digital media; consisting of websites and social media networks. Popular social media formats Facebook, Instagram and Twitter are becoming increasingly popular digital media forms where consumers are obtaining human-interest news. The prevalence of human-interest stories on social media is demonstrated through the popularity of the photo blog Humans of New York, a page which has over eighteen million Facebook likes and 10 million followers on Instagram. Humans of New York posts photos of New York citizens with an accompanying story about their life, and founder Brandon Stanton describes the purpose of the photo blog as being able "tell the story of the person right in front of me". The stories often evoke emotion from the reader and make them enjoy, sympathise or relate to the stories being told.

It has been cited that the popularity of the human-interest story stems from a concept known as "emotional arousal", as the emotions of readers and viewers when consuming human-interest stories are heightened due to the stories purpose and contents. Dutch news media studies have discovered that the human-interest frame can impact the virality of a story, with the findings revealing that the human-interest frame increased Facebook shares by 33% compared to articles not utilising the human-interest perspective.

== Reaction ==
The emotional response and interest the human-interest story draws from its consumers are reasons why the human-interest story is a widely utilised form of news media. The reception of the human-interest story has been mixed by both its audience and scholars alike. Studies from scholars reveal that when overused or given too much significance, the human-interest story can lose engagement from its viewers. But scholars such as journalism professor Perry Parks argue that walling off the human-interest story from serious news has led to an unhealthy split between emotionless "hard" news and affectively compelling "soft" news, and that in order for significant news to maintain its relevance journalists must reintroduce emotional elements to important news stories.

In an article from the Australian newspaper The Sydney Morning Herald this view is supported as the article's publisher Chloe Smethurst explains that the over exposure of human-interest stories have led real pieces of news to be discouraged or taken less seriously. However, The Sydney Morning Herald also puts forward the notion that the lighter moments of news can make a viewer's overall experience significantly more enjoyable and entertaining. This follows the traditional view that the human-interest stories' purpose is to take the audience's attention away from the "hard news" supplied by the reporting of current events and often provide a light-hearted segment for the consumer to enjoy towards the end of a news bulletin or within a newspaper.

== Impact ==
Human-interest stories and the emotional response they receive from consumers can often have an impact on the society in which their story is relevant. Scholars have detailed how there are cases where human-interest stories have "increased the attribution of responsibility to the government". This occurs when a piece of human-interest news generates a substantial public response which may give the topic further exposure or cause it to go viral. Once this occurs, the person, group or agenda of the news story may be heavily supported, which may incite company or government action, depending on whom the topic is targeting.

Craig Foster, a former Australian footballer and analyst for the Special Broadcasting Service, used the human-interest frame to advocate for Bahraini footballer Hakeem al-Araibi, an Australian political refugee who was detained in Thailand in 2018 as a result of an Interpol red notice. Foster, with the support of others, became an advocate for al-Araibi's story and campaigned for his freedom through the use of news reporting and social media, particularly Twitter. The presentation of al-Araibi's situation brought out much sympathy and anger from the public, and a petition put forward by Amnesty International labelled "#SaveHakeem", asking for his release, garnered over 60,000 signatures. al-Araibi was released in February 2019.

== See also ==
- Crônica
