= Montgomery Blair Sibley =

American lawyer

- Born: October 14, 1956 (age 69); Rochester, New York

Montgomery Blair Sibley (born October 14, 1956) is a former American lawyer who had his Florida Bar license suspended in 2008, and is best known for defending Deborah Palfrey, the "DC Madam", in 2007–2008.

Blair wrote a book about Palfrey, and his defense of her, entitled Why Just Her: The Judicial Lynching of the D.C. Madam, Deborah Jeane Palfrey. Henry Vinson, author of Confessions of a D.C. Madam, wrote that Sibley "had to contend with the fed's judicial chicanery and sleight of hand."

In 2008, The Florida Bar suspended Sibley's right to practice law in that state for three years. Sibley was later determined to be a vexatious litigator.

In 2012, Sibley unsuccessfully sued President Barack Obama, alleging that he was not a natural-born citizen.

== 2016 Presidential Election ==
In 2016, Sibley, who claims to have Palfrey's phone records, unsuccessfully attempted to have her records unsealed. Sibley claims the information they contain would be highly relevant to voters in the upcoming 2016 presidential election.

In February 2016, Sibley sued then-Chief Judge Richard W. Roberts, and his clerk, for failing to file his motion to lift the restraining order (gag order) that prevents Sibley from releasing her records.

Sibley then requested that the U.S. Supreme Court release him from the lower court's restraining order, stating: "To be clear, if Sibley is not allowed to file his Motion to Modify the Restraining Order and thereafter does not promptly receive a fair and impartial hearing on that Motion, he will justifiably consider the Restraining Order void as a result of being denied such a hearing by the District Court, the D.C. Circuit Court and now this Court."

The U.S. Supreme Court denied Sibley's application.
