= Defense Priorities =

American foreign policy think tank

- Formation: 2016; 10 years ago
- Type: Foreign policy think tank
- Tax ID no.: 81-0714113
- Legal status: 501(c)(3) nonprofit organization
- Location: Washington, D.C., United States
- President: Edward King
- Revenue: $3.37 million (2024)
- Website: www.defensepriorities.org

The Defense Priorities Foundation, also known as Defense Priorities, is an American foreign policy think tank based in Washington, D.C., that advocates for more restrained US foreign policy.

== History ==
Defense Priorities was established in early 2016 by supporters of United States Senator Rand Paul and funded by conservative donors Charles Koch and his brother David Koch. Early leadership included William P. Ruger of the Charles Koch Institute and Edward King of a pro-Paul political action committee. The organization was founded to advance Paul's foreign policy views, which argued for a "more prudent, restrained" United States foreign policy.

== Positions ==
Defense Priorities publications have advocated for ending Russia's invasion of Ukraine through negotiations, against the arming of rebels during the Syrian Civil War, against harsher sanctions on North Korea over its nuclear program, and against deeper military engagement in the Middle East. Defense Priorities has also argued for a weakening of U.S.-Taiwan relations in the political and military realm.

The think tank's leanings have been characterized as "isolationist", "non-interventionist", "libertarian", "pro-restraint", and "realist".

== Notable scholars and affiliates ==
- Daniel L. Davis
- Rajan Menon

== See also ==
- Quincy Institute for Responsible Statecraft
