= Paul Yingling =

United States Army colonel

Paul Yingling is a retired United States Army colonel, best known for a 2007 article in Armed Forces Journal that criticized senior military leadership for failures during the occupation of Iraq. Yingling served three tours in the Iraq War, then retired from the Army in late 2011 to teach high school social studies.

== Career ==
Yingling graduated from Duquesne University in 1989 with a degree in international relations, and was commissioned as a 2nd lieutenant in Field Artillery through Army ROTC. His first tour was with the 1st Infantry Division, where he served as a fire direction officer during the Gulf War. He attended FA Advanced Course and was assigned to the 41st Field Artillery Brigade in Germany, where he commanded a target acquisition battery. In December 1995, he deployed to Bosnia as part of the NATO IFOR.

He subsequently earned a master's degree in international relations from the University of Chicago and taught at West Point. He is also a graduate of the School of Advanced Military Studies at the Command and General Staff College in Fort Leavenworth, Kansas.

Yingling was a division planner with 2nd Infantry Division before his deployment to OIF I as executive officer of 2nd Battalion, 18th Field Artillery. His unit was tasked with collecting enemy ammunition and training the Iraqi Civil Defense Corps.

On his second deployment to Iraq, he served as effects coordinator for the 3rd Armored Cavalry Regiment from March 2005 to March 2006 during OIF III. He was responsible for information operations, public affairs, psychological operations, civil affairs, and Iraqi Security Forces development.

On his third deployment to Iraq, as J5 for Task Force 134 (Detainee Operations) from April 2008 to July 2009, he planned the transition from security detention under the UN mandate to criminal detention procedures under Iraqi domestic law.

Yingling was reportedly selected for promotion to colonel, but his military biography shows that he retired at the rank of lieutenant colonel.

Yingling retired from the U.S. Army in late 2011 to teach high school social studies. As he left, Yingling published an opinion piece in the Washington Post, expressing frustration with senior leadership in trying to reform an entrenched bureaucracy.

== Criticism of the United States Department of Defense ==
Yingling had made his dissatisfactions known in interviews conducted for the Army's oral history archives. He said that although "building host-nation institutions" was the crux of counterinsurgency strategy, "all our organizations are designed around the least important line of operations: combat operations".

In 2007, Yingling wrote "A Failure in Generalship", a commentary published by Armed Forces Journal on April 27. The Washington Post described it as "a blistering attack on U.S. generals" and a signal of the "public emergence of a split inside the military between younger, mid-career officers and the top brass". In the article, Yingling argues that the U.S. general corps needs to be overhauled because it failed to anticipate the post-invasion insurgency in Iraq, and because of its reluctance to admit the onset of such an insurgency in 2004. He likened Iraq to the Vietnam War: "for the second time in a generation, the United States faces the prospect of defeat at the hands of an insurgency". Because the Vietnam and Iraq wars were commanded by different generals, he concludes that the U.S. generalship as an institution, not individual generals, has failed. He proposes that the U.S. Congress take more interest in military affairs, especially when confirming generals. Generals, in his opinion, need to be aware that future U.S. wars will not involve one large enemy army but rather smaller, difficult-to-target groups of insurgents. He wrote that the United States needs generals to be more creative, as well as have a better understanding of military history, international relations, and foreign cultures.

== See also ==
- Lt. Col. John Nagl – co-author with Yingling in Field Artillery and Armed Forces Journal
- General David Petraeus – co-authored Counterinsurgency Field Manual with John Nagl
- Counterinsurgency operations in Tal Afar, under pioneering Colonel H.R. McMaster when commanding the 3rd Armoured Cavalry Regiment
- Colonel Gian Gentile – critic of counterinsurgency advocates
