= Edward C. Harwood =

American academic (1900–1980)

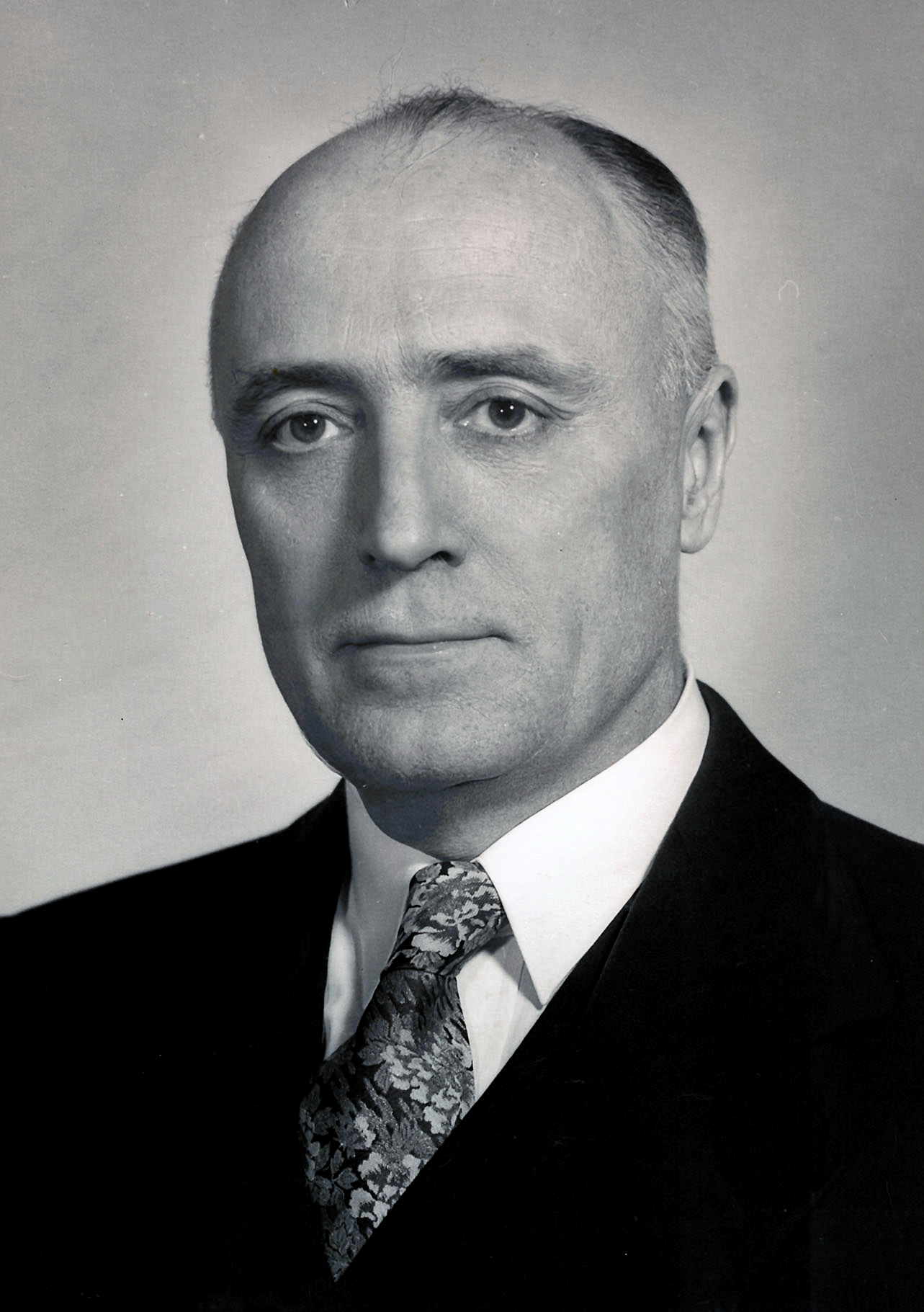
- Born: October 28, 1900; Cliftondale, Massachusetts
- Died: December 16, 1980 (aged 80); Montecito, California

Academic background
- Education: West Point (B.S.); RPI (B.S., M.Eng., M.B.A.)
- Influences: Henry George (land value taxation); John Dewey (early work in logic and correspondence on methodology with Arthur F. Bentley); Charles Sanders Peirce; William James; Gottfried Haberler(early work); L. Albert Hahn (later work); Ralph George Hawtrey; Henry Hazlitt; William Harold Hutt

Academic work
- Discipline: business cycles monetary policy investing philosophy of science
- Notable ideas: Opposed John Maynard Keynes (ideas promulgating economic interventionism); Alvin Hansen; Paul Samuelson; John Kenneth Galbraith

Edward Crosby Harwood (October 28, 1900 – December 16, 1980) was an American economist, philosopher of science, and investment advisor who is most known for founding the libertarian nonprofit American Institute for Economic Research (AIER) in 1933, which survives today in Great Barrington, Massachusetts. AIER is a scientific research organization specialized in economics. It is one of the oldest nonprofit research organizations in the U.S. It is the parent of a for-profit subsidiary, American Investment Services, Inc.

Harwood also established the Behavioral Research Council (BRC) in the early 1950s with two sociologists, George A. Lundberg and Stuart C. Dodd, both professors at the University of Washington. BRC was taken over by AIER in 1984, but some of its work continues tangentially at another nonprofit entity Harwood created called the Progress Foundation (PF), now based in Zurich, Switzerland. More specifically, today PF concerns itself with "conducting and disseminating independent research that fosters greater understanding of the factors that contribute to human progress".

== Early life and education ==
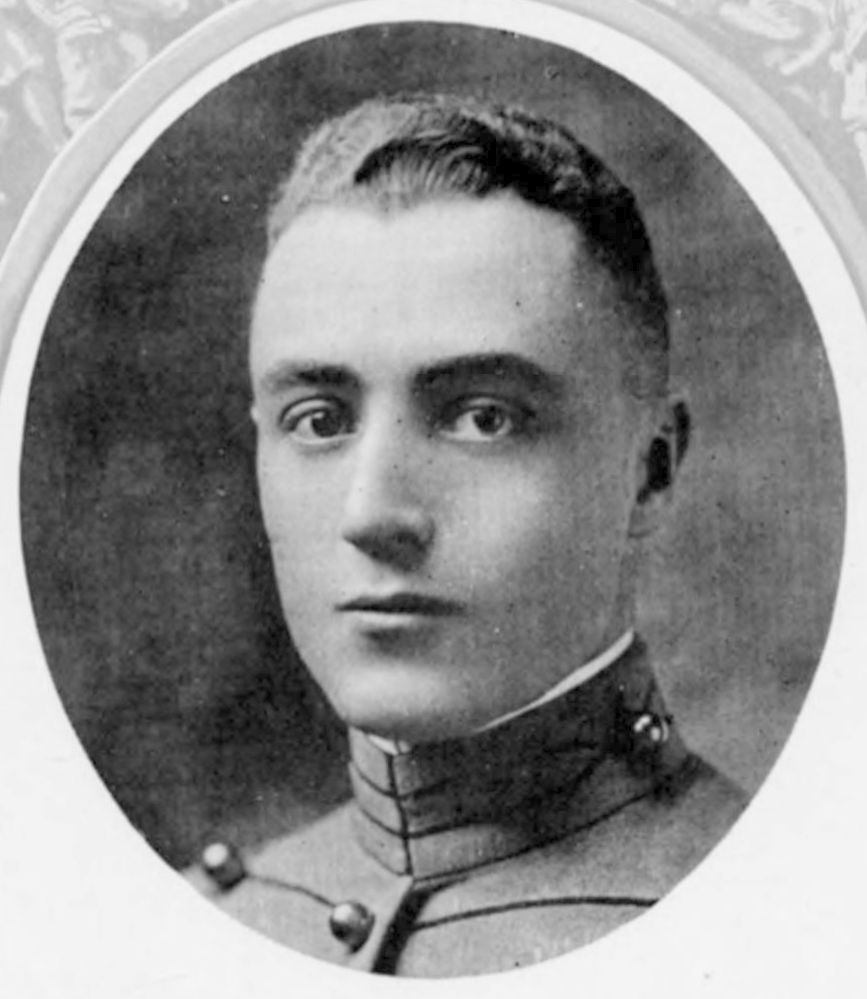
At West Point in 1920

Harwood was born in Cliftondale, Massachusetts on October 28, 1900. His family moved to Springfield, Massachusetts, when he was a child. His undergraduate work took place at West Point, from which he graduated as a military engineer in 1920.

Before and after two four-year stints on army bases in North Carolina and the Territory of Hawaii, he spent several years at Rensselaer Polytechnic Institute (RPI) earning his three degrees, a B.S., a M.Eng., and an M.B.A. In the early 1930s, he was appointed assistant professor of military science and tactics at the Massachusetts Institute of Technology (MIT), Cambridge, Massachusetts. After four years there, he was sent to Boston, where he oversaw the widening of the Cape Cod Canal for the War Department's Corps of engineers. Meanwhile, he was also appointed acting corps area engineer for the Works Project Administration's Civilian Conservation Corps program.

== Career ==
While living in the Cambridge area, Harwood associated with a number of businessmen and academics who were interested in his business cycle research. One of them was Vannevar Bush, then vice president of MIT, who, along with others, encouraged him to found the scientific research nonprofit AIER. He did so in 1933 and began publishing a newsletter for the educated layperson. The newsletters described the ramifications of current economic events and the results of statistical research on the business cycle and various market sectors. AIER's first booklet publication was "What Will Devaluation Mean To You?" Soon, AIER registered with the SEC and began publishing investment advice and managing a few customer accounts. Today, this work is carried on by a wholly owned subsidiary, American Investment Services, Inc.

Harwood became a popular speaker on the problems with monetary inflation and began touring the country and speaking to bankers associations and other professional groups. He retired from military service in 1938 and took up full-time economic and philosophical research at AIER, which was now housed in a building just off the Harvard campus in Cambridge.

His research and writing activities were interrupted in 1941, when he re-enlisted in the army to serve two years in England and two more in the Pacific on the islands of Leyte and Luzon under General "Pat" Casey and General Douglas MacArthur. Harwood advanced to the rank of colonel and earned the Legion of Merit and a Bronze Star Medal.

After his return, he devoted the rest of his life to his work in economics, investing, and scientific methodology. He resided for the most part in Great Barrington, Massachusetts, and also spent time in Bermuda; Lugano, Switzerland; and Montecito, California.

He was married twice, first to Harriet Haynes with whom he had three children (Marjorie, Edward, and Richard) and then to Helen Fowle with whom he had four children (William, Eve, Frederick, and Katherine). When he died in Montecito on December 16, 1980, he had thirteen grandchildren and ten great-grandchildren.

== Economics and philosophy of science ==
Harwood was an autodidact in economics in the style of Henry George, although he got two Master's degrees from RPI, one in civil engineering and one in business administration. Harwood's private studies on economics and on the philosophy of science began as a vocation in his early twenties, in the well-stocked libraries of the various Army bases where he resided. By 1928, he had become so learned that his articles on business and monetary conditions were published in well-known financial periodicals of the day such as The Annalist [sic] (a New York Times Company publication later sold to Business Week), Barron's, the Wall Street Magazine, Coast Investor & Industrial Review, Bankers Magazine, and others. By the time he was 40, more than 80 articles had been published.

His study of banking history and of the American economy convinced him in the late 1920s that the U.S. was headed for a crisis, and he predicted this in a number of his articles (see a few listed below). In 1932 he wrote his first full-length book, Cause and Control of the Business Cycle, and it was published by the Financial Publishing Company of Boston, Massachusetts. For its exposition of monetary phenomena in clear layperson's language, the book earned a recommendation of the Book-of-the-Month Club and was used as a college text by professors at Dartmouth and Stanford. The book sets forth his economic theories and gives Harwood's intricately derived but simply illustrated graph (the Harwood Index of Inflating) showing the amount of purchasing media in circulation, divided into various subcategories that are either "inflationary" or "noninflationary," according to clearly explained definitions.

Harwood's detailed analysis of statistics and economic history led him to a number of what he considered to be "warranted assertions". One of these was the following: that two market-evolved monetary mechanisms functioned relatively well together, and they were the cornerstones of several healthy national economies, at least up until the creation of the Federal Reserve System. These two mechanisms were (1) the gold standard, and (2) what he called "sound commercial banking". Sound commercial banking, in his view, required three things: (1) the separation of the commercial banking function from the investment banking function; (2) that commercial banks be the only entities allowed to create and issue self-liquidating money (or what he preferred to call "purchasing media") based only upon commercial transactions for things coming to market in the short term; and (3) that investment banking departments should not create money, but rather only issue credit based on real savings, which are, in fact, claims on existing things, i.e. delayed consumption. Harwood's analysis brought him to the further conclusion that the abandonment of the gold standard, the loss of sound commercial banking principles, and the subtle growth of the Federal Reserve's powers to create money in place and stead of the commercial banks would, in the long run, disrupt monetary equilibrium and undermine the U.S. dollar.

He defined purchasing media for the academic community in very specific terms. However, for the layperson, he recommended that people think of purchasing media as coins, paper currency, or checks that are claims on goods or services, much as is implied in the expression "promissory notes." He used the metaphor of a baggage claim check. Banks issuing paper notes should only do so, he claimed, in direct ratio to the amount of gold in their vaults (under a gold standard) and to the things their customers were bringing to market; and any issuance above that amount would be, by definition, "inflationary," i.e. it will tend to cause price increases over and above those caused by direct cause-effect relationships among normal supply and demand forces. Such "inflationary" price increases are different from those caused, for example, by a shortage of supply or by a rise in demand, because they are caused by a devaluation of the purchasing media itself through excessive issuance.

Not only did Harwood predict the Great Depression, but he was one of the first investment advisors to steer his clients into gold-related investments before the 1970s dollar devaluation and abandonment of the gold standard. By the late 1950s Harwood had concluded that monetary policy would lead to the depreciation of the dollar. By 1958 his research noted an outflow of gold from the U.S. and the beginning of an increase in the gold price on the London market. By September 1958 he was predicting another devaluation of the dollar and began recommending the purchase of gold mining shares to protect one's savings. This fact probably makes him one of the original Gold Bugs of the 20th century.

BRC, the nonprofit Harwood created with Lundberg and Dodd, set forth a set of rules for the methodology to be used in the social (otherwise known as behavioral) sciences (e.g., psychology, sociology, economics), which rules are similar to those so effectively used in the harder sciences (e.g., physics, biology, chemistry). What BRC referred to as the "transactional approach" (not to be confused with Transactional Analysis), followed very specific procedures of inquiry best described by John Dewey and Arthur F. Bentley in their book, Knowing and the Known. Harwood also studied and adhered to some of the work of Charles Sanders Peirce and William James.

Early in his life, Harwood developed great respect for the Founding Fathers of America and for their forebears, who had developed a wise reverence for certain individual liberties, property rights, the sanctity of contracts, and the necessity to limit government from its own expansive tendencies; and for the protections of all of these that are embodied in the U.S. Constitution. His clear explanations of complicated monetary phenomena helped thousands of readers understand economic events and enabled them to preserve the value of their savings throughout the 20th century's monetary experiments on and off the gold standard. A couple of years before his death, Harwood was honored by becoming the first of three living economists to have his likeness engraved on a gold piece. The others were Nobel prizewinner Friedrich Hayek and well known economics author Henry Hazlitt. Harwood's colleagues nicknamed him "the George Washington of the modern sound money movement". AIER continues to serve the public today.

== Selected articles predicting the 1929 Great Depression ==
- Harwood, Edward C. (1928), "The Probable Consequences to Our Credit Structure of Continued Gold Export," The Annalist (March 23, 1928)
- – (1928), "The Underlying Causes of Our Recent Prosperity: Why the End is Near," The Annalist (April 13, 1928)
- – (1929), "Speculation in Securities vs. Commodity Speculation," The Annalist (February 15, 1929)
- – (1929), "Deterioration of the American Bank Portfolio – a Ratio Analysis, 1920–28," The Annalist (August 2, 1929)

== Selected works ==
- Harwood, Edward C. (1932), Cause and Control of the Business Cycle, Boston: Financial Publishing Company; (1974) 10th ed. published as "Cause and Control of the Business Cycle," Economic Education Bulletin (AIER) Volume XIV (No. 9) LCCN 60-331
- –, Donald G. Ferguson, et al. (1941), What will Inflation and Devaluation Mean to You?, Cambridge, MA: AIER, LCCN 41-17897
- –, Helen Fowle (1950), How to Make Your Budget Balance, Great Barrington, MA: AIER LCCN 50-2703
- – (1955), "Reconstruction of Economics," Economic Education Bulletin, Great Barrington, MA: AIER, Volume X (No. 10)
- – (1956), "Useful Economics," Economic Education Bulletin, Great Barrington, MA: AIER, Volume X (No. 5)
- –, Rollo Handy (1973), Useful Procedures of Inquiry, Great Barrington, MA: Behavioral Research Council, LCCN 72-93865, ISBN 0913610003
- –, Rollo Handy (1973), Current Appraisal of the Behavioral Sciences, Great Barrington, MA: Behavioral Research Council, LCCN 73-79255, ISBN 0913610011
- – (1976), The Money Mirage, Hamilton, Bermuda: Freedom Trust
- –, Many articles in the Research Reports and variously named economic bulletins (available to Annual Sustaining Members of AIER at their website), investment guides, and other booklets published by AIER and its former investment advisor subsidiary, American Institute Counselors, Inc.

== Bibliography ==
- AIER, Investment Bulletin, September 15, 1958
- AIER, Research Reports, June 10, 1957; April 21, 1958
- The Berkshire Eagle, "Col. E. C. Harwood, 80; was founder of AIER". Great Barrington. December 17, 1980. Retrieved December 12, 2022 – via Newspapers.com.
- Cullum, George Washington (1920). Robinson, Wirt (ed.). Biographical Register of the Officers and Graduates of the U.S. Military Academy at West Point, N.Y. From Its Establishment, in 1802, to 1890. Vol. VI-B: 1910–1920. Association of Graduates, United States Military Academy. Retrieved December 12, 2022 – via Google Books.
- Harwood, Edward C. (September 1974), "Cause and Control of the Business Cycle," Economic Education Bulletin (AIER) Volume XIV (No. 9) LCCN 60-331; originally published in hardcover (1932) Cause and Control of the Business Cycle, Boston, MA: Financial Publishing Company
- Harwood, Edward C. (1976), The Money Mirage, Hamilton, Bermuda: Freedom Trust
- Harwood, Edward C. and Rolly Handy (1973), Useful Procedures of Inquiry, Great Barrington, MA: Behavioral Research Council, LCCN 72-93865, ISBN 0913610003
- Harwood, Frederick C. and Murray, Charles, ed., Sion, Michael, writer (2008), The Golden Constant, Chelsea, MI: Sheridan Books, ISBN 978-0913610626
- (undated, c. 2009), Welcome, Great Barrington, MA: AIER (general information brochure about and by AIER)
