= Daniel L. Davis =

American military officer and whistleblower

- Education: Texas Tech University
- Known for: Whistleblowing; analyzing war, national security, and international affairs
- Military career
- Allegiance: United States
- Branch: United States Army; Army Reserve
- Rank: Lieutenant colonel
- Conflicts: Gulf War; Iraq War; War in Afghanistan
- Awards: Bronze Star Medal (2)

Daniel L. Davis is a retired United States Army officer and an analyst of United States foreign policy. He was one of the earliest military officers to publicly criticize the War in Afghanistan.

== Early life and education ==
Davis was raised in Dallas, Texas, and enlisted in the United States Army in 1985. He briefly left military service to complete his bachelor's degree from Texas Tech University, then was commissioned a second lieutenant through the Reserve Officer Training Corps program. He later received a master's degree in international relations from Troy University.

== Career ==
=== Military service ===
Davis served in Germany and Iraq, earning the Bronze Star during Operation Desert Storm in 1991. Later, Davis left the Army to work in the private sector, while continuing to serve in the United States Army Reserve. In 2002, after the September 11 attacks, Davis returned to active duty. He was initially posted to the Pentagon. He deployed to Afghanistan twice, in 2005 and 2011, and to Iraq in 2009. During the second deployment to Afghanistan, Davis was decorated with a second Bronze Star. He retired at the rank of lieutenant colonel on 1 August 2015.

==== Whistleblower ====
Davis was disturbed by what he felt was a program of official deception being presented to the public on the success of the War in Afghanistan. In 2012, after returning to the United States, he sent a report on his observations to the Department of Defense Office of Inspector General. Unclassified versions of the report were copied to several members of the United States Congress and The New York Times.

Davis also wrote an article, "Truth, Lies, and Afghanistan: How Military Leaders Have Let Us Down”, published by Armed Forces Journal in February 2012. The article drew praise from several U.S. lawmakers and received national press coverage, including by The New York Times, Time, and NPR.

=== Later career ===
In 2020, Davis published the book, Eleventh Hour in 2020 America: How America's Foreign Policy Got Jacked Up – and How the Next Administration Can Fix It.

In 2025, Davis was selected by Director of National Intelligence Tulsi Gabbard for appointment as deputy director for mission integration. Gabbard withdrew her selection after criticism from hawkish Republican lawmakers due to Davis criticism of Israel.

As of 2025, he is a Senior Fellow at the Defense Priorities Foundation. He also hosts the Daniel Davis Deep Dive podcast, analyzing war, national security, and politics.

== Legacy ==
The Project On Government Oversight has described Davis as "one of the earliest public critics inside the military speaking out about the mounting failures in the Afghanistan War". He was awarded the Ridenhour Prize for Truth-Telling for his 2012 report on the war.

== Personal life ==
According to Davis, his favorite film is Mr. Smith Goes to Washington.
