= Huntington Wilson =

American diplomat (1875–1946)

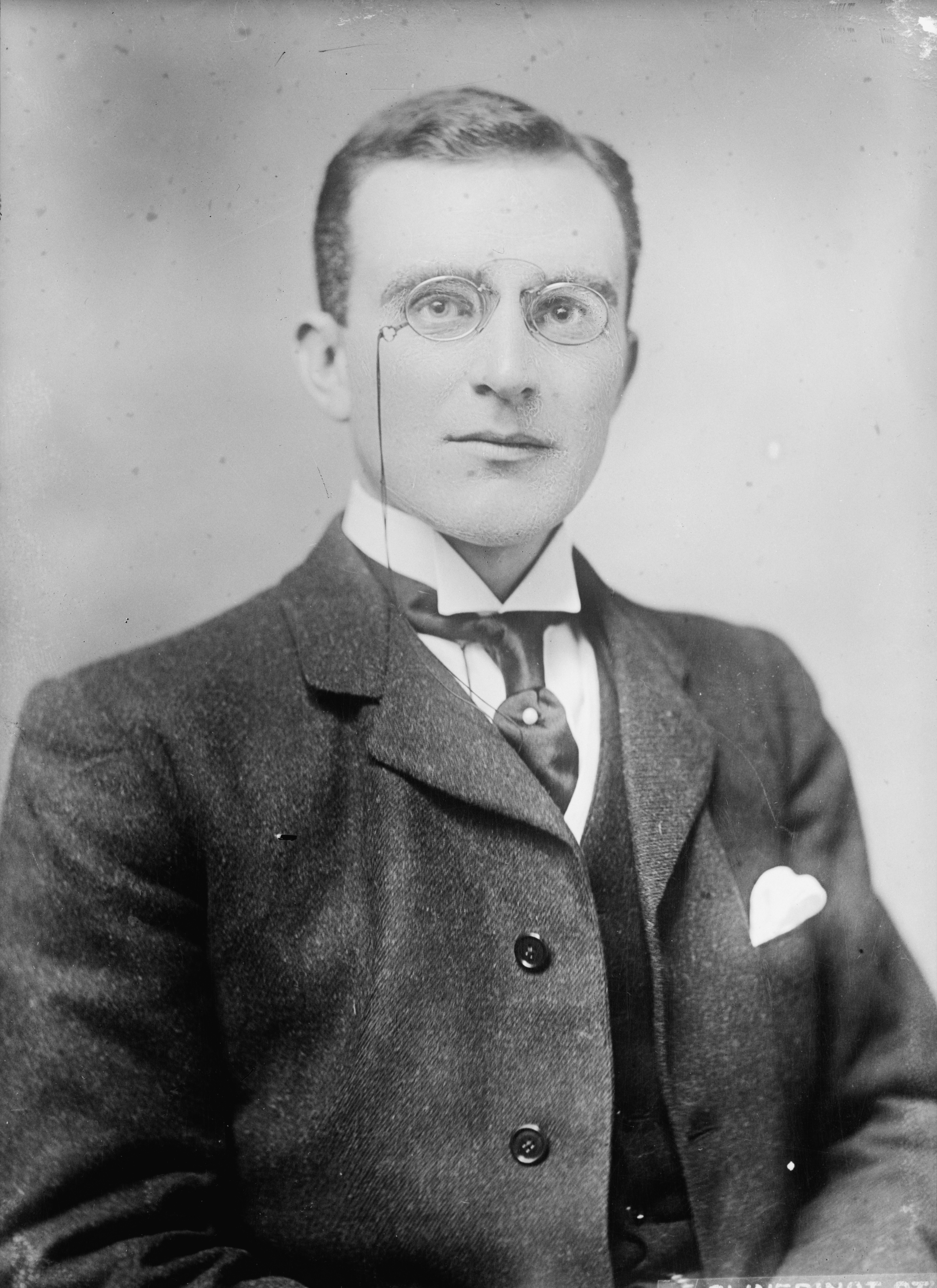
Huntington Wilson

Francis Mairs Huntington Wilson (December 15, 1875 – December 31, 1946) was a United States diplomat and author who served as United States Assistant Secretary of State from 1909 to 1913.

== Biography ==
Huntington Wilson was born in Chicago, the son of Benjamin Mairs Wilson and Frances (Huntington) Wilson. Wilson was educated at Yale University, receiving an A.B. in 1897.

After college, Wilson joined the United States Consular and Diplomatic Service, becoming a Second Secretary at the United States Legation in Tokyo. He was promoted to First Secretary in 1900 and then to Chargé d’Affaires in 1901. He married Lucy Wortham James in 1904. The couple would divorce in 1915.

Wilson returned to the United States in 1906, becoming Third Assistant Secretary of State in Washington, D.C., and the chairman of the board of Examiners of the Consular and Diplomatic Service.

With the outbreak of the Young Turk Revolution in 1908, President of the United States Theodore Roosevelt named Wilson Envoy Extraordinary and Minister Plenipotentiary to the Ottoman Empire. He was also sent on a mission to Argentina.

Returning to the U.S. again in 1909, Wilson became the United States Assistant Secretary of State during the Taft administration, which at the time was the second-ranking position in the State Department, after Secretary of State Philander C. Knox. Knox, in addition to being ignorant of foreign affairs, was very lax about his official duties, and Wilson was, in his own words, "frequently left in charge of the Department for months at a time." In this capacity, Wilson was responsible for drawing up and implementing a reorganization of the United States Department of State. Wilson attempted to retire due to factors inside the State Department but was persuaded to remain for another two years.

Wilson retired from government service in 1913 and settled in Philadelphia. There, he wrote for the Public Ledger and the Evening Bulletin. He also began writing books at this time, with his published titles including Stultitia (1914), The Peril of Hifalutin (1918), Money and the Price Level (1932), and Memoirs of an Ex-Diplomat (1945). He became an hereditary member of the Rhode Island Society of the Cincinnati in 1908. He married his second wife, Lucille O'Hara Powell, in December 1915; they were divorced in 1917.

He worked briefly for the National City Bank in New York City, before becoming president of a Waterbury, Connecticut, company that made signaling devices. He then returned to Philadelphia, serving as director of the Philadelphia Commercial Museum from 1928 to 1932. Wilson married his third wife, Hope Butler of New York City, in 1925.

Wilson died in New Haven, Connecticut, on December 31, 1946.

== Works by Huntington Wilson ==
- Stultitia: A Nightmare and an Awakening - In Four Discussions (1914)
- The Peril of Hifalutin (1918)
- Money and the Price Level (1932)
- Memoirs of an Ex-Diplomat (1945)

Government offices
Preceded by Herbert Henry Davis Peirce	Third Assistant Secretary of State; July 2, 1906 – December 30, 1908	Succeeded by William Phillips
Preceded by John Callan O'Laughlin	United States Assistant Secretary of State; March 5, 1909 – March 13, 1913	Succeeded by John Eugene Osborne
