= William P. Ruger =

American academic

William Ruger
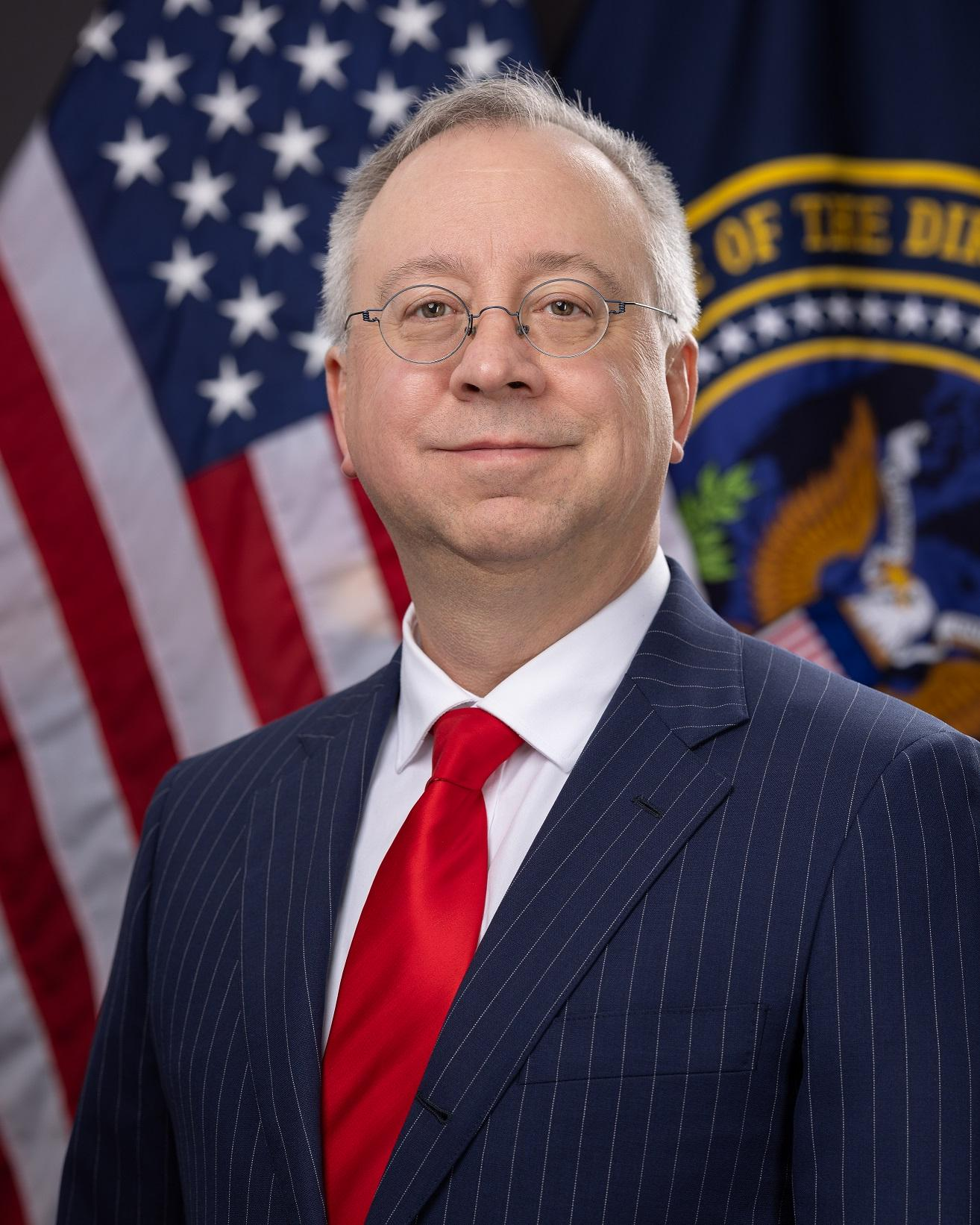

Personal details
- Education: College of William and Mary (BA, MA); Brandeis University (PhD)

Military service
- Allegiance: United States
- Branch/service: United States Navy
- Battles/wars: War in Afghanistan

William P. Ruger (born 1971) was formerly the United States Deputy Director of National Intelligence for Mission Integration in the administration of Donald Trump.

Ruger was appointed to this position in April 2025, and served under Director of National Intelligence Tulsi Gabbard. As Deputy Director, he was responsible for preparing daily intelligence briefings for the president. Media reports of his views describe Ruger as a supporter of the MAGA wing of the Republican Party, and as a foreign policy isolationist and "Iran Dove."

In June 2026, Ruger was removed from his position and placed on administrative leave by Acting Director of National Intelligence Bill Pulte. Ruger, who "effectively led" the National Intelligence Council, was the highest ranking figure to be removed out of a half-dozen political appointees and several dozen career officers, according to the Washington Post.

== Biography ==
Ruger earned a Bachelor of Arts degree from the College of William & Mary and a PhD in politics from Brandeis University. Ruger fought in the War in Afghanistan as a member of the United States Navy Reserve.

Ruger worked as a professor of political science at Texas State University and the Lyndon B. Johnson School of Public Affairs.

Prior to joining the Trump administration, Ruger served as vice president for research and policy at the Charles Koch Institute from 2014 to 2019 and as vice president for foreign policy at Stand Together from 2019 to 2022. From 2022 to April 2025 he served as the president of the American Institute for Economic Research.

He has served on the Board of Directors for the Center for the National Interest and the board of American Conservative Magazine. He is also a non-resident senior fellow at Defense Priorities.

In September 2020, Ruger was nominated by President Donald Trump to serve as the United States Ambassador to Afghanistan. Prior to his nomination, Ruger had advocated for the complete withdrawal of U.S. troops from Afghanistan. Ruger has been associated with the foreign policy realism movement. On January 3, 2021, his nomination was returned to the President under Rule XXXI, Paragraph 6 of the United States Senate.

== Policy Positions ==
Ruger is known among foreign policy circles as Realist. Ruger supported U.S. withdrawal from Afghanistan during the first Trump and Biden administrations. He is a skeptic of U.S. military and financial support for Ukraine following the Russian Invasion of Ukraine. In June 2023, Ruger delivered a keynote lecture urging a peaceful solution to the war in Ukraine at the Mathias Corvinus Collegium Peace Forum in Budapest, Hungary. In 2024 Ruger co-organized a letter opposing the admission of Ukraine into NATO.

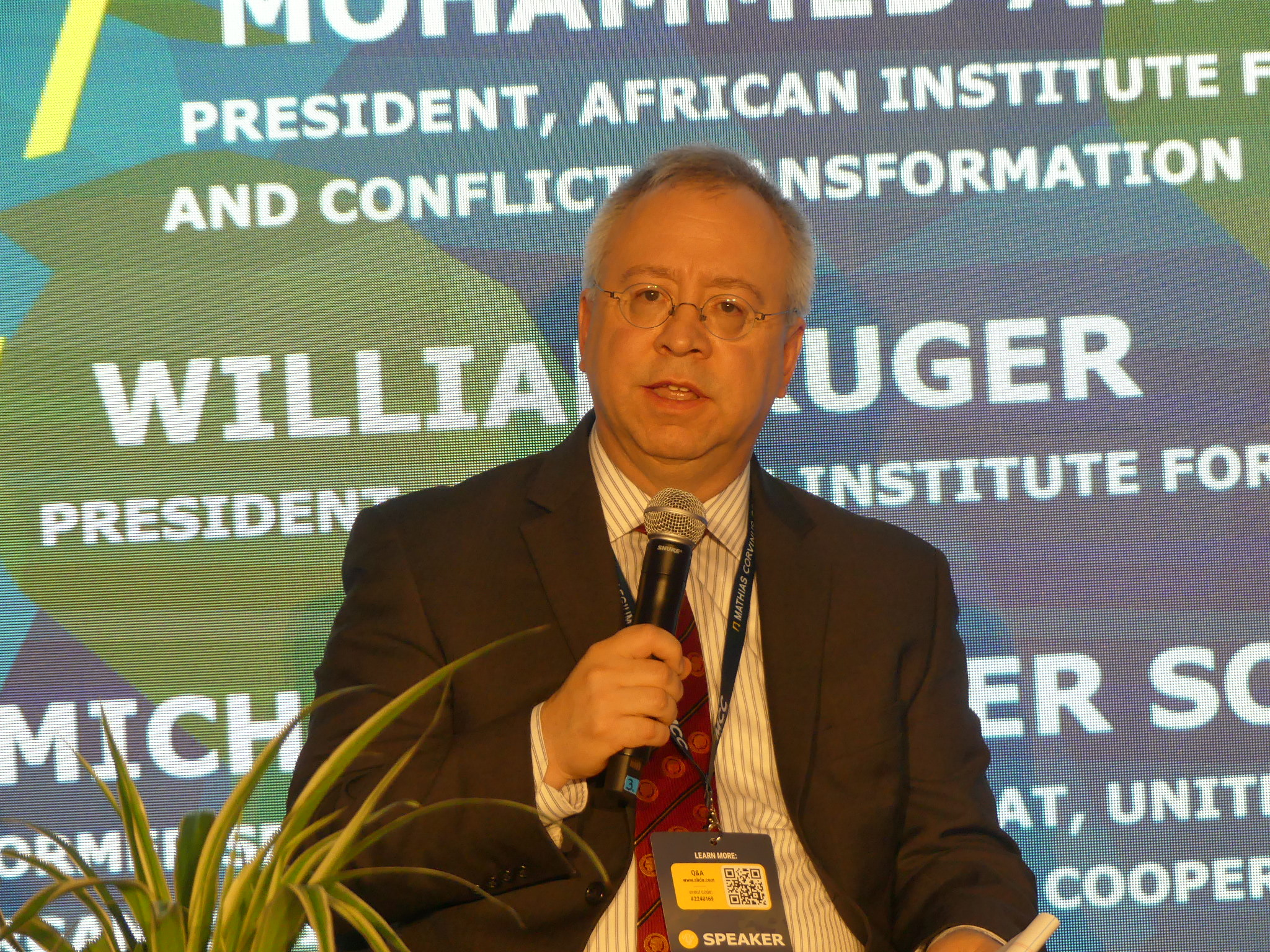
William Ruger speaking at the Mathias Corvinus Collegium Peace Forum in June 2023.

During the 2024 presidential election, Ruger endorsed the selection of JD Vance as Donald Trump's running mate, arguing that this choice was a repudiation of the neoconservative wing of the Republican Party. He is listed as a foreign policy advisor to Project 2025.

Ruger has opposed Trump's tariff policies in 2018 and 2019, posting on Twitter that they will harm Americans, particularly farmers. Ruger has since deleted these posts. Ruger also wrote an op-ed in the New York Times stating that "America’s approach to the world just isn’t working to make us safer and more prosperous. And President Trump isn’t helping."

More recently, Ruger issued a statement to the press that the President is "rightly putting Americans first" by "making sure that our trade policies don’t undermine our national security needs while getting tough on countries with unfair trade practices."
