= John Callan O'Laughlin =

American journalist (1873–1949)

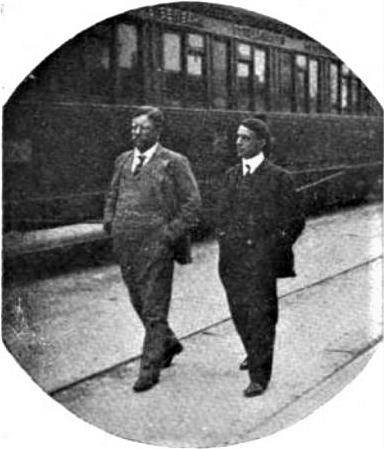
- O'Laughlin (right) with Theodore Roosevelt

27th United States Assistant Secretary of State
- In office January 28, 1909 – March 5, 1909
- President: Theodore Roosevelt; William Howard Taft
- Preceded by: Robert Bacon
- Succeeded by: Huntington Wilson

Personal details
- Born: January 11, 1873 Washington, D.C., U.S.
- Died: March 14, 1949 (aged 76) Washington, D.C., U.S.
- Resting place: Arlington National Cemetery
- Party: Republican
- Spouse: Mabel Hudson (m. 1896; died 1947)
- Education: Columbia University
- Occupation: Journalist

John Callan O'Laughlin (January 11, 1873 – March 14, 1949) was a journalist and longtime publisher of the Army and Navy Journal. He served as the United States Assistant Secretary of State from January to March 1909.

== Early life ==
John Callan O'Laughlin was born on January 11, 1873, in Washington, D.C. He attended public schools and took a course in European diplomacy at Columbia University.

== Career ==
From 1893 to 1902, O'Laughlin wrote for the Washington bureau of the New York Herald. In 1902, he traveled to Venezuela and reported on the naval blockade there. From 1903 to 1904, he was on the European staff of the Associated Press. He was in Moscow during the Russo-Japanese War. In 1905, he began working for the Chicago Tribune. He moved in 1909 back to Washington, D.C., and served as a correspondent for the Tribune. He remained with the paper until 1914 when he became the Washington correspondent for the Chicago Herald. After World War I, he purchased and published the Army and Navy Journal, a weekly periodical covering American military and world affairs.

He served as secretary of the United States Commission to the Tokyo Exposition in 1908 and 1911. On January 27, 1909, O'Laughlin was commissioned as the Assistant Secretary of State. He served in the role for a couple months, from January 28, 1909, to March 5, 1909. He then declined the position of United States Assistant Secretary of the Treasury. He also declined the post of minister to Argentina. He was secretary to Theodore Roosevelt during Roosevelt's African expedition. He wrote "From the Jungle through Europe with Roosevelt" in 1910 from this experience.

In 1917, O'Laughlin became vice president of the advertising firm Lord & Thomas. He was a delegate to the 1912 Progressive National Convention. In January 1918, O'Laughlin was commissioned as a major in the U.S. Army. He served as an aide to his friend George Washington Goethals. He then served in the intelligence section of the Army.

In 1920, he was executive secretary of the policy committee of the Republican National Committee (RNC). He was assistant to the chairman of the RNC from 1933 to 1934. Following World War II, Herbert Hoover planned to influence the European Recovery Plan using O'Laughlin as his agent, but George C. Marshall and Harry Truman shaped the plan instead.

== Personal life ==
O'Laughlin married Mabel Hudson of Philadelphia on July 15, 1896. His wife died in 1947. He was a member of the University Club, Chevy Chase Club, and the Gridiron Club. He was a member of the Society of International Law.

O'Laughlin died on March 14, 1949, at Walter Reed General Hospital. He was buried in Arlington National Cemetery.

== Awards and legacy ==
O'Laughlin received an honorary Master of Arts and Doctor of Laws degrees from Villanova University. He was a recipient of the Order of Saint Stanislaus from Russia, the Order of the Crown of Italy, the Order of the Sacred Treasure from Japan, and the Order of the Liberator from Venezuela. His papers are held by the Library of Congress.

Political offices
Preceded by Robert Bacon	United States Assistant Secretary of State; 1909	Succeeded by Huntington Wilson
