= Hope Butler =

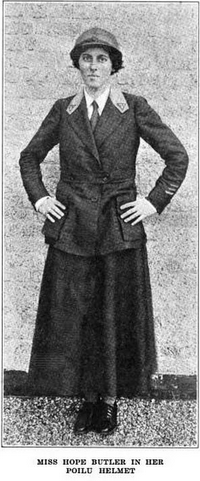
Hope Butler in uniform, from a 1918 publication.

Elsie Hopestill "Hope" Butler Wilson (August 18, 1893 – January 26, 1984) was an American ambulance driver, canteen operator, and relief worker in France and Serbia during World War I and in occupied Germany in the postwar period. She organized a unit of women volunteer ambulance drivers with Marguerite Standish Cockett.

== Early life ==
Elsie Hopestill Butler was the daughter of Robert Gordon Butler and Mary Leland Thorp Butler of New York City. She grew up in Orange and South Orange, NJ. Her sister Marjorie Butler Harrison was active as a clubwoman in Philadelphia. Her other sister was Eleanor Butler Marindin. Their great-grandfather was Benjamin Franklin Butler, attorney general in the Andrew Jackson administration., and their uncle was N. Howard Thorp, who was instrumental in preserving cowboy songs and verse.

== In World War I ==
Hope Butler and Marguerite Standish Cockett, an American doctor, "organized the first American ambulance unit driven by women in the French army." They wore uniforms as French soldiers, and were housed with them. Later they joined the Red Cross in Serbia, and built a canteen as part of the Women's Division of the YMCA. After two years in Europe, Butler returned to the United States to give lectures and raise funds for war work, then was back in Europe for post-war efforts, including a turn on the YMCA's women's baseball team, touring to entertain American troops.

Butler, like some other women volunteers, wore her hair short while working in Europe, a fact that was considered newsworthy at the time. "One couldn't keep one's hair clean, getting under cars to mend them, sleeping in garages, on planks anywhere," she explained, "so I cut mine off." In 1918, Butler served as a courier for the British delegation at the Allied Congress of Women in Paris. She was honored with a decoration by the French Government after the war.

== Personal life ==
In 1925, Hope Butler became the third wife of Francis Mairs Huntington Wilson, a writer and former diplomat, when they wed in Zurich. She was widowed when he died in 1946. She was still alive in December 1951 when her mother's will was probated.
