= Armed Forces Journal =

American magazine

- Former editors: William Conant Church; Willard Church; Henry J. Reilly; John Callan O'Laughlin; LeRoy Whitman; Daniel Z. Henkin; Benjamin Schemmer; John Roos; Thomas Donnelly; Karen Walker; Bradley Peniston
- Categories: Journal
- Frequency: Monthly
- Circulation: 27,000
- Publisher: Michael Reinstein
- Founder: William Conant Church, Francis Pharcellus Church
- First issue: August 29, 1863
- Final issue: April 2014
- Company: Sightline Media Group
- Country: United States
- Based in: Springfield, Virginia
- Language: English
- Website: armedforcesjournal.com
- ISSN: 0196-3597

Armed Forces Journal (AFJ) was a publication for American military officers and leaders in government and industry.

Created in 1863 as a weekly newspaper, AFJ was published under various names by various owners in various formats for more than 150 years. The publication went all-digital after the July/August 2013 issue, and last updated its website on April 29, 2014.

The brand is currently owned by Sightline Media Group, a holding of private equity firm Regent, which bought the media group in 2016 from Tegna.

== History ==
=== 1800s ===
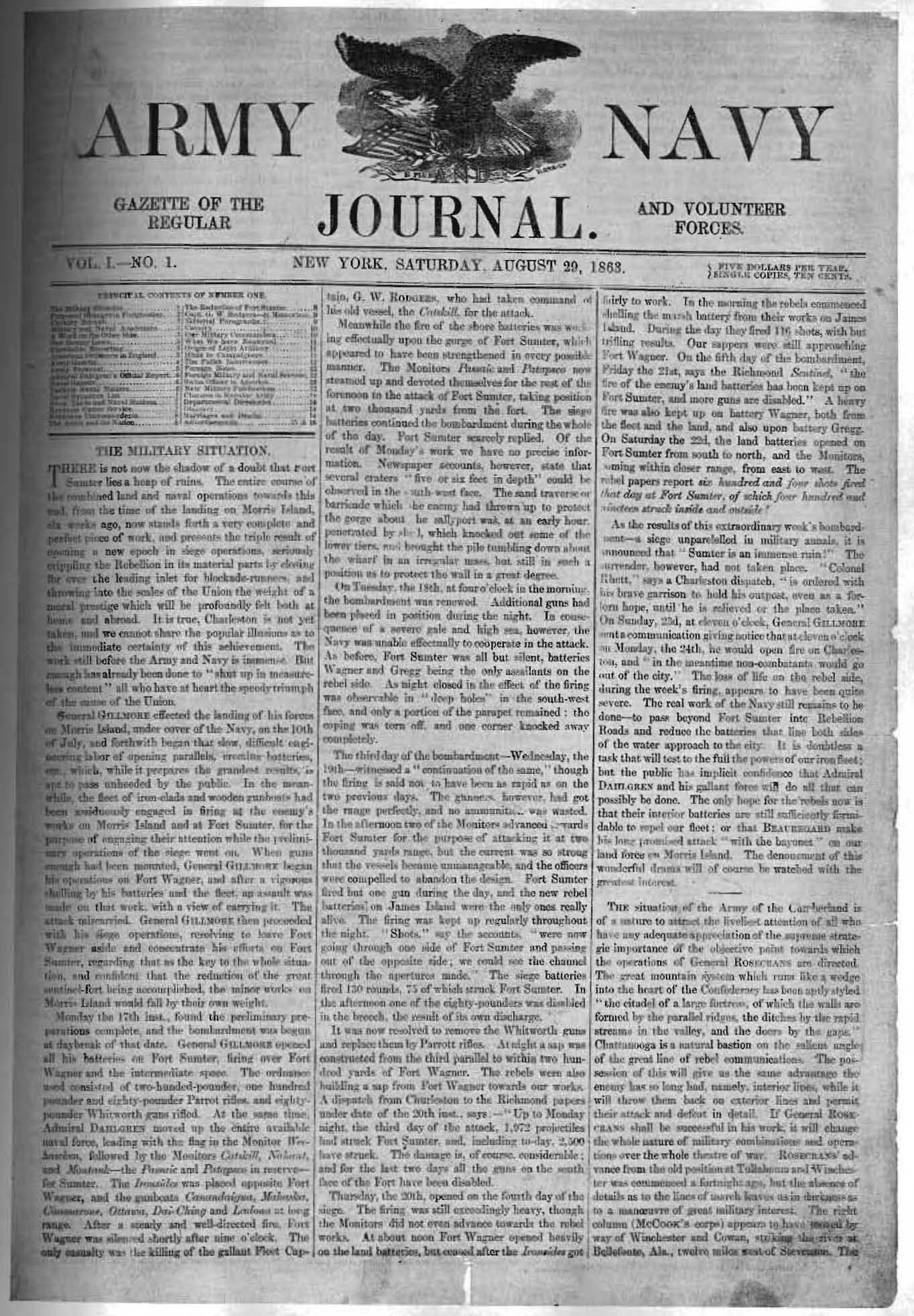
Page 1 of the first issue, published August 29, 1863

The publication was founded as The Army and Navy Journal and Gazette of the Regular and Volunteer Forces, a weekly newspaper printed in New York City. Its founders were brothers Francis Pharcellus Church and William Conant Church. William was a newspaperman and American Civil War veteran. In his youth, he had helped his father edit and publish the New York Chronicle; in 1860, aged 24, he became publisher of the New York Sun, and the following year, took a job as the Washington correspondent of The New York Times. In 1862, he was appointed a captain in the United States Volunteers; he served for one year, receiving brevets of major and lieutenant colonel.

Francis, who had covered the Civil War as a reporter for The New York Times, would go on to write for the Sun, where he penned one of the most famous editorials in American journalism: Yes, Virginia, there is a Santa Claus.

The first issue was published on August 29, 1863, with this motto: "Established in obedience to an insistent demand for an official organ for members of the American Defense and those concerned with it." The paper included news of the Civil War, then in its third year, along with "important official reports, lists of promotions, discussions upon the various appliances and methods of war, editorial comments upon the various naval and military questions of the day, and a great mass of information for the use of professional and non-professional readers." A single copy cost 10 cents; an annual subscription was five dollars.

Two years later, The New York Times noted the publication of the second annual bound volume of the newspaper's issues. "The proprietors of the Army and Navy Journal, in commencing the publication of their paper two years ago, sought to supply what hitherto we had been without – an organ devoted to the military and naval history and organizations of the United States. That they have fully succeeded, the great mass of material in the volume before us amply proves."

In the decade after the war, the Army and Navy Journal played a role in the increasing professionalization of the U.S. military. It was not a professional journal like several others that appeared after the war, but "...along with its social and other items about service personnel it carried articles, correspondence, and news of interest to military people that helped bind its readers together in a common professional fraternity."

William Church would go on to help found the National Rifle Association of America in 1871; he and his newspaper remained fixtures in the political firmament for decades.

From 1894–95, the newspaper's naval editor was Winston Churchill — not the future British prime minister, but rather a recent graduate of the U.S. Naval Academy who had organized the first 8-man rowing squad there and who would go on to a career as a novelist.

=== 1900s ===
On January 19, 1903, William Church was the guest of honor at a dinner at Delmonico's restaurant in New York. Speakers at the dinner included Gen. Adna Chaffee, soon to become Chief of Staff of the U.S. Army, and New York mayor Seth Low; letters of regret were read from President Theodore Roosevelt, Navy Secretary William Henry Moody, Secretary of State John Hay, and financier J. Pierpont Morgan.

After William Church died in 1917, the editorship was taken up for a few years by Willard Church.

1921 brought a new publisher, Franklin Coe, and a new editor, retired Brig. Gen. Henry J. Reilly. Reilly was a West Point graduate who had commanded an artillery regiment in France during World War I, and who would go on to co-found and lead the Reserve Officers Association. The name of the newspaper changed as well, achieving its all-time longest length as The American Army and Navy Journal, and Gazette of the Regular, National Guard and Reserve Forces. In 1922, a year's subscription was still $6, unchanged in more than half a century. Circulation was 20,293 and the home office was located at 20 Vesey Street in New York. That same year, the paper absorbed National Service, the official publication of the Military Training Camps Association.

Through the years, the newspaper and its parent company published several books. Perhaps the earliest was "The Eclipse of American Sea Power" by Captain Dudley W. Knox, then the newspaper's naval correspondent (1920–23) and ultimately one of the most influential historians to wear a U.S. Navy uniform. The book, Knox's first, was published in 1922 by J.J. Little & Ives Co. under the copyright of The American Army & Navy Journal Inc.

In 1924, the newspaper's name was truncated to simply The Army and Navy Journal.

==== O'Laughlin era ====
In 1925, the newspaper was purchased by John Callan O'Laughlin, a former Associated Press reporter who served during World War I as a major in the U.S. Army's Quartermaster Corps. He was an intimate of Roosevelt's, having worked as a go-between with the Russians in arranging the Russo-Japanese peaces, and later serving briefly as the president's first assistant secretary of state.

O'Laughlin installed himself as editor and publisher, and changed the newspaper's name to the Army and Navy Journal; The Gazette of the Land, Sea, and Air. Five years later, O'Laughlin appointed LeRoy Whitman as editor.

In 1933, the newspaper changed format, from a broadsheet to a smaller tabloid. Its offices were then located at 1701 Connecticut Avenue NW in Washington, D.C.

O'Laughlin wrote to Gen. Douglas MacArthur, then the Army chief of staff and acting Secretary of War, offering to have his newspaper make and award medals for the best-run camps of the Civilian Conservation Corps. MacArthur accepted the offer, writing back, "In accepting your generous offer permit me to express my appreciation of the cooperative attitude that has always characterized your contacts with the War Department."

By 1938, when the magazine celebrated its 75th anniversary, it had added a motto: "Spokesman of the Services Since 1863".

In January 1945, Time magazine decided to take the "jovial, rosy-cheeked" O'Laughlin and his newspaper down a peg. Soviet state-controlled press had recently decried the Journal's call for Moscow to establish a second front against Nazi Germany in Poland. "All this attention from Russia was due not to the Army & Navy Journal's circulation (27,568 weekly) but to its reputation as an 'unofficial but authoritative' spokesman for the U.S. Army & Navy. The Journal itself likes to foster this impression... Actually, the Journal is not in the least official. Nor is it always authoritative." O'Laughlin, the newsweekly sniffed, "still does much of its leg work. He has five assistants, only one of whom (a former chaplain) has a military background."

==== Post-O'Laughlin era ====
In March 1949, O'Laughlin died with no immediate survivors. A member of the Gridiron Club, he bequeathed the Journal to the organization, a club for journalists in Washington, D.C. News reports valued the publication, "regarded almost as an official organ of the armed forces", at $500,000 ($6.8 million today). But the bequest, made in the form of a trust to be administered by the club, created a conundrum for the social organization. As one newspaper reported, "Publishing magazines is completely out of the club's line."

On May 13, 1950, the name changed to The Army, Navy, Air Force Journal.

In March 1958, the trustees of O'Laughlin's Gridiron Club trust sold the Journal to its long-time editor, LeRoy Whitman, and its general manager, Dorothy Cone Brown.

On January 4, 1962, the publication was sold to the Military Service Publishing Company of Harrisburg, Pennsylvania.

In 1962, the Journal absorbed The Army-Navy-Air Force Register. One of the oldest military-themed publications, the Register was first published December 13, 1879, as The Army and Navy Register. On March 17, the merged publication was renamed The Army-Navy-Air Force Journal & Register.

That name lasted two years. Starting with the issue of July 8, 1964, the magazine was renamed The Journal of the Armed Forces.

In January 1965, LeRoy Whitman stepped down after 35 years as editor. His successor was Daniel Z. Henkin, who had joined the staff in 1948 as assistant editor. Henkin left after just nine months to become the director of operations for the Pentagon's press office.

From 1963 to 1967, the publisher was James A. Donovan, a retired Marine Corps colonel.

==== Schemmer era ====
By the late 1960s, the newspaper was known and read mostly for its social news of the U.S. officer corps. That changed in 1968, when it was purchased by Benjamin F. Schemmer. A 1954 graduate of West Point, Schemmer had served five years as an infantry officer, worked for Boeing until 1965, then become the director of land force weapon systems in the Office of the Secretary of Defense (Systems Analysis). On July 6, 1968, Schemmer renamed the publication Armed Forces Journal and turned it into a weekly magazine with a new focus: in-depth analytical coverage of defense issues. It also received a new subhead: "Defense Weekly" replaced "Spokesman of the Services Since 1863". In August 1971, the weekly became a monthly. In February 1974, Schemmer added a word to the title, dubbing the publication Armed Forces Journal International.

LuAnne K. Levens, Schemmer's second wife, became publisher in 1977.

Noted defense expert Anthony Cordesman served as AFJ's international editor until about April 1984.

In March 1988, Schemmer and Levens sold AFJI to Pergamon-Brassey's Defense Publishers of Greenwich, Connecticut, a U.S. subsidiary of Britain's Maxwell Communications. Various newspapers reported the magazine's circulation at that time as about 42,500 or 45,000, with about half paid and half sent free to key leaders. "The publication covers the international defense arena, weapons and research, electronics, the Soviet military and military issues in Congress, the Pentagon and the White House," The Washington Post said. Schemmer, who stayed on as editor, said the larger company had first approached him about five years previously, and that he and Levens had finally sold because they believed Maxwell offered "enormous possibilities for international expansion."

Schemmer resigned in 1992, citing health reasons.

Next to occupy the editor's chair was John Roos, a retired major with 21 years of service in the U.S. Army.

In 1993, the magazine was purchased by Donald Fruehling, who had run the U.S. division of Maxwell Communications when it acquired AFJI, and his wife Gudrun. Maxwell Communications had gone bankrupt and was broken up.

=== 2000s ===
==== Gannett era ====
In September 2002, Armed Forces Journal International Publishing Co. was purchased by Army Times Publishing Company, a division of Gannett. An Associated Press report described AFJ as a magazine that "gives military officers analysis, insight and commentary on the latest technological and strategic developments."

In November 2005, Thomas Donnelly became editor.

Eleven months later, Karen Walker, formerly managing editor, replaced Donnelly as editor. In April 2007, AFJ published "A Failure in Generalship" by Army Col. Paul Yingling. The Washington Post described it as "a blistering attack on U.S. generals" and a signal of the "public emergence of a split inside the military between younger, mid-career officers and the top brass". In the article, Yingling argues that the U.S. general corps needs to be overhauled because it failed to anticipate the post-invasion insurgency in Iraq, and because of its reluctance to admit the onset of such an insurgency in 2004. The article drew national media coverage and would go on to be widely cited in military and academic writing. Journalist Peter Maass called Yingling "perhaps the most respected military dissenter of his generation".

In 2011, Bradley Peniston took over as editor. The following year, the publication was named one of the country's top-10 magazines with under $2 million in annual revenue by the American Society of Business Publication Editors. In February 2012, it published "Truth, Lies, and Afghanistan: How Military Leaders Have Let Us Down” by Army Lt. Col. Daniel L. Davis. One of the first public criticisms of the War in Afghanistan by a serving military officer, the article drew national press coverage, including by the New York Times, Time, and NPR; and was praised by several U.S. lawmakers. The following year, Davis received the Ridenhour Prize for Truth-Telling.

In 2013, Armed Forces Journal marked its 150th birthday. It also announced plans to cease print publication and become an online-only title.

AFJ last published on April 29, 2014, under publisher Elaine Donnelly. The website disappeared in mid-2015 but was restored, without update, in January 2016.

==== Post-Gannett ====
In 2015, Gannett spun off AFJ and the other former Army Times Publishing Company publications to Tegna. In March 2016, Tegna sold the renamed Sightline Media Group to Regent, a Los Angeles-based private equity firm controlled by investor Michael Reinstein.
