= Robert Bacon =

American diplomat (1860–1919)

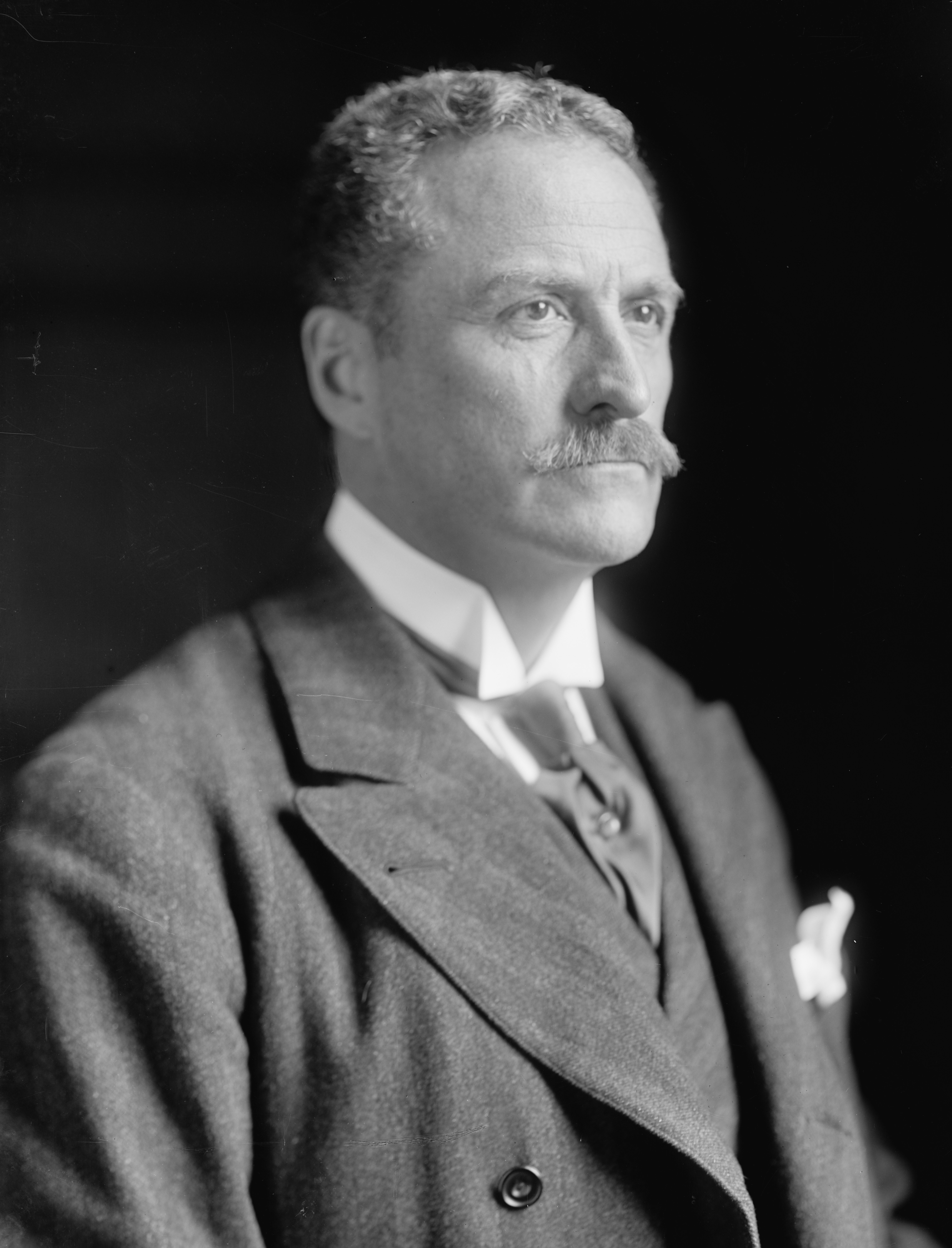
- Portrait by Harris & Ewing, c. 1905–1919

United States Ambassador to France
- In office December 31, 1909 – April 19, 1912
- President: William Howard Taft
- Preceded by: Henry White
- Succeeded by: Myron T. Herrick

39th United States Secretary of State
- In office January 27, 1909 – March 5, 1909
- President: Theodore Roosevelt; William Howard Taft
- Preceded by: Elihu Root
- Succeeded by: Philander C. Knox

26th United States Assistant Secretary of State
- In office October 11, 1905 – January 27, 1909
- President: Theodore Roosevelt
- Preceded by: Francis B. Loomis
- Succeeded by: John Callan O'Laughlin

Personal details
- Born: July 5, 1860 Jamaica Plain, Massachusetts, U.S. (now part of Boston)
- Died: May 29, 1919 (aged 58) New York City, U.S.
- Party: Republican
- Spouse: Martha Waldron Cowdin
- Children: 4, including Robert, Gaspar
- Education: Harvard University (BA)

Military service
- Allegiance: United States
- Branch/service: United States Army
- Years of service: 1917–1919
- Rank: Lieutenant colonel

Robert Bacon (July 5, 1860 – May 29, 1919) was an American athlete, banker, businessman, statesman, diplomat and Republican Party politician who served as the 39th United States Secretary of State in the Theodore Roosevelt administration from January to March 1909. He also served as Assistant Secretary of State from 1905 to 1909 and Ambassador to France from 1909 to 1912.

Bacon was a native of Boston, Massachusetts and attended Harvard College. While a student at Harvard, he starred in athletics, captaining the football team, rowing crew, and winning events in boxing and track. He befriended future president Theodore Roosevelt, leading to a lifelong friendship and professional relationship. After graduation, he became an investment banker with the firm of Lee, Higginson & Co. before joining J.P. Morgan & Co. in New York.

As Secretary of State, Bacon pressed Roosevelt's interests in the United States Senate to ratify treaties with Colombia and the new nation of Panama to resolve disputes over the Panama Canal. He continued to advance United States interests in Latin America after leaving office, conducting a tour of the region for the Carnegie Endowment for International Peace and publishing a treatise arguing for better relations with South America.

Bacon was a leader in the movement for military preparedness following the outbreak of the First World War, establishing training programs for potential soldiers and officers prior to American entry to the war. In 1916, he narrowly lost the Republican primary for United States Senator from New York to William M. Calder. He was commissioned as a major in the United States Army in 1917 and served under General John Pershing in France. Pershing appointed Bacon to a major role as the chief American liaison to British General Headquarters. Bacon returned to the United States following the war but died from complications following surgery less than two months after his arrival in New York City.

== Early life and family ==
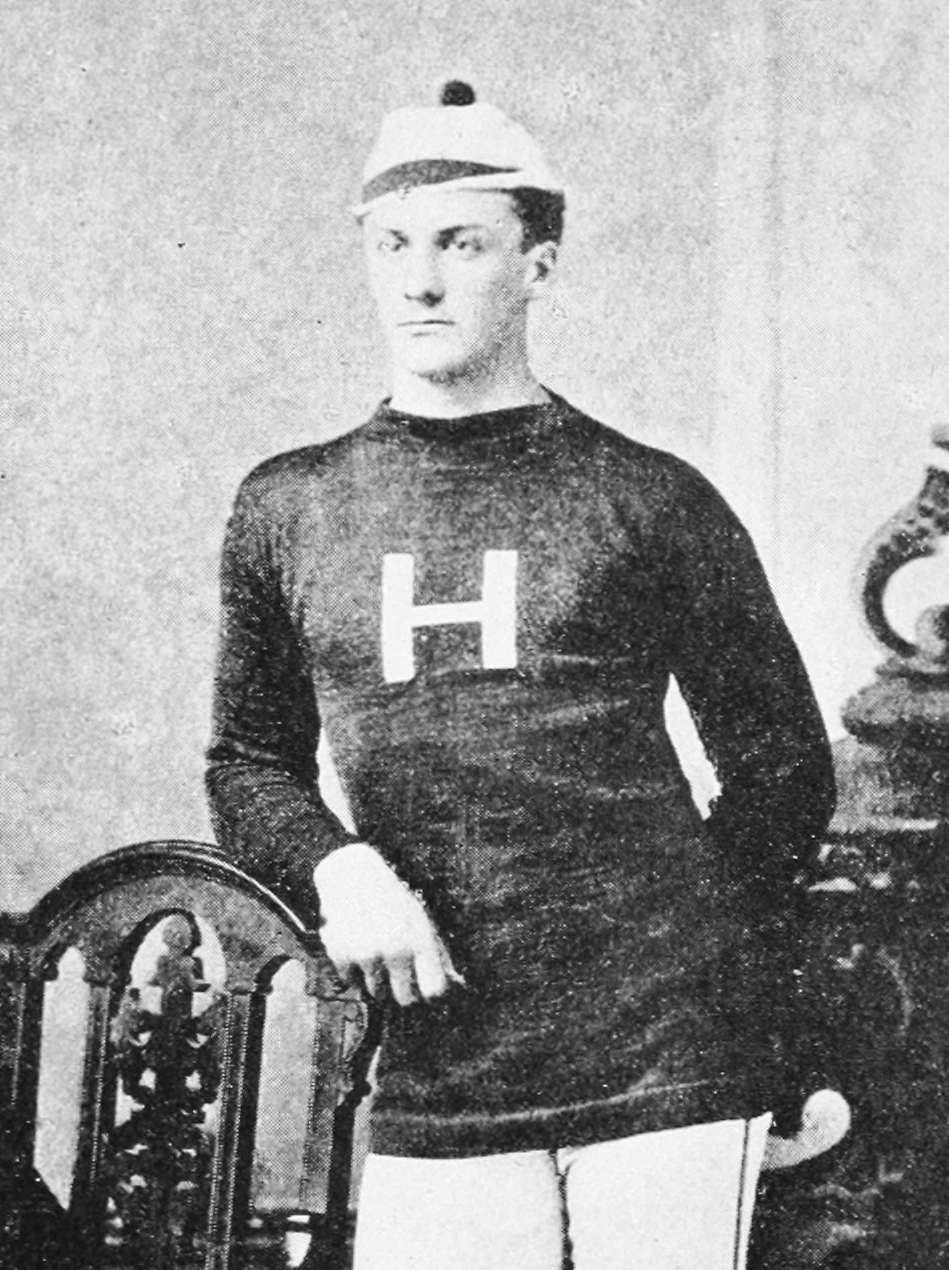
Bacon excelled as an undergraduate athlete at Harvard College.

Robert Bacon was born on July 5, 1860, in Jamaica Plain, Massachusetts, and raised in the Beacon Hill neighborhood of Boston. His father, William Benjamin Bacon, was a Boston merchant who founded Daniel G. Bacon & Company with his elder brother and served as the Boston agent for Baring Brothers. The Bacon family had early colonial roots and settled in the town of Barnstable on Cape Cod. His mother, Emily Crosby Low, was ill for most of his childhood and died when he was eleven years old.

After attending the Hopkinson School in Boston, Bacon was enrolled at Harvard College in 1876, shortly after his sixteenth birthday. At Harvard, he was a star athlete and popular classmate, captaining the football team and freshman baseball team, rowing seven in the crew, winning a heavyweight boxing championship, and winning both the quarter-mile and hundred-yard dash. He was also president of the glee club, chief marshal of his class day celebration, and a member of the A.D. Club and Delta Kappa Epsilon. He graduated as the youngest member of the class of 1880, which included future President Theodore Roosevelt and was called "Bacon's class." Roosevelt and Bacon were close friends and sparring partners during their time at Harvard. Following graduation, he completed a tour of the world, traveling west through Japan, China, India, and the Mediterranean.

== Business career (1881–1905) ==
=== Early career ===
Bacon began his career at the investment bank of Lee, Higginson & Company in Boston; Henry Lee Higginson was a family friend and neighbor on Beacon Hill. In 1883, he accepted an offer to join the firm of E. Rollins Morse, where he handled some of the Boston business of J. P., Morgan.

=== J.P. Morgan & Company (1894–1903) ===
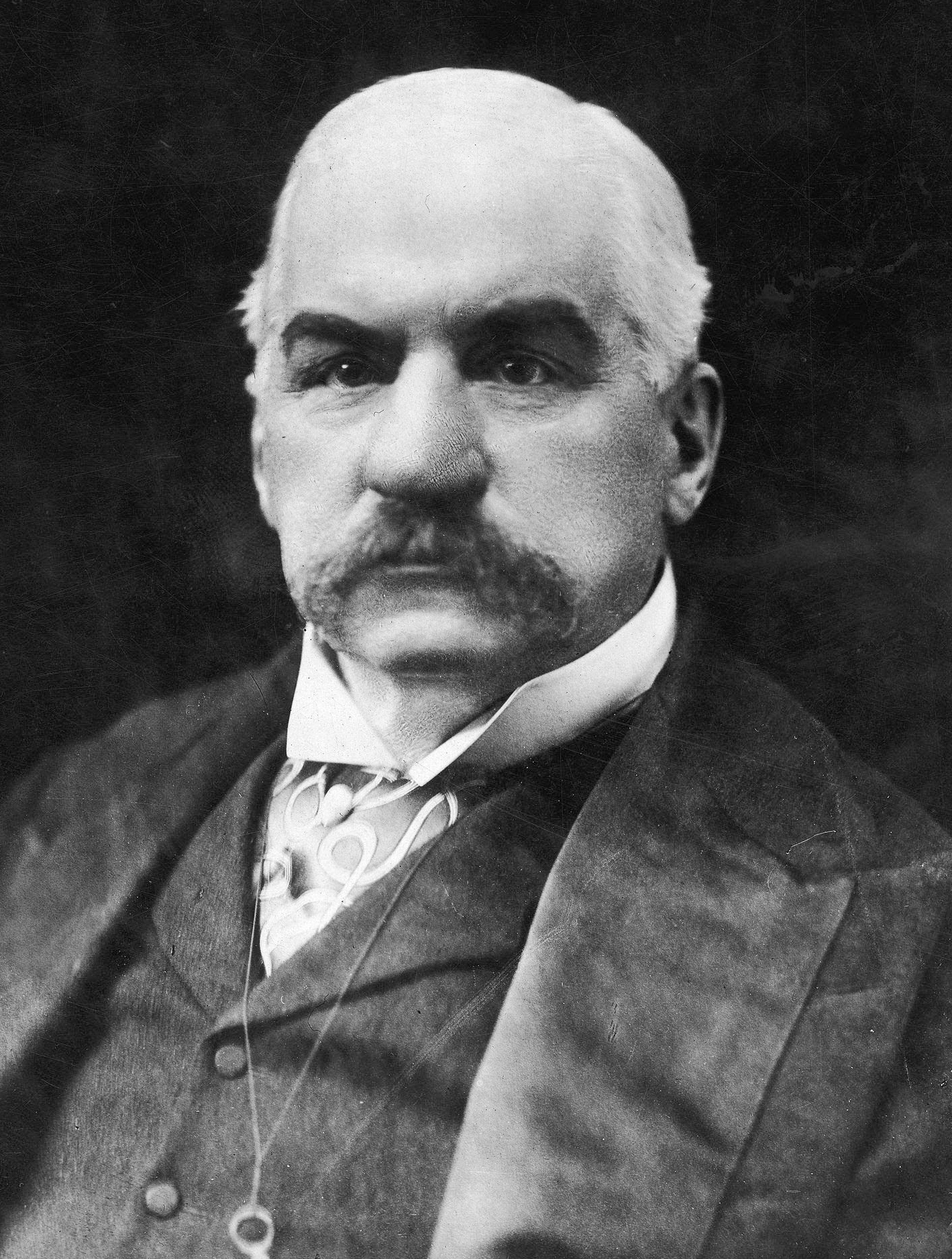
From 1894 to 1903, Bacon was a trusted lieutenant of banking magnate J. P. Morgan.

In 1894, Bacon accepted an offer to become a partner in J.P. Morgan & Co. in New York City, cancelling plans to relocate to France for his children's education. He would remain with the firm until his resignation in 1903. As a junior partner to J. P. Morgan, he was one of the most trusted lieutenants in the firm and often led the American business while Morgan was in Europe.

==== Panic of 1893 ====
Bacon referred to his early months at J.P. Morgan as "really working for perhaps the first time in my life," as the firm was engaged in Morgan's plan to restore the credit of the United States government following the Panic of 1893.

On February 5, 1895, he and Morgan met with President Grover Cleveland at the White House, where Morgan urged the private sale of government bonds in exchange for gold to an international syndicate represented by J.P. Morgan & Co. At the time, the United States Treasury was the subject of a bank run and on the verge of exhausting its gold reserves. Morgan prevailed upon Cleveland to agree to the private placement, in which Morgan's bank would act as representative of an international syndicate to supply sufficient gold. Although Congress failed to pass a bill explicitly granting Cleveland the authority to make such a sale, he finalized the agreement with Morgan on February 8, avoiding the suspension of payments.

The deal was politically controversial for all involved, but Bacon's role in managing the transaction earned him appreciation from Morgan; in the future, Bacon would manage all of Morgan's American business while the latter was in Europe.

==== United States Steel Corporation ====
In 1898, Bacon took on the firm's work for the newly formed Federal Steel Corporation, a steel conglomerate with over $100 million (approximately $3,209,207,161.13 in 2024) in capital. Elbert Henry Gary, a Chicago lawyer who served as president of Federal Steel, hired Morgan to finance further acquisitions by the firm, with a particular interest in the holdings of Andrew Carnegie. Negotiations between Morgan and Charles M. Schwab, the president of Carnegie Steel, began December 12, 1898, and concluded in 1901 for $487 million, an unheard-of sum for the time. The sale of the Carnegie interests resulted in the consolidation of the new United States Steel Corporation, valued at over 1.38 billion dollars and controlling two-thirds of the American steel industry.

==== Northern Securities Company ====
In 1901, Bacon oversaw the consolidation of Morgan's vast railroad interests with those of James J. Hill in the Great Northern Railway and their joint acquisition of the Chicago, Burlington & Quincy Railroad. The latter acquisition was opposed by E. H. Harriman of the Union Pacific Railroad; Harriman demanded a one-third interest in the acquisition and when refused, attempted (with Jacob Schiff of Kuhn, Loeb & Co.) a hostile takeover of Morgan's Northern Pacific Railway; Bacon led the takeover defense. The resulting inflation in the price of Northern Pacific stock, which rose rapidly to over $1,000 per share of common stock in May 1901, threatened to crash the New York Stock Exchange. The ensuing financial panic led to the ruin of many small investors.

To resolve the takeover bid and complete the planned consolidation of the Morgan and Hill railways, an investment company named the Northern Securities Company was formed on November 13, and stock in the three railroads (the Great Northern, the Northern Pacific, and the Chicago, Burlington & Quincy) in exchange for new issues of its equity. Harriman was named to the board of directors of the Northern Pacific and the Burlington, ending the takeover bid and calming the markets.

However, an antitrust suit was immediately brought by the United States in the United States District Court for the District of Minnesota against the Northern Securities Company under the Sherman Antitrust Act. Bacon was named as a defendant in the suit, which challenged the right of Northern Securities to own stock in the Northern Pacific and Great Northern. The case was decided against the company (including Bacon), and the judgment was affirmed by the Supreme Court of the United States by a 5–4 vote, dissolving the Northern Securities Company and returning the railroad stock to its owners. As a result of the stress from the Northern Securities case, Bacon took a one-year leave of absence in 1903 before retiring from J. P. Morgan.

== Diplomatic career (1905–1912) ==
=== Assistant Secretary of State (1905–09) ===
On September 5, 1905, Bacon accepted an appointment from President Theodore Roosevelt, his former Harvard classmate, to serve as United States Assistant Secretary of State. The appointment had been requested by the new Secretary of State, Elihu Root.

As Assistant Secretary, Bacon's work focused on relations with Canada and Latin America and advancing Roosevelt's Pan-American policy. He was sent to negotiate the arbitration of the Newfoundland fisheries dispute by the Hague with James Bryce; following Bacon's death, Bryce remarked, "How often have I recalled the work we did together for furthering friendship and good relations between America and England, and how pleasant it was to deal with him." From July 4 through September 30, 1906, Bacon served as acting Secretary of State while Root was in Rio de Janeiro to attend the Pan-American Conference. During his time as acting secretary, Bacon advised Roosevelt on the outbreak of hostilities between Guatemala, El Salvador and Honduras, cautioning against unilateral intervention in favor of a bilateral intervention with Mexico. An armistice was quickly declared with joint American and Mexican oversight. He also successfully negotiated the basis of a settlement of debt owed by the Dominican Republic and the return of land in Puerto Rico to the Catholic Church.

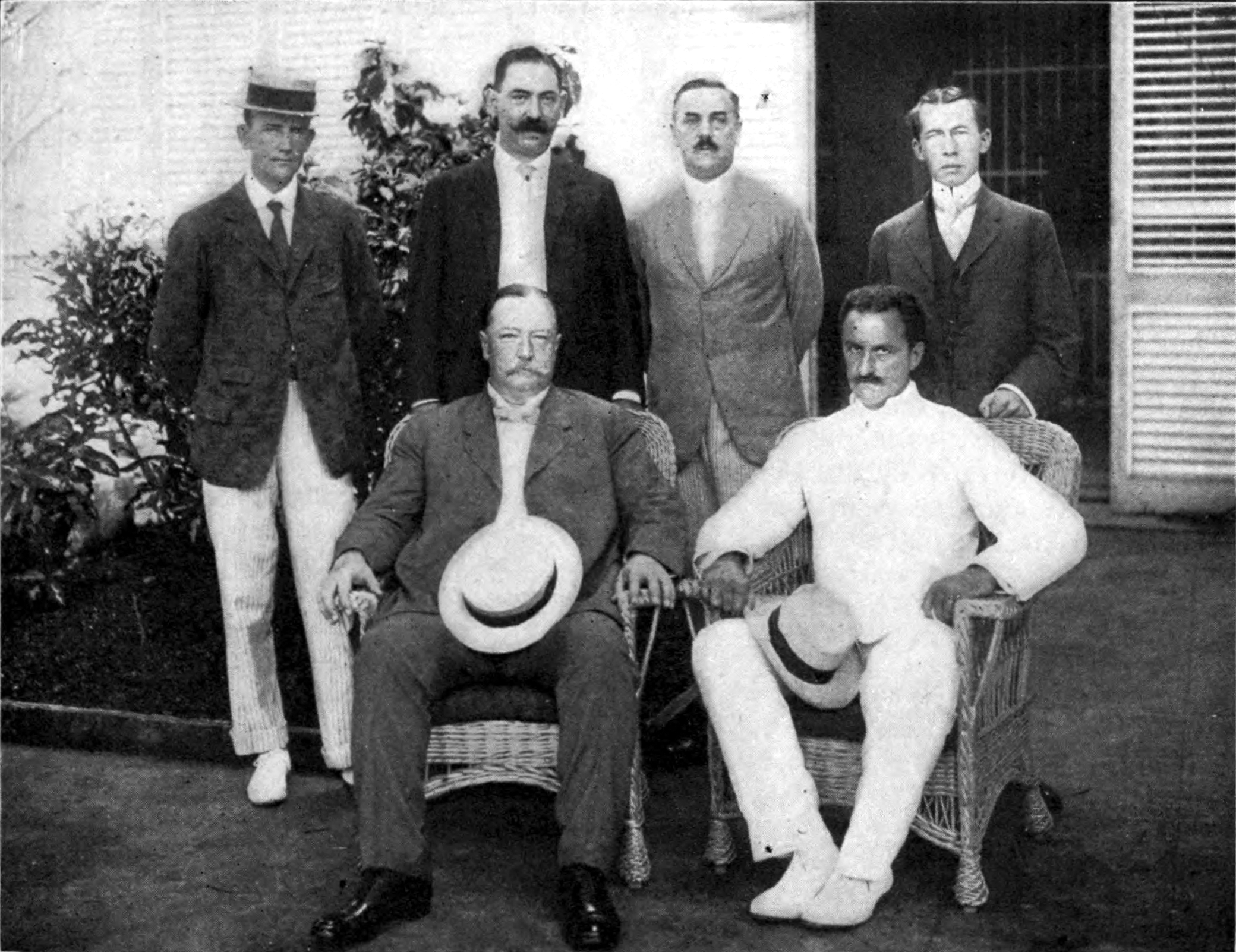
In 1906, Bacon (seated right) negotiated the establishment of a provisional American government in Cuba with William Howard Taft (seated left).

==== Provisional Government of Cuba ====
The most pressing matter during Bacon's tenure as acting secretary was a rebellion leading to the collapse of the Republic of Cuba, an independent state established by the United States following a period of American military government. In response to appeals by President Tomás Estrada Palma, Bacon and Secretary of War William Howard Taft personally departed Washington on September 16 for a mission to Cuba, in order to negotiate peace with the rebels against Palma's government. Despite the American mission, no peace was reached; Taft accordingly issued a proclamation on September 29, 1906, establishing the Provisional Government of Cuba by the United States and proclaiming himself Provisional Governor. Taft and Bacon remained in Cuba until October 15, when administration of the island was handed to Charles Edward Magoon.

Though Bacon had been involved in deliberations over the Provisional Government, he privately expressed reservations over Taft's policy, which he believed was contrary to Root's foreign policy and to Root's earlier policy as Secretary of War, including the organization of the government and drafting of the new Cuban constitution.

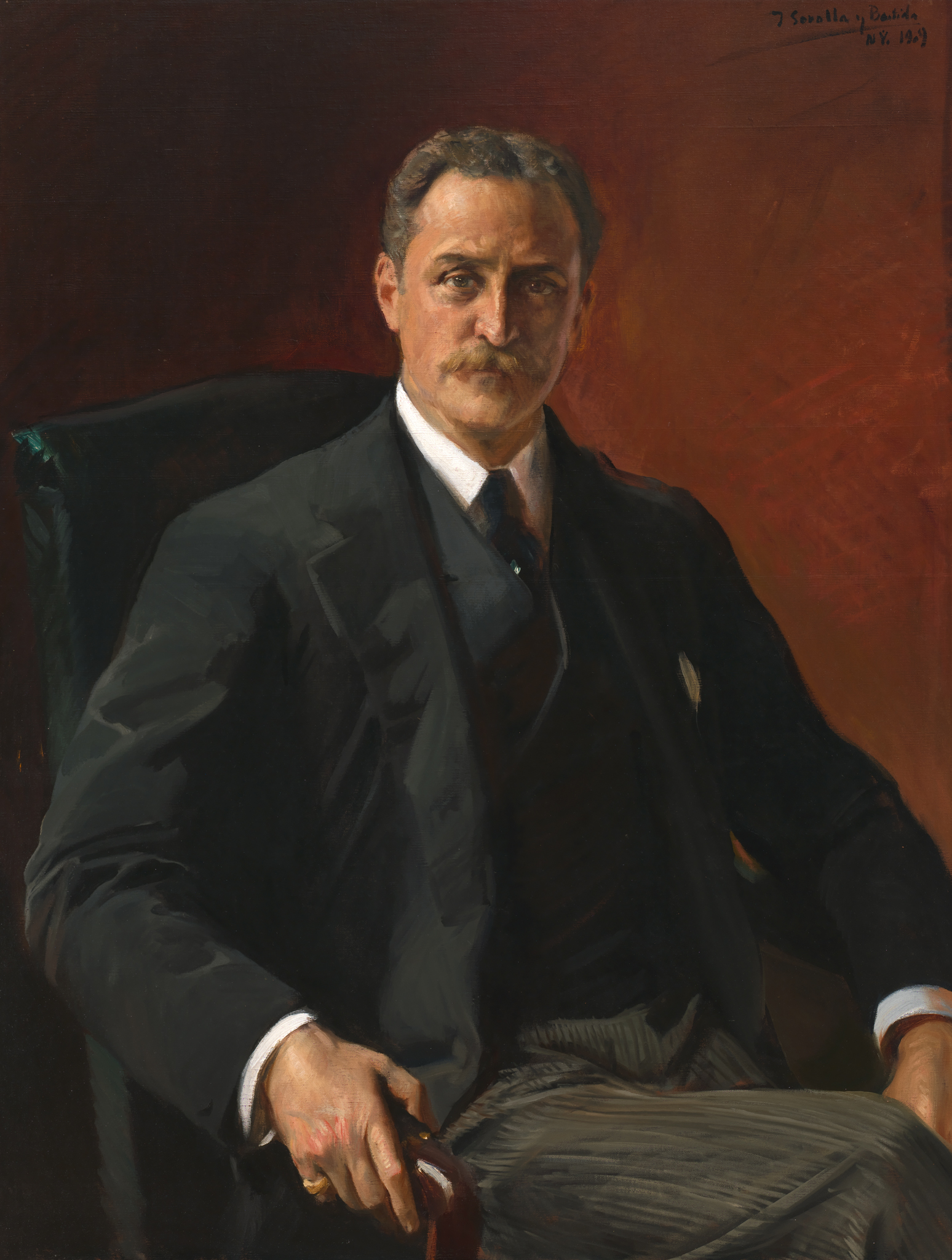
Robert Bacon, Official State Department Portrait by Joaquín Sorolla, 1909.

=== Secretary of State (1909) ===
In January 1909, Elihu Root was elected to represent New York in the U.S. Senate, and Bacon was nominated to succeed him as Secretary of State on January 25. He was confirmed by the Senate and sworn into office on January 27, thirty-eight days before the end of Roosevelt's term in office and the inauguration of William Howard Taft as president. Taft appointed Philander C. Knox to succeed him as secretary.

Less than three weeks before Bacon's nomination, the United States had entered into treaties with Colombia and Panama to settle disputes relating to the separation of Panama. The Colombian treaty was approved by the Senate on February 24. Bacon spent much of his term as secretary urging the approval of the Panama treaty, which was finally approved on March 3, the day before Roosevelt's term in office expired. However, the treaties were rejected in Colombia, where their introduction despite widespread anti-American sentiment led to a revolution and the resignation of President Rafael Reyes.

Bacon directed American participation in the London Naval Conference through February 1909, where American delegates proposed to invest a new International Prize Court with permanent jurisdiction as a court of international justice. Great Britain joined the United States in urging this proposal; however, the Conference rejected the proposal for enlarged jurisdiction, and the London Declaration was never ratified by any of its signatories. In February, Bacon also personally served as a delegate to the North American Conservation Conference with Canada and Mexico, where the attendees resolved to establish a global conference for the conservation of natural resources.

=== Ambassador to France (1909–12) ===
Bacon served as United States Ambassador to France under President Taft from 1909 until 1912. Historian James Brown Scott remarked, "There was nothing eventful in Mr. Bacon's ambassadorship."

Upon his arrival, Bacon focused on securing relief aid for the Great Flood of Paris. In April 1910, he hosted Theodore Roosevelt on the latter's return from an African safari. During the visit, Roosevelt delivered his famous Citizenship in a Republic speech at the Sorbonne. He continued to develop ties to Latin American colleagues in France, hosting an annual celebration for these countries on George Washington's birthday, at which he emphasized the similarities between Washington, Simón Bolívar and José de San Martín.

Bacon submitted his resignation as Ambassador on January 2, 1912, upon his election as a Fellow of Harvard University. He remained in office until Myron Herrick was nominated as his successor. Bacon and his family remained in Paris to brief Herrick on the diplomatic situation, causing them to cancel their planned trip on the RMS Titanic.

== World War I ==
In August 1914, after the outbreak of World War I in Europe, Bacon went to France to help with the work of the American Field Service – which provided ambulances and drivers to support French and British forces. He was also attached to the British Royal Army Medical Corps (RAMC) and assisted with the establishment of a typhoid hospital near Ypres. His book For Better Relations with Our Latin American Neighbors was published in 1915.

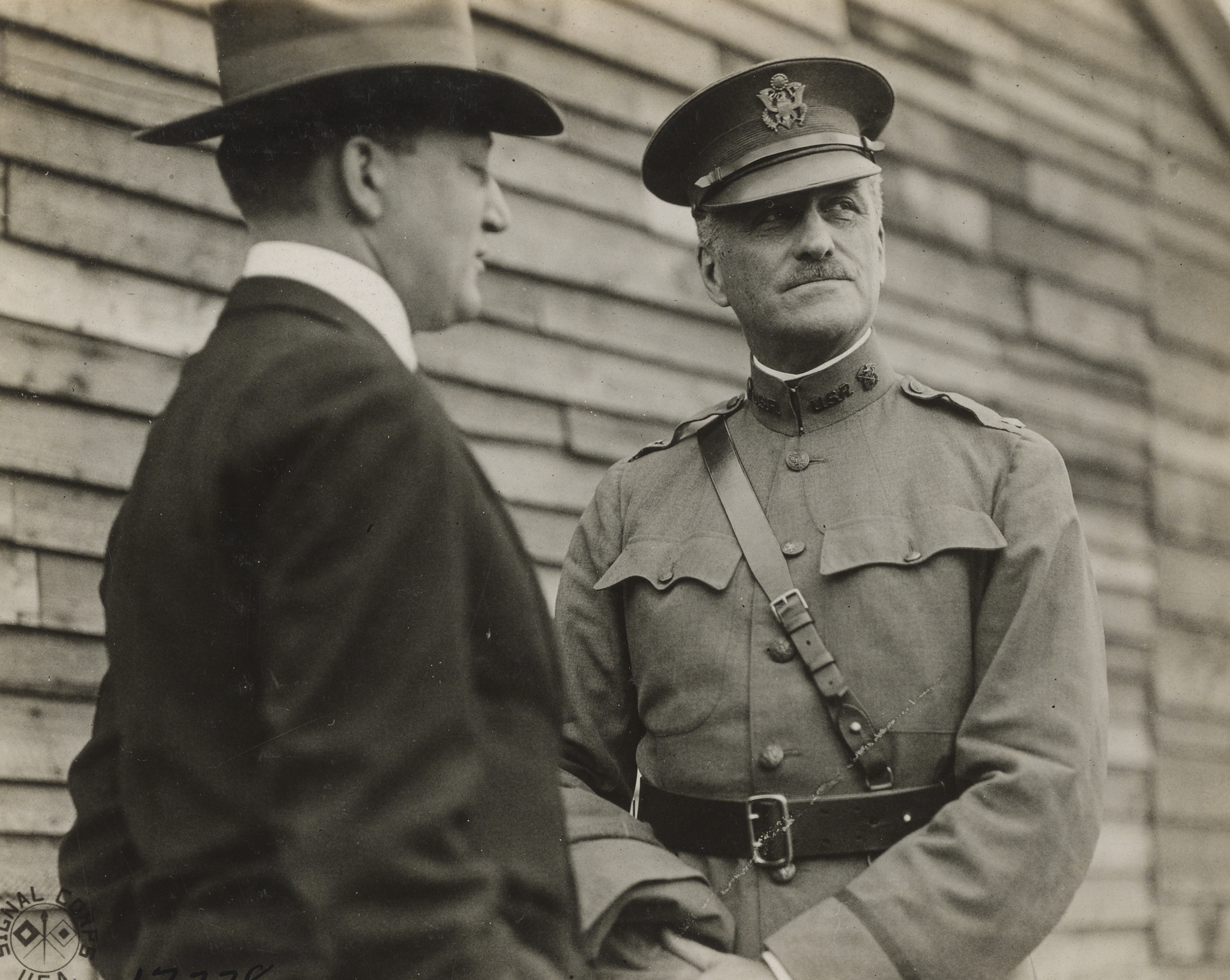
Bacon (right) served as the American liaison to Field Marshal Douglas Haig during World War I.

He was a staunch advocate of the United States' entry into World War I and spoke in favor of increased military preparedness via universal military service as the president of the National Security League in 1916. He criticized President Woodrow Wilson for inaction at the German invasion of Belgium and sought the Republican nomination for U.S. Senate against William M. Calder. Bacon continued to push for a stronger national defense as well as a protective tariff that could be used for the mobilization of industry in case of war. Although he had support from former president Theodore Roosevelt and Elihu Root, Bacon lost the race by about 9,000 votes and pledged to support Calder. He was named as the candidate of the American Party but withdrew on account of his pledge to Calder.

He was then commissioned as a major in the United States Army in May 1917, one month after the American entry into World War I, before sailing to France as a member of the staff of Major General John J. "Blackjack" Pershing, who was made commander of the American Expeditionary Forces (AEF). Bacon was promoted to lieutenant colonel in 1918 and served as chief of the American military mission at British General Headquarters working with the British commander, Field Marshal Sir Douglas Haig, commanding the British Expeditionary Force (BEF) on the Western Front. He returned to the United States in April 1919, five months after the war ended due to the Armistice with Germany on November 11, 1918.

== Personal life, death and legacy ==
Bacon married Martha Waldron Cowdin on October 10, 1883. They had four children:

- Robert Low Bacon, a United States Representative from New York;
- Gaspar Griswold Bacon, President of the Massachusetts Senate (1929–32) and Lieutenant Governor of Massachusetts (1933–35);
- Elliot Cowdin Bacon; and
- Martha Beatrix Bacon (1890–1967) who married George Whitney (1885–1963).

Bacon died at the New York Eye and Ear Infirmary on May 29, 1919, from blood poisoning after undergoing surgery on his mastoiditis.

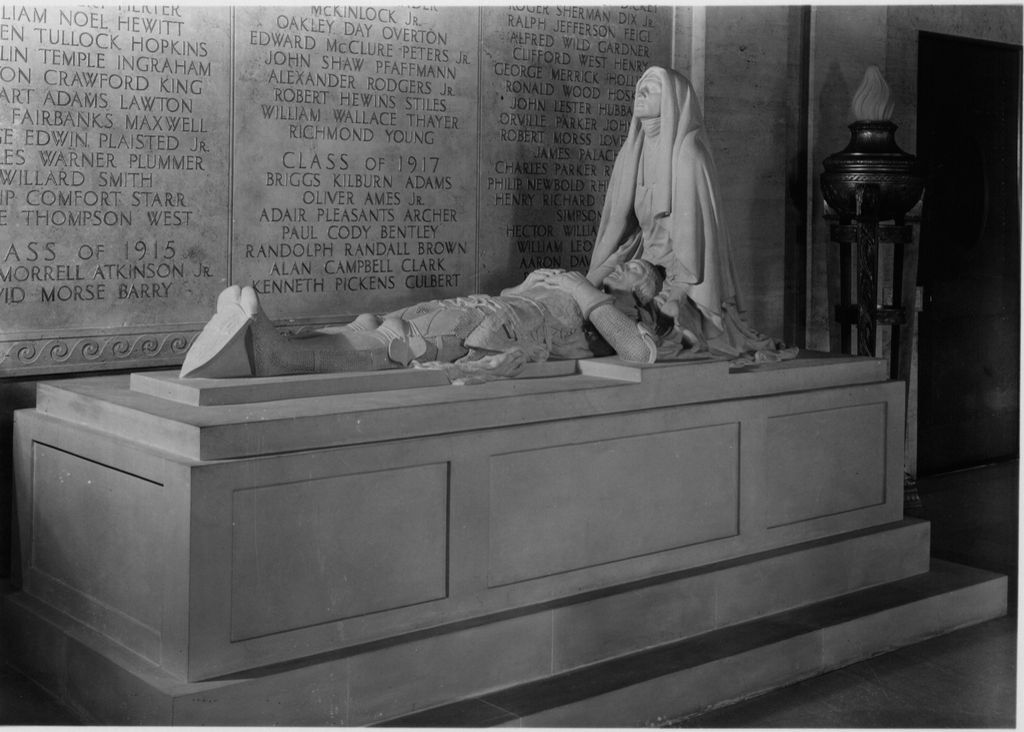
Malvina Hoffman, The Sacrifice, caen marble sculpture, 1922, Modern and Contemporary Art Museum, Harvard University

A sculpture entitled The Sacrifice was made by Malvina Hoffman as a memorial to the Bacon and alumni of Harvard University who lost their lives during World War I. In it, the head of a 13th-century crusader lay on the lap of a draped woman. The sculpture was dedicated in 1923 at the Cathedral of St. John the Divine in New York. After the War Memorial Chapel at Harvard was completed in 1932, it was installed there.

Political offices
Preceded by Elihu Root	U.S. Secretary of State; Served under: Theodore Roosevelt; January 27, 1909 – March 5, 1909	Succeeded by Philander C. Knox
Preceded by Francis B. Loomis	United States Assistant Secretary of State; September 5, 1905 – January 27, 1909	Succeeded by John Callan O'Laughlin
Diplomatic posts
Preceded by Henry White	United States Ambassador to France; 1909–1912	Succeeded by Myron T. Herrick
