= American Institute for Economic Research =

Free-market think tank

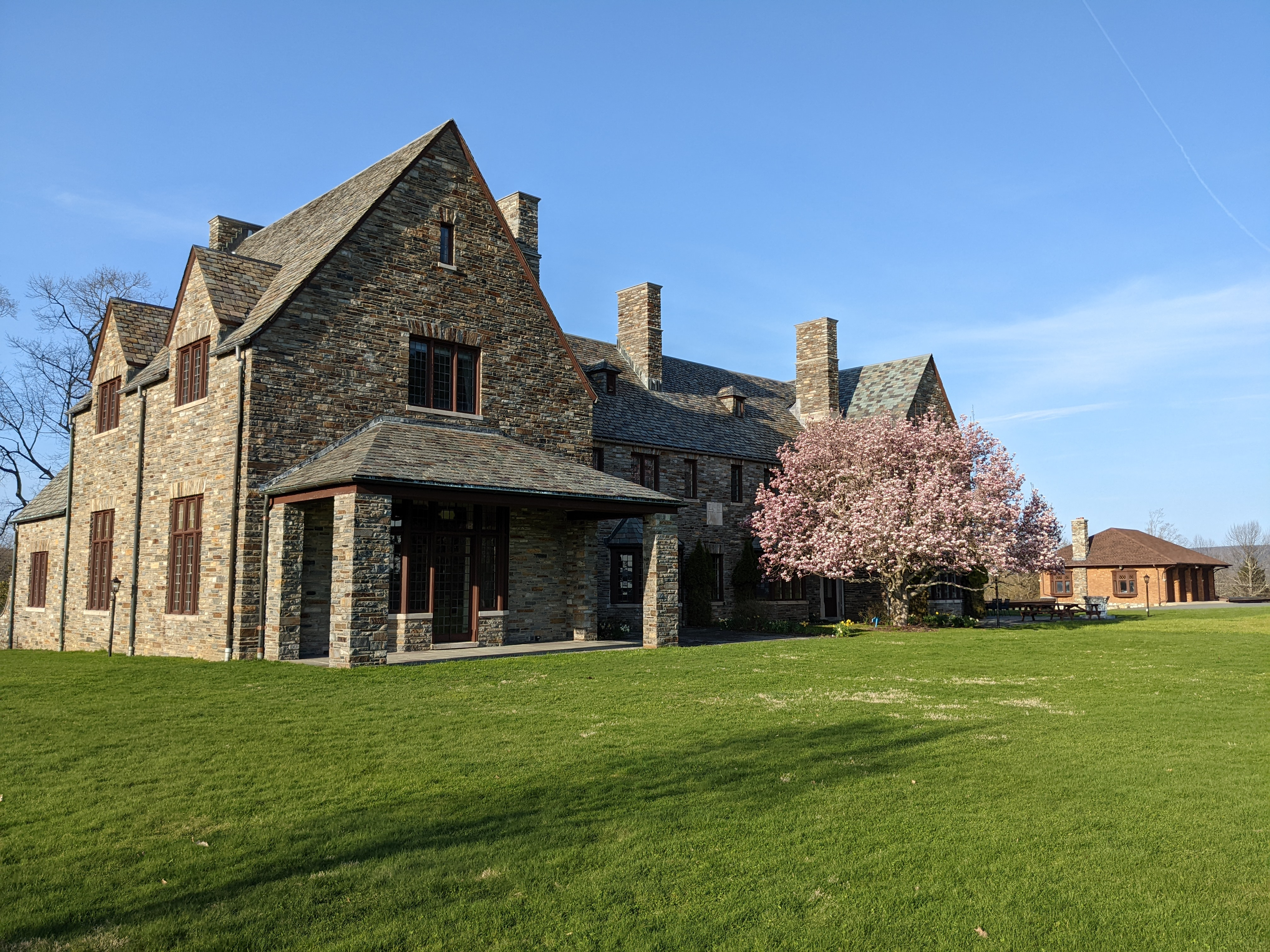
- AIER's Historic Cotswold Cottage
- Abbreviation: AIER
- Formation: 1933; 93 years ago
- Founder: Edward C. Harwood
- Type: 501(c)(3) non-profit think tank
- Tax ID no.: 04-2121305
- Location: Great Barrington, Massachusetts
- President: Samuel Gregg
- Revenue: $4,820,000 (2023)
- Expenses: $9,250,000 (2023)
- Endowment: $194,000,000 in assets (2023)
- Website: aier.org

The American Institute for Economic Research (AIER) is a free-market, libertarian think tank located in Great Barrington, Massachusetts known for spreading climate and health misinformation. It was founded in 1933 by Edward C. Harwood, an economist and investment advisor, and is a 501(c)(3) nonprofit. From January 2022 to April 2025, its president was William P. Ruger, who resigned to serve as Deputy Director of National Intelligence for Mission Integration under president Donald Trump. Ruger was succeeded by Samuel Gregg in 2025.

AIER maintains a global network of local chapters called Harwood Salons (previously called the Bastiat Society). AIER owns American Investment Services Inc., an investment advisory firm whose fund was valued at around $285 million in 2020.

AIER has a history of promoting climate change denial. During the COVID-19 pandemic, AIER promoted a herd immunity strategy in the Great Barrington Declaration, which was condemned by health organizations but influenced some policies of Trump and British Prime Minister Boris Johnson.

== History ==
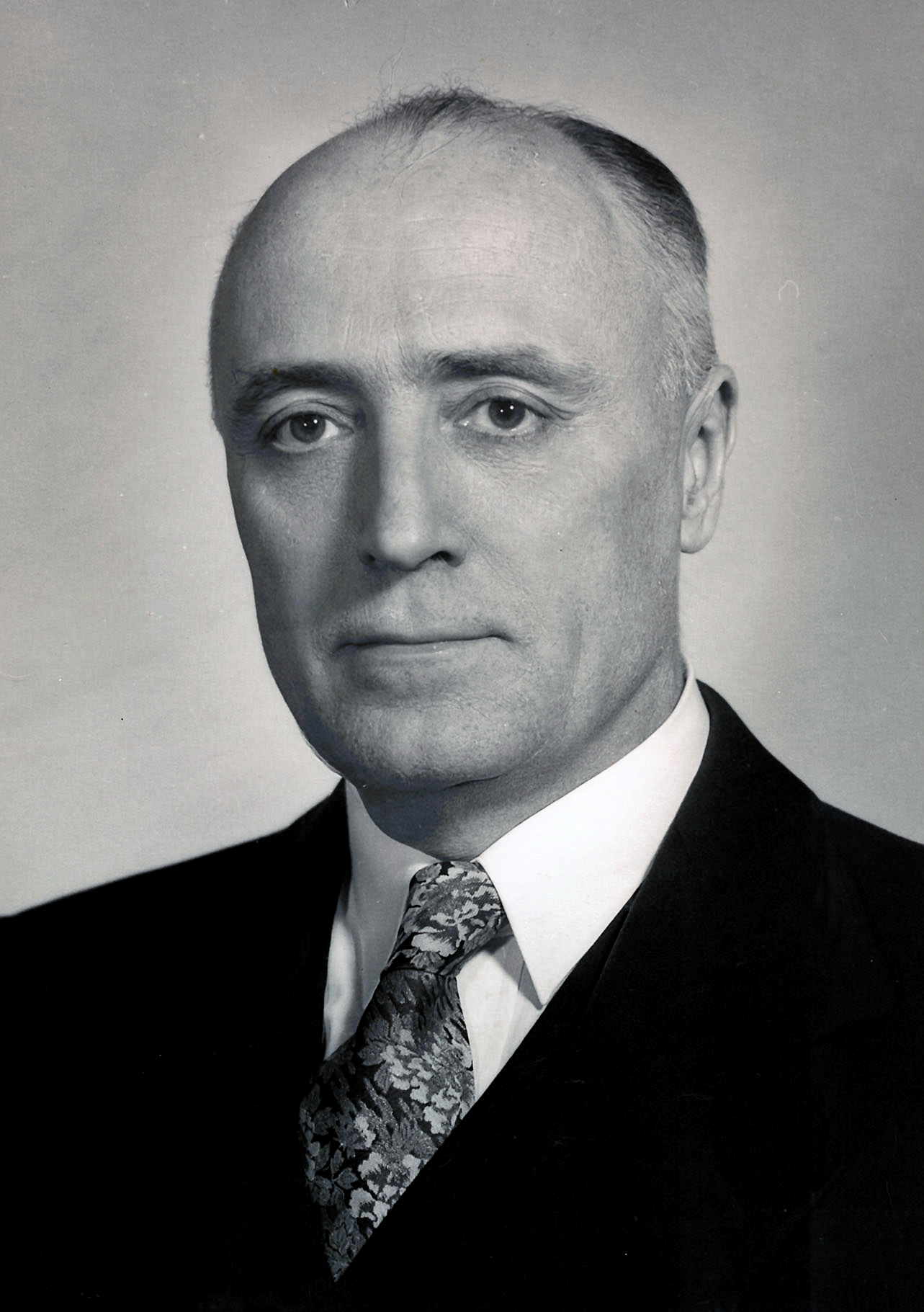
Edward C. Harwood

Col. Edward C. Harwood was a graduate of the United States Military Academy and served in the Army Corps of Engineers. In the 1920s, he began writing freelance magazine articles on economic issues. With $200 (equivalent to $4,974 in 2025) saved from selling his articles, Harwood founded AIER in 1933. According to The Berkshire Edge, this makes AIER the "oldest economic research institute in the United States".

Edward Stringham was appointed President of the Institute in 2017; he was preceded by Stephen Adams, Will Ruger became president in 2022, and then Samuel Gregg took over the position in 2025.

In 2019, the Museum of American Finance loaned its entire library collection to AIER, to be hosted, catalogued and made available there. The initial loan period was for five years.

== Policy positions ==
AIER's stated mission is to "[educate] people on the value of personal freedom, free enterprise, property rights, limited government, and sound money." It takes positions on specific policies such as free trade, deregulation, and the defense of certain civil liberties.

The organization has a history of promoting climate change denial, with articles such as "Brazilians Should Keep Slashing Their Rainforest." The institution has also funded research on the comparative benefits that sweatshops supplying multinationals bring to the people working in them.

According to historian and philosopher Philip Mirowski, AIER has been "leading the charge" to neutralize the Centers for Disease Control and Prevention as "arbiters of public health" and favors abolishing other federal bureaucracies, such as the Federal Reserve and the Consumer Financial Protection Bureau.

=== COVID-19 pandemic ===
During the COVID-19 pandemic, AIER spread COVID-19 misinformation, promoting a fringe strategy of herd immunity strategy of "focused protection" to deal with the pandemic. AIER issued a statement in October 2020 called the Great Barrington Declaration, which argued for sole reliance on this strategy, while saying that society otherwise should take no steps to prevent infection. It was condemned by public health organizations and experts. Anthony Fauci, the infectious disease expert appointed by the White House, called it "total nonsense" and unscientific. Tyler Cowen, a libertarian economist at George Mason University, wrote that while he sympathized with a libertarian approach to deal with the pandemic, he considered the declaration to be dangerous and misguided. Commentary published by the Niskanen Center called the declaration propaganda.

The declaration and its signatories, publicized by AIER's offshoot the Brownstone Institute, influenced some policies of U.S. President Donald Trump and British Prime Minister Boris Johnson. AIER paid for ads on Facebook promoting its articles against government social distancing measures and mask mandates.

== Programs and affiliations ==
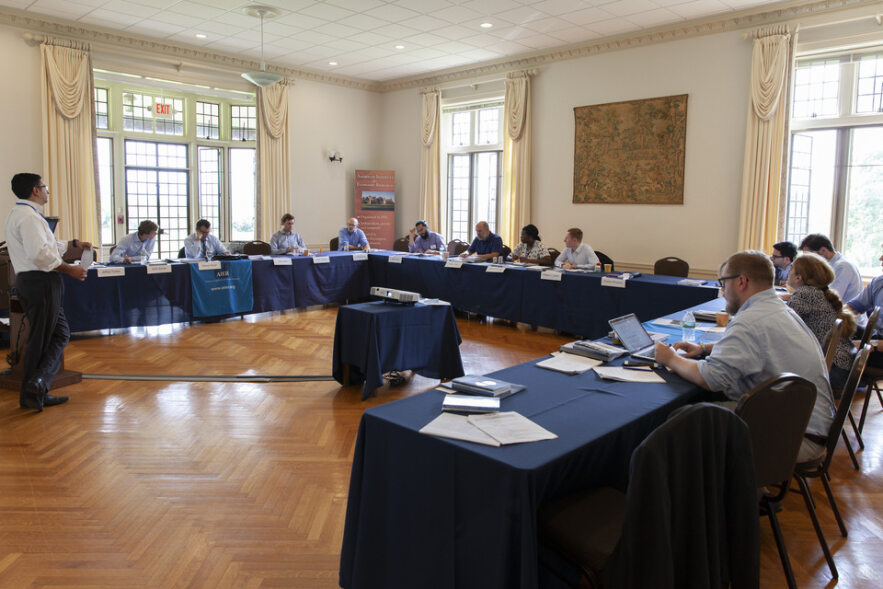
2018 Sound Money Seminar

AIER maintains a global network of local chapters called Harwood Salons (previously called the Bastiat Society). It partners for events, initiatives, and other programming with the Atlas Network and other groups such as the Free to Choose Network, Young Voices, and several university centers across the country.

Since 1999, it publishes The Daily Economy online.

== Funding ==
AIER owns American Investment Services Inc., an investment advisory firm whose fund was valued at around $285 million in 2020 (equivalent to $354,555,098 in 2025). Over half of AIER's funding comes from its investments, but it also receives contributions and foundation grants. In 2018 it reportedly received US$68,100 from the Charles Koch Foundation, approximately 3% of AIER's revenue for the year. It has partnered with Emergent Order, a public relations company also funded by the Charles Koch Foundation.

== See also ==
- Misinformation about COVID-19
