= Marguerite Standish Cockett =

Archer

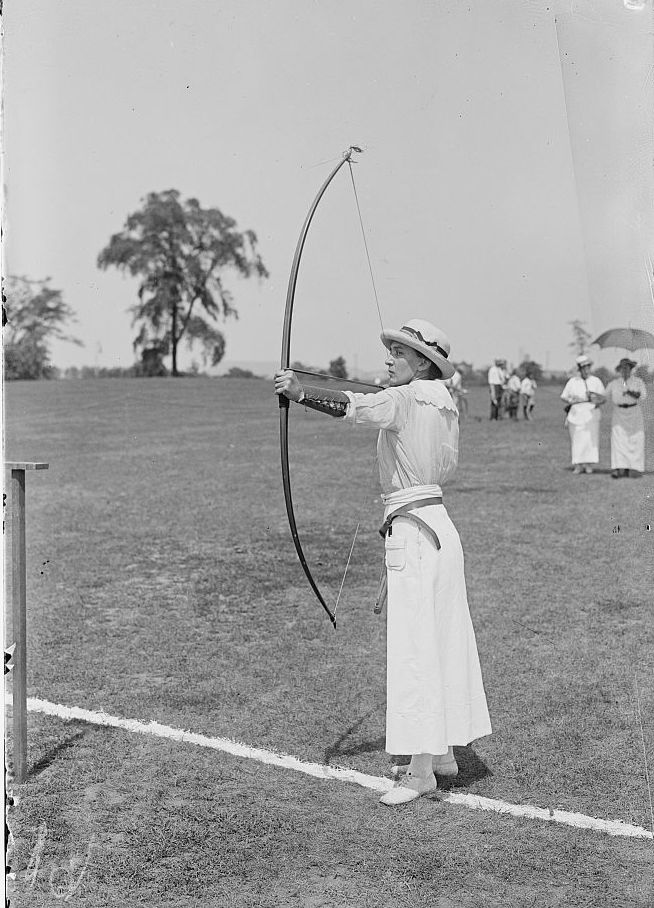
- Cockett at the 38th National Archery Association tournament on August 24, 1916, at Hudson County Park in Jersey City, New Jersey
- Born: August 7, 1878; Cooperstown, New York
- Died: April 19, 1954 (aged 75); San Diego, California

Marguerite Standish Cockett, M.D. (August 7, 1878 – April 19, 1954), was an American archer, ophthalmologist and World War I ambulance driver.

== Biography ==
She was born on August 7, 1878, in Cooperstown, New York, to Willard A. Cockett and Ollie Wood. She graduated from the Woman's Medical College of Pennsylvania in 1905. She was a resident physician at New England Hospital from 1905 to 1906. She did her specialty training in ophthalmology in Paris and London from 1909 to 1910.

On August 24, 1916, she participated in the 38th National Archery Association tournament at Hudson County Park in Jersey City, New Jersey.

During World War I, she started a female ambulance driver group with Hope Butler for the Twentieth French Army Corps where they served in Serbia.

She moved back to Cooperstown, New York, in 1919. She lived with Marjorie Jackson, and together they operated an antique store they started in 1922.

She died on April 19, 1954, in San Diego, California.
