= Henry J. Reilly =

United States Army general (1881–1993)

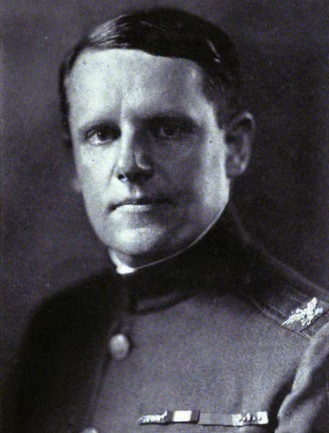
- Frontispiece of 1919's A Bug's-Eye View of the War, by Charles MacArthur
- Born: April 29, 1881; Fort Barrancas, Florida, US
- Died: December 13, 1963 (aged 82)
- Burial place: Arlington National Cemetery
- Military career
- Allegiance: United States
- Branch: United States Army
- Service years: 1904–1914; 1917–1948
- Rank: Brigadier general
- Awards: Army Distinguished Service Medal, Croix de Guerre with Palm, Commander Legion of Honor, Officier Ordre l'Etoile Noire
- Other work: Journalist

Henry Joseph Reilly (April 29, 1881 – December 13, 1963) was an American soldier and journalist who, after seeing combat in World War I, helped found the Reserve Officers Association.

== Early life and education ==
Born in Fort Barrancas, Florida, Reilly was the son of an artillery officer. His father Henry Joseph Reilly Sr. died in the 1900 Battle of Peking during the Chinese Boxer Rebellion, and his family moved to Winnetka, Illinois, soon afterward. Reilly graduated from the U.S. Military Academy in 1904.

== Early career ==
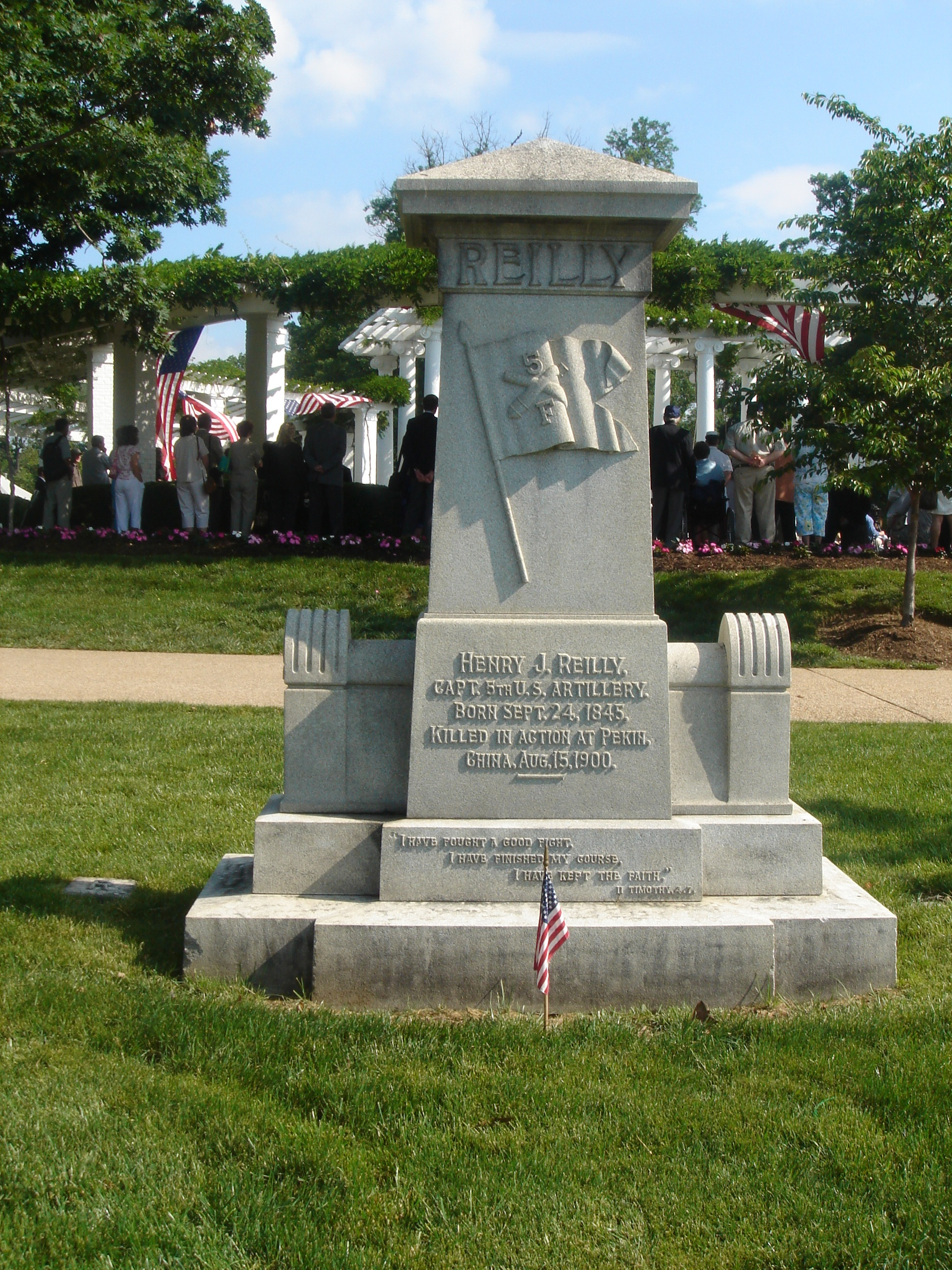
Grave at Arlington National Cemetery

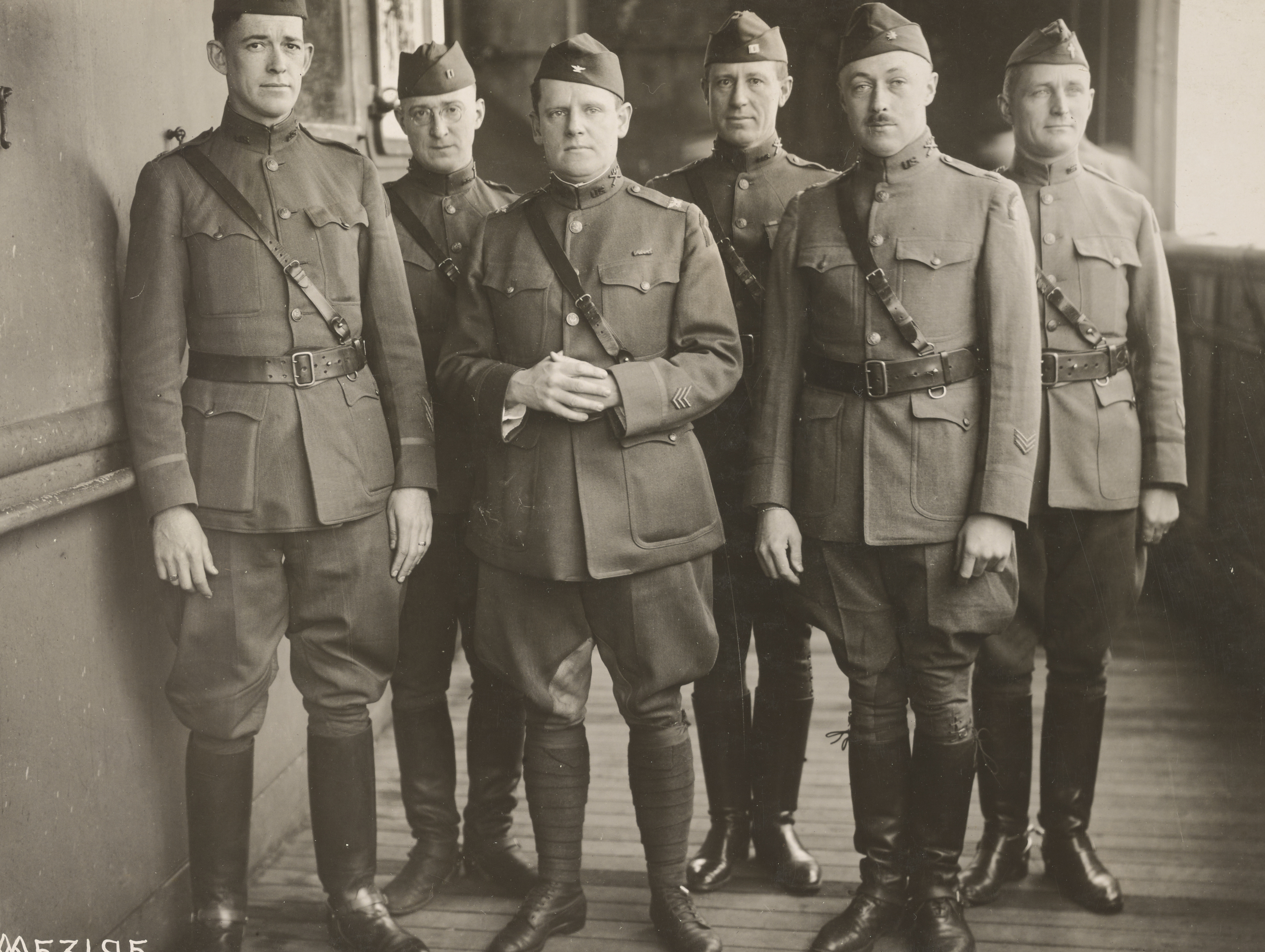
Colonel Henry J. Reilly, commanding the 149th Field Artillery Regiment, 42nd Division, and members of his staff during their return to the United States, April 1919.

In the years leading up to World War I, Reilly served in Asia and Europe, and he also wrote a weekly military column for the Chicago Tribune.

Reilly resigned his commission on January 8, 1914. He then served in British and French ambulance units.

When America entered the war in 1917, Reilly, by then a colonel, had assumed command of the 149th Field Artillery Regiment of the 42nd ("Rainbow") Division. His regiment saw combat in France, where it became known as "Reilly's Bucks." He also briefly commanded the 42nd Division's 83rd Infantry Brigade during the final stages of the Meuse–Argonne offensive. He took command of the brigade on October 20, 1918, and relinquished it to Brigadier General Frank Merrill Caldwell nine days after the November 11 armistice.

He was awarded the Army Distinguished Service Medal in 1919 for his service in the war. The medal's citation reads:

The President of the United States of America, authorized by Act of Congress, July 9, 1918, takes pleasure in presenting the Army Distinguished Service Medal to Colonel (Field Artillery) Henry Joseph Reilly, United States Army, for exceptionally meritorious and distinguished services to the Government of the United States, in a duty of great responsibility during World War I. In Command of the 149th Field Artillery, 42d Division, Colonel Reilly participated with credit in the operations of the 42d Division. Through his tireless energy and technical skill as an artillerist, his regiment gave most effective assistance to the Infantry which it supported.

== Post-war life ==
After the war, Reilly became a brigadier general in the Officer Reserve Corps and a well-known speaker, writer, journalist, and editor on military affairs. He served as a war correspondent, covering conflicts in Poland, Spain, Albania, and France. He edited the Army and Navy Journal from 1921 to 1925. He wrote several books, including Why Preparedness? (1916), based on what he had seen on Europe's eastern and western fronts in 1914 and 1915; America's Part (1926); and Americans All: History of the Rainbow Division (1936), which described the division's military actions, including stories about soldiers and officers from private to general.

In 1922, he helped found the Reserve Officers Association (ROA) and served as its first president. Today, the association has a scholarship named after him. The scholarship was suspended in April 2009 but has since returned to active use.

In 1938, Reilly was living near Paris; he visited Spain as an observer during its Civil War.

Upon his death in 1963 he was buried in Arlington National Cemetery.

== Awards ==
- Distinguished Service Medal
- Croix de Guerre with Palm
- Commander Legion of Honor
- Officier Ordre l'Etoile Noire

== Selected publications ==
- America's Part. New York: Cosmopolitan Book Corp, 1928. OCLC 1060254
- Americans All: The Rainbow at War: Official History of the 42nd Rainbow Division in the World War. Columbus, Ohio: F.J. Heer Print. Co, 1936. OCLC 1160721
- Are Our Young Men to Have a Chance?: Blitzkrieg, Its Political and Economic Challenge. Civilian Military Education Fund, 1940. OCLC 234161903
- The World War at a Glance: Essential Facts Concerning the Great Conflict between Democracy and Autocracy. Chicago: Laird & Lee, 1918. OCLC 27448249
- Why Preparedness; The Observations of an American Army Officer in Europe, 1914-1915. Chicago: Daughaday and Company, 1916. OCLC 911511

== Legacy ==
Reilly amassed a large personal library, storing several hundred volumes and documents at ROA headquarters in Washington, D.C. ROA later gave most of the collection to the Pritzker Military Museum & Library in Chicago, Illinois, where it is a non-circulating named collection called the Henry J. Reilly Memorial Library.
