= Rajan Menon =

Political scientist

Rajan Menon (born September 22, 1953) is a political scientist. Currently, Menon is the emeritus Anne and Bernard Spitzer Chair in Political Science at the City College of New York. He is also an Adjunct Senior Research Scholar of International and Public Affairs at the School of International and Public Affairs, Columbia University and a Senior Research Scholar at the Arnold A. Saltzman Institute of War and Peace Studies.

== Books ==
- Soviet power and the Third World Yale University Press, 1986.
- Limits to Soviet power, Lexington Books, 1989.
- Russia, the Caucasus, and Central Asia : the 21st century security environment, M.E. Sharpe, 1999.
- Energy and conflict in Central Asia and the Caucasus, Rowman & Littlefield Publishers, 2000.
- The end of alliances Oxford University Press, 2007.
- Conflict in Ukraine; The Unwinding of the Post–Cold War Order with Eugene B. Rumer, The MIT Press, 2015.
- The conceit of humanitarian intervention, Oxford University Press, 2016.
