= List of United States secretaries of state =

United States Secretary of State
- Official seal

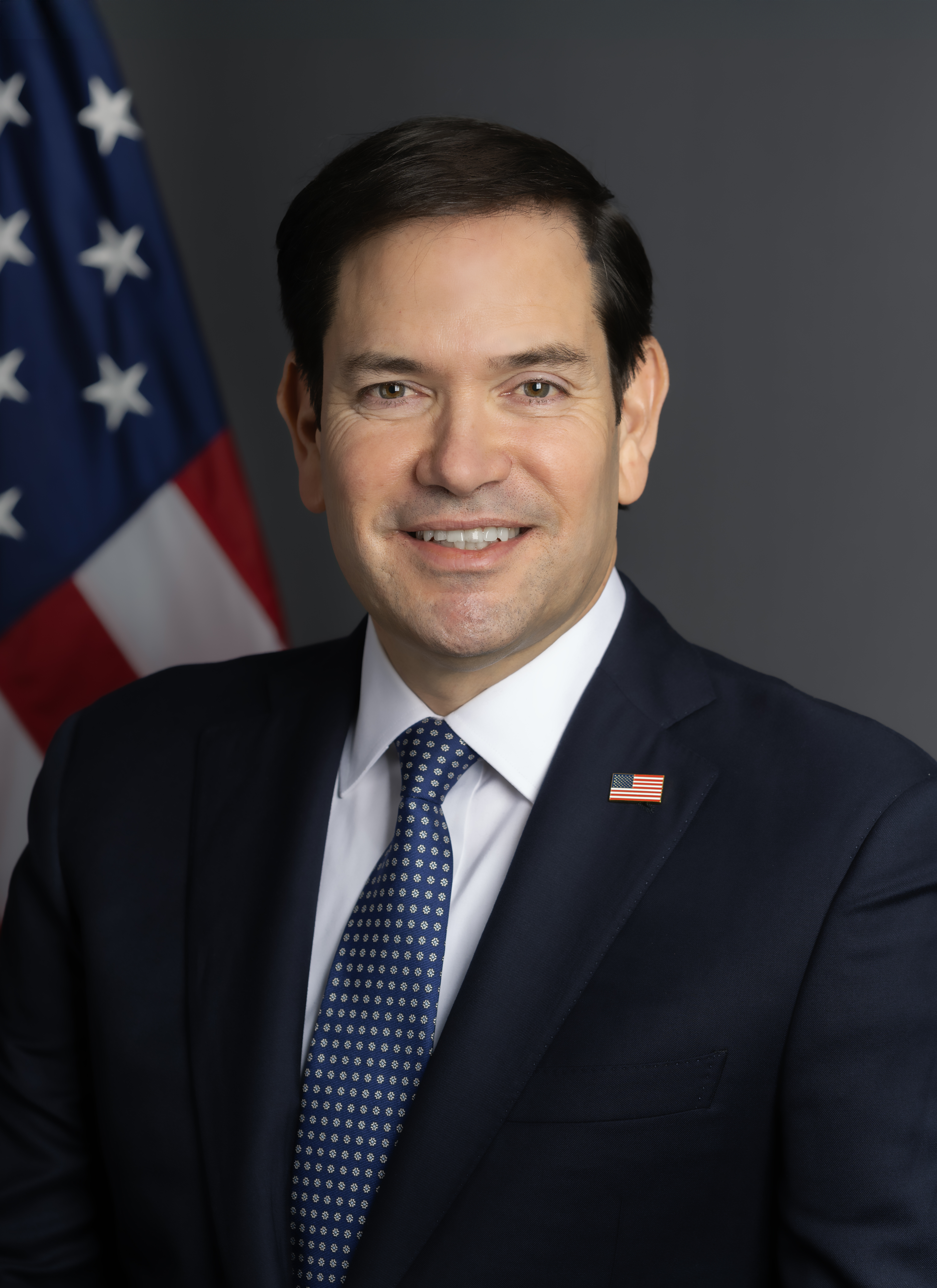
- Incumbent; Marco Rubio since January 21, 2025
- United States Department of State
- Appointer: President of the United States
- Inaugural holder: John Jay (acting); Thomas Jefferson
- Formation: July 27, 1789
- Succession: Fourth
- Website: www.state.gov

This is a list of United States secretaries of state.

== Secretaries of foreign affairs (1781–1789) ==
On January 10, 1780, the Congress of the Confederation created the Department of Foreign Affairs.

On August 10, 1781, Congress selected Robert R. Livingston, a delegate from New York, as the first secretary for foreign affairs. Livingston was unable to take office until October 20, 1781. He served until June 4, 1783, and was succeeded by Elias Boudinot, who was succeeded by John Jay on December 21, 1784, who served until March 4, 1789, when the government under the Articles of Confederation gave way to the government under the Constitution.

The office of secretary of foreign affairs and the Department of Foreign Affairs were reinstated by a law signed by George Washington on July 27, 1789. John Jay retained the post on an interim basis, pending the return of Thomas Jefferson from France.

Denotes acting capacity.

Secretaries of foreign affairs (1781–1789)
No.	Portrait	Name	State of residence	Took office	Left office
1		Robert R. Livingston (1746–1813)	New York	October 20, 1781	June 4, 1783
2		Elias Boudinot (1740–1821)	New Jersey	June 4, 1783	December 21, 1784
3		John Jay (1745-1829)	New York	December 21, 1784	March 4, 1789
—		John Jay; Acting (1745–1829)	New York	July 27, 1789	September 15, 1789

== Secretaries of state ==
On September 15, 1789, before Jefferson could return to take the post, Washington signed into law another act which changed the name of the office from Secretary of Foreign Affairs to Secretary of State, changed the name of the department to the Department of State, and added several domestic powers and responsibilities to both the office of secretary and the department. Thomas Jefferson took office as the first secretary of state on March 22, 1790.

Denotes acting capacity.

=== 18th and 19th centuries ===
List of secretaries of state from September 15, 1789 to September 29, 1898

N°	Secretary		Party	Vote (Note: Where no vote is listed, confirmation was by voice vote or otherwise unrecorded.)	Term of office			State	President(s)
N°	Portrait	Name	Party	Vote	Took office	Left office	Term Length	State	President(s)
–		John Jay (1745–1829)	Federalist	–	September 15, 1789	March 22, 1790	188 days	New York	George Washington (1789–1797)
1		Thomas Jefferson (1743–1826)	Democratic- Republican	–	March 22, 1790	December 31, 1793	3 years, 284 days	Virginia	George Washington (1789–1797)
2		Edmund Randolph (1753–1813)	Federalist	–	January 2, 1794	August 20, 1795	1 year, 232 days	Virginia	George Washington (1789–1797)
3		Timothy Pickering (1745–1829)	Federalist	–	August 20, 1795	December 10, 1795 (Note: As Secretary of War.)	4 years, 265 days	Pennsylvania	George Washington (1789–1797)
3		Timothy Pickering (1745–1829)	Federalist	–	December 10, 1795	May 12, 1800	4 years, 265 days	Pennsylvania	George Washington (1789–1797)
3		Timothy Pickering (1745–1829)	Federalist	–	December 10, 1795	May 12, 1800	4 years, 265 days	Pennsylvania	John Adams (1797–1801)
–		Charles Lee (1758–1815) (Note: As Attorney General.)	Federalist	–	May 13, 1800	June 5, 1800	23 days	Virginia	John Adams (1797–1801)
4		John Marshall (1755–1835)	Federalist	–	June 13, 1800	February 4, 1801	264 days	Virginia	John Adams (1797–1801)
4		John Marshall (1755–1835)	Federalist	–	February 4, 1801	March 4, 1801 (Note: As Chief Justice of the United States.)	264 days	Virginia	John Adams (1797–1801)
–		Levi Lincoln Sr. (1749–1820)	Democratic- Republican	–	March 5, 1801	May 1, 1801	57 days	Massachusetts	Thomas Jefferson (1801–1809)
5		James Madison (1751–1836)	Democratic- Republican	–	May 2, 1801	March 3, 1809	7 years, 305 days	Virginia	Thomas Jefferson (1801–1809)
6		Robert Smith (1757–1842)	Democratic- Republican	–	March 6, 1809	April 1, 1811	2 years, 26 days	Maryland	James Madison (1809–1817)
7		James Monroe (1758–1831)	Democratic- Republican	30–0	April 2, 1811	September 30, 1814	5 years, 335 days	Virginia	James Madison (1809–1817)
7		James Monroe (1758–1831)	Democratic- Republican	30–0	October 1, 1814	February 28, 1815	5 years, 335 days	Virginia	James Madison (1809–1817)
7		James Monroe (1758–1831)	Democratic- Republican	30–0	February 28, 1815	March 3, 1817	5 years, 335 days	Virginia	James Madison (1809–1817)
–		John Graham (1774–1820) (Note: As Chief Clerk of the State Department.)	Democratic- Republican	–	March 4, 1817	March 9, 1817	5 days	Kentucky	James Monroe (1817–1825)
–		Richard Rush (1780–1859)	Federalist	–	March 10, 1817	September 22, 1817	196 days	Pennsylvania	James Monroe (1817–1825)
8		John Quincy Adams (1767–1848)	Democratic- Republican	29–1	September 22, 1817	March 3, 1825	7 years, 162 days	Massachusetts	James Monroe (1817–1825)
–		Daniel Brent (1770–1841)	Democratic- Republican	–	March 4, 1825	March 7, 1825	3 days	Virginia	John Quincy Adams (1825–1829)
9		Henry Clay (1777–1852)	Democratic- Republican	27–14	March 7, 1825	March 3, 1829	3 years, 361 days	Kentucky	John Quincy Adams (1825–1829)
9		Henry Clay (1777–1852)	National; Republican	27–14	March 7, 1825	March 3, 1829	3 years, 361 days	Kentucky	John Quincy Adams (1825–1829)
–		James Alexander Hamilton (1788–1878)	Democratic	–	March 4, 1829	March 27, 1829	23 days	New York	Andrew Jackson (1829–1837)
10		Martin Van Buren (1782–1862)	Democratic	25–7	March 28, 1829	May 23, 1831	2 years, 56 days	New York	Andrew Jackson (1829–1837)
11		Edward Livingston (1764–1836)	Democratic	–	May 24, 1831	May 29, 1833	2 years, 5 days	Louisiana	Andrew Jackson (1829–1837)
12		Louis McLane (1786–1857)	Democratic	(Note: This appears to have been a recess appointment that was never submitted to the Senate.)	May 29, 1833	June 30, 1834	1 year, 32 days	Delaware	Andrew Jackson (1829–1837)
13		John Forsyth (1780–1841)	Democratic	–	July 1, 1834	March 3, 1841	6 years, 245 days	Georgia	Andrew Jackson (1829–1837)
13		John Forsyth (1780–1841)	Democratic	–	July 1, 1834	March 3, 1841	6 years, 245 days	Georgia	Martin Van Buren (1837–1841)
–		Jacob L. Martin (?–1848)	–	–	March 4, 1841	March 5, 1841	1 day	District of Columbia	William Henry Harrison (1841)
14		Daniel Webster (1782–1852)	Whig	–	March 6, 1841	May 8, 1843	2 years, 63 days	Massachusetts	William Henry Harrison (1841)
14		Daniel Webster (1782–1852)	Whig	–	March 6, 1841	May 8, 1843	2 years, 63 days	Massachusetts	John Tyler (1841–1845)
–		Hugh S. Legaré (1797–1843)	Democratic	–	May 9, 1843	June 20, 1843	42 days	South Carolina	John Tyler (1841–1845)
–		William S. Derrick (1802–1852)	–	–	June 21, 1843	June 23, 1843	2 days	Pennsylvania	John Tyler (1841–1845)
15		Abel P. Upshur (1791–1844)	Whig	–	June 24, 1843	July 23, 1843 (Note: As Secretary of the Navy.)	220 days	Virginia	John Tyler (1841–1845)
15		Abel P. Upshur (1791–1844)	Whig	–	July 24, 1843	February 28, 1844	220 days	Virginia	John Tyler (1841–1845)
–		John Nelson (1791–1860)	Whig	–	February 29, 1844	March 31, 1844	31 days	Maryland	John Tyler (1841–1845)
16		John C. Calhoun (1782–1850)	Democratic	–	April 1, 1844	March 10, 1845 (Note: In addition to the president listed, this secretary of state served for a brief period of time (eight days or less) under that president's successor until a replacement could be named and confirmed.)	343 days	South Carolina	John Tyler (1841–1845)
17		James Buchanan (1791–1868)	Democratic	–	March 10, 1845	March 7, 1849	3 years, 362 days	Pennsylvania	James K. Polk (1845–1849)
18		John M. Clayton (1796–1856)	Whig	–	March 8, 1849	July 22, 1850	1 year, 136 days	Delaware	Zachary Taylor (1849–1850)
18		John M. Clayton (1796–1856)	Whig	–	March 8, 1849	July 22, 1850	1 year, 136 days	Delaware	Millard Fillmore (1850–1853)
19		Daniel Webster (1782–1852)	Whig	–	July 23, 1850	October 24, 1852	2 years, 93 days	Massachusetts	Millard Fillmore (1850–1853)
–		Charles Magill Conrad (1804–1878)	Whig	–	October 25, 1852	November 5, 1852	11 days	Louisiana	Millard Fillmore (1850–1853)
20		Edward Everett (1794–1865)	Whig	–	November 6, 1852	March 3, 1853	117 days	Massachusetts	Millard Fillmore (1850–1853)
–		William Hunter (1805–1886)	–	–	March 4, 1853	March 7, 1853	3 days	Rhode Island	Franklin Pierce (1853–1857)
21		William L. Marcy (1786–1857)	Democratic	–	March 7, 1853	March 6, 1857	3 years, 364 days	New York	Franklin Pierce (1853–1857)
22		Lewis Cass (1782–1866)	Democratic	–	March 6, 1857	December 14, 1860	3 years, 283 days	Michigan	James Buchanan (1857–1861)
–		William Hunter (1805–1886)	–	–	December 15, 1860	December 16, 1860	1 day	Rhode Island	James Buchanan (1857–1861)
23		Jeremiah S. Black (1810–1883)	Democratic	–	December 17, 1860	March 5, 1861	78 days	New York	James Buchanan (1857–1861)
24		William H. Seward (1801–1872)	Republican	–	March 5, 1861	March 4, 1869	7 years, 364 days	New York	Abraham Lincoln (1861–1865)
24		William H. Seward (1801–1872)	Republican	–	March 5, 1861	March 4, 1869	7 years, 364 days	New York	Andrew Johnson (1865–1869)
25		Elihu B. Washburne (1816–1887)	Republican	–	March 5, 1869	March 16, 1869	11 days	Illinois	Ulysses S. Grant (1869–1877)
26		Hamilton Fish (1808–1893)	Republican	–	March 17, 1869	March 12, 1877	7 years, 360 days	New York	Ulysses S. Grant (1869–1877)
27		William M. Evarts (1818–1901)	Republican	44–2	March 12, 1877	March 7, 1881	3 years, 360 days	New York	Rutherford B. Hayes (1877–1881)
28		James G. Blaine (1830–1893)	Republican	–	March 7, 1881	December 19, 1881	287 days	Maine	James A. Garfield (1881)
28		James G. Blaine (1830–1893)	Republican	–	March 7, 1881	December 19, 1881	287 days	Maine	Chester A. Arthur (1881–1885)
29		Frederick T. Frelinghuysen (1817–1885)	Republican	–	December 19, 1881	March 6, 1885	3 years, 77 days	New Jersey	Chester A. Arthur (1881–1885)
30		Thomas F. Bayard (1828–1898)	Democratic	–	March 7, 1885	March 6, 1889	3 years, 364 days	Delaware	Grover Cleveland (1885–1889)
31		James G. Blaine (1830–1893)	Republican	–	March 7, 1889	June 4, 1892	3 years, 89 days	Maine	Benjamin Harrison (1889–1893)
–		William F. Wharton (1847–1919) (Note: As Assistant Secretary of State.)	Republican	–	June 4, 1892	June 29, 1892	25 days	Massachusetts	Benjamin Harrison (1889–1893)
32		John W. Foster (1836–1917)	Republican	–	June 29, 1892	February 23, 1893	239 days	Indiana	Benjamin Harrison (1889–1893)
–		William F. Wharton (1847–1919)	Republican	–	February 24, 1893	March 6, 1893	10 days	Massachusetts	Benjamin Harrison (1889–1893)
–		William F. Wharton (1847–1919)	Republican	–	February 24, 1893	March 6, 1893	10 days	Massachusetts	Grover Cleveland (1893–1897)
33		Walter Q. Gresham (1832–1895)	Democratic	–	March 7, 1893	May 28, 1895	2 years, 82 days	Illinois	Grover Cleveland (1893–1897)
–		Edwin F. Uhl (1841–1901)	Democratic	–	May 28, 1895	June 9, 1895	12 days	Michigan	Grover Cleveland (1893–1897)
34		Richard Olney (1835–1917)	Democratic	–	June 10, 1895	March 5, 1897	1 year, 268 days	Massachusetts	Grover Cleveland (1893–1897)
35		John Sherman (1823–1900)	Republican	–	March 6, 1897	April 27, 1898	1 year, 52 days	Ohio	William McKinley (1897–1901)
36		William R. Day (1849–1923)	Republican	–	April 28, 1898	September 16, 1898	141 days	Ohio	William McKinley (1897–1901)
–		Alvey A. Adee (1842–1924) (Note: As Second Assistant Secretary of State.)	Independent	–	September 17, 1898	September 29, 1898	12 days	New York	William McKinley (1897–1901)

=== 20th and 21st centuries ===
List of secretaries of state from September 30, 1898 to the present.

N°	Secretary		Party	Vote (Note: Where no vote is listed, confirmation was by voice vote or otherwise unrecorded.)	Term of office			State	President(s)
N°	Portrait	Name	Party	Vote	Took office	Left office	Term	State	President(s)
37		John Hay (1838–1905)	Republican	–	September 30, 1898	July 1, 1905	6 years, 274 days	District of Columbia	Theodore Roosevelt (1901–1909)
–		Francis B. Loomis (1861–1948)	Republican	–	July 1, 1905	July 18, 1905	17 days	Ohio	Theodore Roosevelt (1901–1909)
38		Elihu Root (1845–1937)	Republican	–	July 19, 1905	January 27, 1909	3 years, 192 days	New York	Theodore Roosevelt (1901–1909)
39		Robert Bacon (1860–1919)	Republican	–	January 27, 1909	March 5, 1909	37 days	New York	Theodore Roosevelt (1901–1909)
40		Philander C. Knox (1853–1921)	Republican	–	March 6, 1909	March 5, 1913	3 years, 364 days	Pennsylvania	William Howard Taft (1909–1913)
41		William Jennings Bryan (1860–1925)	Democratic	–	March 5, 1913	June 9, 1915	2 years, 96 days	Nebraska	Woodrow Wilson (1913–1921)
42		Robert Lansing (1864–1928)	Democratic	–	June 9, 1915	June 24, 1915 (Note: As Counselor for the Department of State.)	4 years, 249 days	New York	Woodrow Wilson (1913–1921)
42		Robert Lansing (1864–1928)	Democratic	–	June 24, 1915	February 13, 1920	4 years, 249 days	New York	Woodrow Wilson (1913–1921)
–		Frank Polk (1871–1943) (Note: As Under Secretary of State.)	Democratic	–	February 14, 1920	March 14, 1920	29 days	New York	Woodrow Wilson (1913–1921)
43		Bainbridge Colby (1869–1950)	Democratic	–	March 23, 1920	March 4, 1921	346 days	New York	Woodrow Wilson (1913–1921)
44		Charles Evans Hughes (1862–1948)	Republican	–	March 5, 1921	March 4, 1925	3 years, 364 days	New York	Warren G. Harding (1921–1923)
44		Charles Evans Hughes (1862–1948)	Republican	–	March 5, 1921	March 4, 1925	3 years, 364 days	New York	Calvin Coolidge (1923–1929)
45		Frank B. Kellogg (1856–1937)	Republican	–	March 5, 1925	March 28, 1929	4 years, 23 days	Minnesota	Calvin Coolidge (1923–1929)
45		Frank B. Kellogg (1856–1937)	Republican	–	March 5, 1925	March 28, 1929	4 years, 23 days	Minnesota	Herbert Hoover (1929–1933)
46		Henry L. Stimson (1867–1950)	Republican	–	March 28, 1929	March 4, 1933	3 years, 341 days	New York	Herbert Hoover (1929–1933)
47		Cordell Hull (1871–1955)	Democratic	–	March 4, 1933	November 30, 1944	11 years, 271 days	Tennessee	Franklin D. Roosevelt (1933–1945)
48		Edward Stettinius Jr. (1900–1949)	Democratic	68–1	December 1, 1944	June 27, 1945	208 days	Virginia	Franklin D. Roosevelt (1933–1945)
48		Edward Stettinius Jr. (1900–1949)	Democratic	68–1	December 1, 1944	June 27, 1945	208 days	Virginia	Harry S. Truman (1945–1953)
–		Joseph Grew (1880–1965)	Independent	–	June 28, 1945	July 3, 1945	5 days	New Hampshire	Harry S. Truman (1945–1953)
49		James F. Byrnes (1882–1972)	Democratic	–	July 3, 1945	January 21, 1947	1 year, 202 days	South Carolina	Harry S. Truman (1945–1953)
50		George C. Marshall (1880–1959)	Independent	–	January 21, 1947	January 20, 1949	1 year, 365 days	Pennsylvania	Harry S. Truman (1945–1953)
51		Dean Acheson (1893–1971)	Democratic	83–6	January 21, 1949	January 20, 1953	3 years, 365 days	Maryland	Harry S. Truman (1945–1953)
–		H. Freeman Matthews (1899–1986)	Independent	–	January 20, 1953	January 21, 1953	1 day	Maryland	Dwight D. Eisenhower (1953–1961)
52		John Foster Dulles (1888–1959)	Republican	–	January 21, 1953	April 22, 1959	6 years, 91 days	New York	Dwight D. Eisenhower (1953–1961)
53		Christian Herter (1895–1966)	Republican	93–0	April 22, 1959	January 20, 1961	1 year, 273 days	Massachusetts	Dwight D. Eisenhower (1953–1961)
–		Livingston T. Merchant (1903–1976) (Note: As Under Secretary of State for Political Affairs.)	Independent	–	January 20, 1961	January 21, 1961	1 day	District of Columbia	John F. Kennedy (1961–1963)
54		Dean Rusk (1909–1994)	Democratic	–	January 21, 1961	November 22, 1963	7 years, 365 days	New York	John F. Kennedy (1961–1963)
54		Dean Rusk (1909–1994)	Democratic	–	November 22, 1963	January 20, 1969	7 years, 365 days	New York	Lyndon B. Johnson (1963–1969)
–		Charles E. Bohlen (1904–1974) (Note: As Deputy Under Secretary of State for Political Affairs.)	Independent	–	January 20, 1969	January 22, 1969	2 days	District of Columbia	Richard Nixon (1969–1974)
55		William P. Rogers (1913–2001)	Republican	–	January 22, 1969	September 3, 1973	4 years, 224 days	Maryland	Richard Nixon (1969–1974)
–		Kenneth Rush (1910–1994) (Note: As Deputy Secretary of State.)	Republican	–	September 3, 1973	September 22, 1973	19 days	Florida	Richard Nixon (1969–1974)
56		Henry Kissinger (1923–2023)	Republican	78–7	September 22, 1973	January 20, 1977	3 years, 120 days	District of Columbia	Richard Nixon (1969–1974)
56		Henry Kissinger (1923–2023)	Republican	78–7	September 22, 1973	January 20, 1977	3 years, 120 days	District of Columbia	Gerald Ford (1974–1977)
–		Philip Habib (1920–1992)	Independent	–	January 20, 1977	January 23, 1977	3 days	California	Jimmy Carter (1977–1981)
57		Cyrus Vance (1917–2002)	Democratic	Voice	January 23, 1977	April 28, 1980	3 years, 96 days	New York	Jimmy Carter (1977–1981)
–		Warren Christopher (1925–2011)	Democratic	–	April 28, 1980	May 2, 1980	4 days	California	Jimmy Carter (1977–1981)
–		David D. Newsom (1918–2008)	Independent	–	May 2, 1980	May 3, 1980	1 day	California	Jimmy Carter (1977–1981)
–		Richard N. Cooper (1934–2020) (Note: As Under Secretary of State for Economic Affairs.)	Independent	–	May 3, 1980	May 3, 1980	0 days	Connecticut	Jimmy Carter (1977–1981)
–		David D. Newsom (1918–2008)	Independent	–	May 3, 1980	May 4, 1980	1 day	California	Jimmy Carter (1977–1981)
–		Warren Christopher (1925–2011)	Democratic	–	May 4, 1980	May 8, 1980	4 days	California	Jimmy Carter (1977–1981)
58		Edmund Muskie (1914–1996)	Democratic	94–2	May 8, 1980	January 18, 1981	255 days	Maine	Jimmy Carter (1977–1981)
–		David D. Newsom (1918–2008)	Independent	–	January 18, 1981	January 22, 1981	4 days	California	Jimmy Carter (1977–1981)
59		Alexander Haig (1924–2010)	Republican	93–6	January 22, 1981	July 5, 1982	1 year, 164 days	Connecticut	Ronald Reagan (1981–1989)
–		Walter J. Stoessel Jr. (1920–1986)	Independent	–	July 5, 1982	July 16, 1982	11 days	California	Ronald Reagan (1981–1989)
60		George Shultz (1920–2021)	Republican	97–0	July 16, 1982	January 20, 1989	6 years, 188 days	California	Ronald Reagan (1981–1989)
–		Michael Armacost (1937–2025)	Independent	–	January 20, 1989	January 25, 1989	5 days	Maryland	George H. W. Bush (1989–1993)
61		James Baker (b. 1930)	Republican	99–0	January 25, 1989	August 23, 1992	3 years, 211 days	Texas	George H. W. Bush (1989–1993)
62		Lawrence Eagleburger (1930–2011)	Republican	–	August 23, 1992	December 8, 1992	150 days	Florida	George H. W. Bush (1989–1993)
62		Lawrence Eagleburger (1930–2011)	Republican	Recess	December 8, 1992	January 20, 1993	150 days	Florida	George H. W. Bush (1989–1993)
–		Arnold Kanter (1945–2010) (Note: As Under Secretary of State for Political Affairs.)	Independent	–	January 20, 1993	January 20, 1993	0 days	District of Columbia	George H. W. Bush (1989–1993)
–		Frank G. Wisner (1938–2025) (Note: As Under Secretary of State for International Security Affairs.)	Independent	–	January 20, 1993	January 20, 1993	0 days	District of Columbia	Bill Clinton (1993–2001)
63		Warren Christopher (1925–2011)	Democratic	Voice	January 20, 1993	January 17, 1997	3 years, 363 days	California	Bill Clinton (1993–2001)
64		Madeleine Albright (1937–2022)	Democratic	99–0	January 23, 1997	January 20, 2001	3 years, 363 days	District of Columbia	Bill Clinton (1993–2001)
65		Colin Powell (1937–2021)	Republican	Voice	January 20, 2001	January 26, 2005	4 years, 6 days	Virginia	George W. Bush (2001–2009)
66		Condoleezza Rice (b. 1954)	Republican	85–13	January 26, 2005	January 20, 2009	3 years, 360 days	California	George W. Bush (2001–2009)
–		John Negroponte (b. 1939) (Note: Served as Acting United States Secretary of State for a few hours on January 20, 2009, in his capacity as United States Deputy Secretary of State, from noon on January 20, 2009 until President Barack Obama appointed Under Secretary of State for Political Affairs Bill Burns as Acting United States Secretary of State later in the afternoon on January 20, 2009.)	Republican	–	January 20, 2009	January 20, 2009	0 days	New York	Barack Obama (2009–2017)
–		Bill Burns (b. 1956)	Independent	–	January 20, 2009	January 21, 2009	1 day	District of Columbia	Barack Obama (2009–2017)
67		Hillary Clinton (b. 1947)	Democratic	94–2	January 21, 2009	February 1, 2013	4 years, 11 days	New York	Barack Obama (2009–2017)
68		John Kerry (b. 1943)	Democratic	94–3	February 1, 2013	January 20, 2017	3 years, 354 days	Massachusetts	Barack Obama (2009–2017)
–		Tom Shannon (b. 1958)	Republican	–	January 20, 2017	February 1, 2017	12 days	Minnesota	Donald Trump (2017–2021)
69		Rex Tillerson (b. 1952)	Republican	55–43	February 1, 2017	March 31, 2018	1 year, 58 days	Texas	Donald Trump (2017–2021)
–		John Sullivan (b. 1959)	Republican	–	April 1, 2018	April 26, 2018	25 days	Massachusetts	Donald Trump (2017–2021)
70		Mike Pompeo (b. 1963)	Republican	57–42	April 26, 2018	January 20, 2021	2 years, 269 days	Kansas	Donald Trump (2017–2021)
–		Daniel Bennett Smith (b. 1956) (Note: As Director of the Foreign Service Institute.)	Independent	–	January 20, 2021	January 26, 2021	6 days	Virginia	Joe Biden (2021–2025)
71		Antony Blinken (b. 1962)	Democratic	78–22	January 26, 2021	January 20, 2025	3 years, 360 days	New York	Joe Biden (2021–2025)
–		John R. Bass (b. 1964) (Note: Bass served as Acting United States Secretary of State, in his capacity as Under Secretary of State for Management and Acting Under Secretary of State for Political Affairs, for a few hours on January 20, 2025, pursuant to Department of State Delegation of Authority No. 513-1 titled “Delegation of the Authorities of the Secretary to Under Secretary John R. Bass” that was signed by Antony Blinken on December 21, 2022 and published in the Federal Register on January 6, 2023 and Department of State Delegation of Authority No. 553 titled “Delegation of Authority-Authorities of the Secretary” that was signed by Antony Blinken on March 29, 2024 and published in the Federal Register on April 10, 2024, from the time that Antony Blinken had formally resigned as United States Secretary of State at noon on January 20, 2025 until the time of the formal appointment of Principal Deputy Assistant Secretary of State for Intelligence and Research and Acting Assistant Secretary of State for Intelligence and Research Lisa D. Kenna as Acting United States Secretary of State, Acting Under Secretary of State for Political Affairs and Executive Secretary of the United States Department of State a few hours later in the afternoon on January 20, 2025.)	Independent	–	January 20, 2025	January 20, 2025	0 days	New York	Donald Trump (2025–present)
–		Lisa D. Kenna (b. 1965) (Note: As Principal Deputy Assistant Secretary of State for Intelligence and Research, Acting Assistant Secretary of State for Intelligence and Research, Acting Under Secretary of State for Political Affairs and Executive Secretary of the United States Department of State.)	Independent	–	January 20, 2025	January 21, 2025	1 day	Vermont	Donald Trump (2025–present)
72		Marco Rubio (b. 1971)	Republican	99–0	January 21, 2025	present	1 year, 274 days	Florida	Donald Trump (2025–present)

== List of secretaries of state by time in office ==
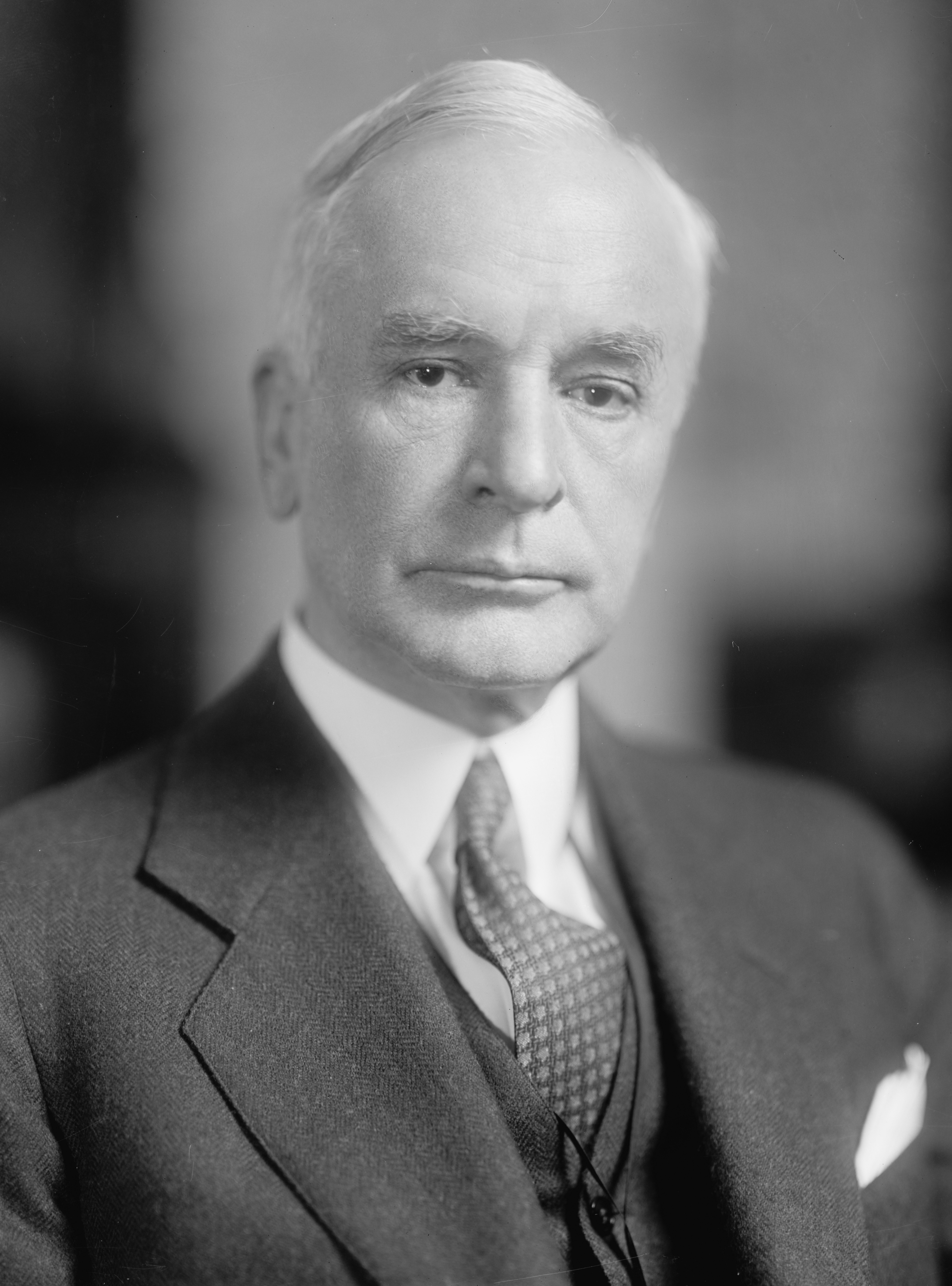
11 years, 271 days Cordell Hull from 1933 to 1944

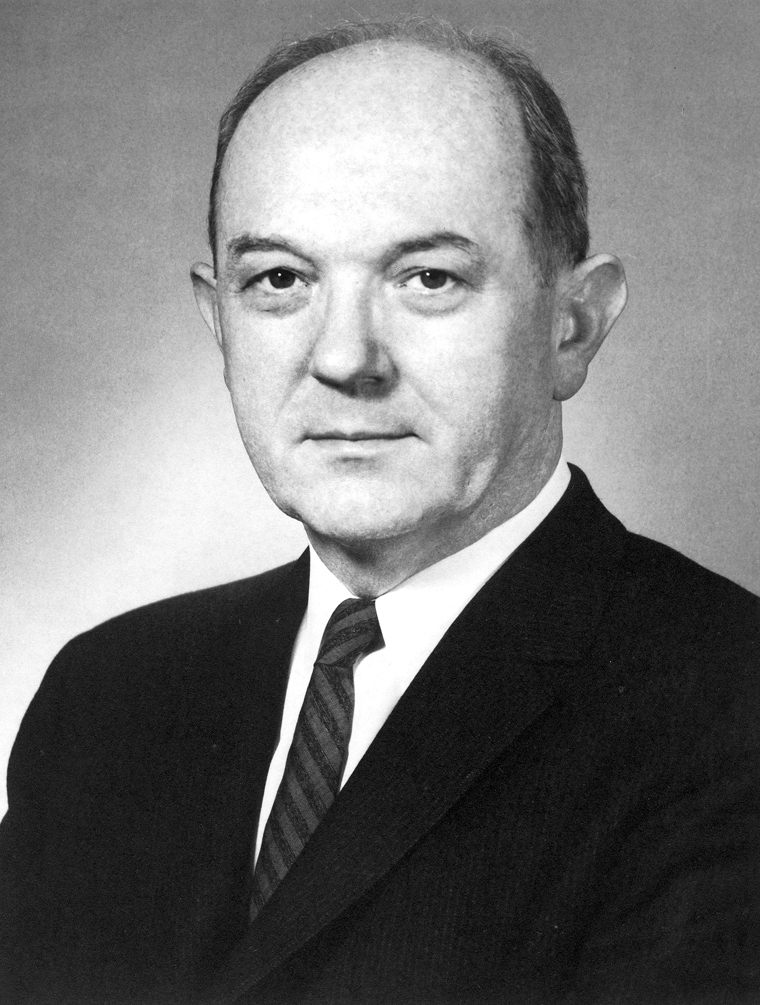
7 years, 364 days Dean Rusk from 1961 to 1969

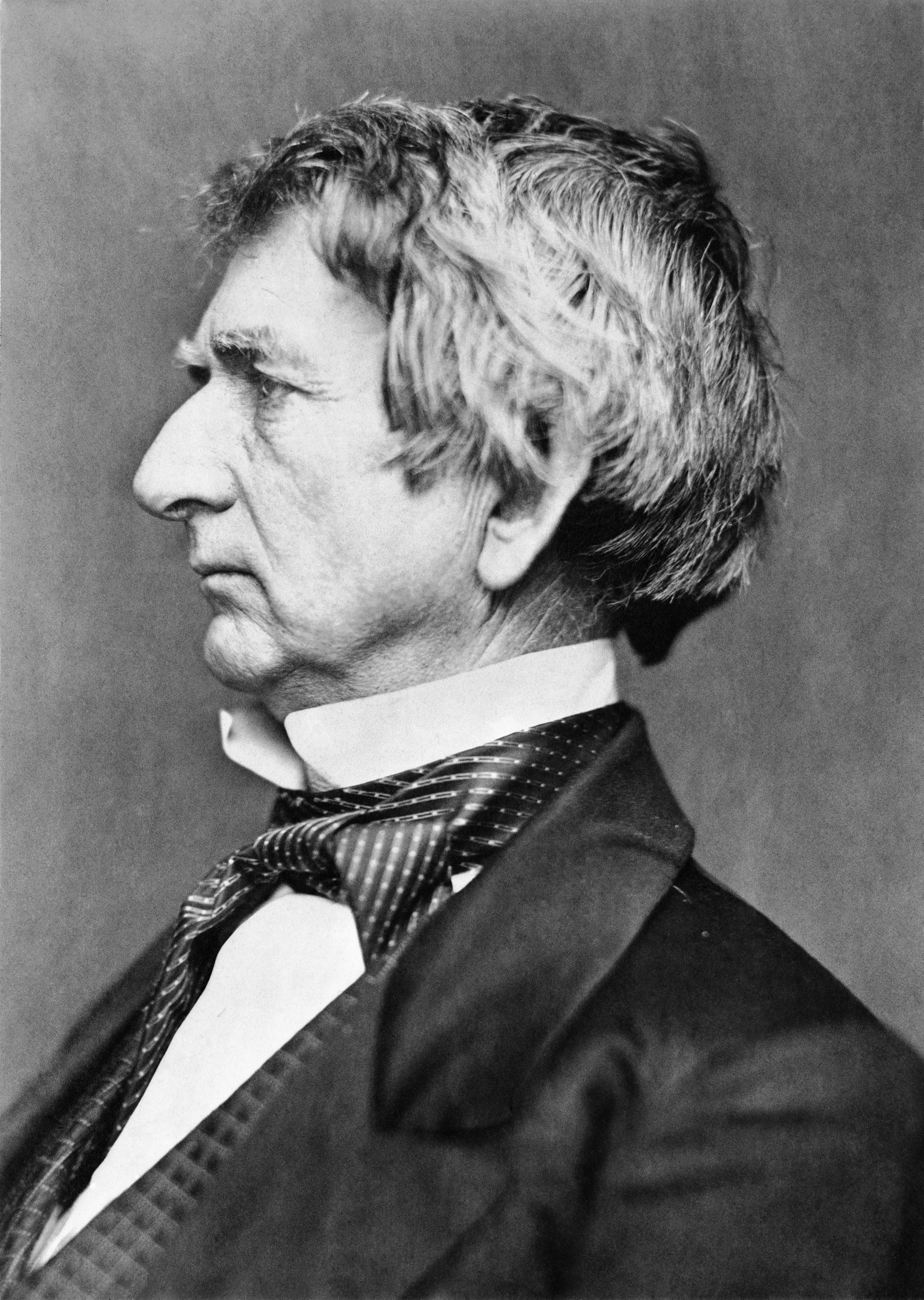
7 years, 364 days William H. Seward from 1861 to 1869

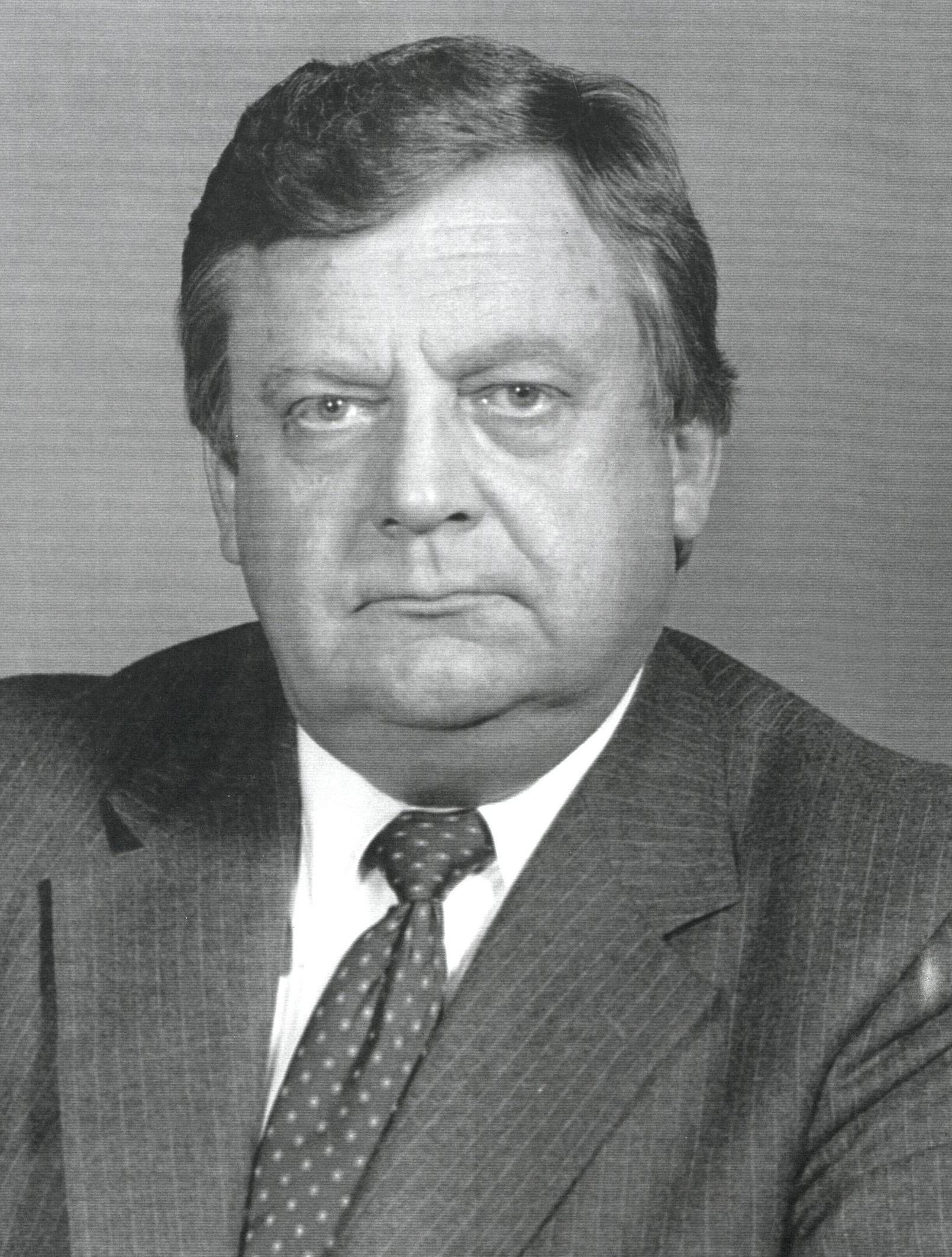
43 days Lawrence Eagleburger from 1992 to 1993

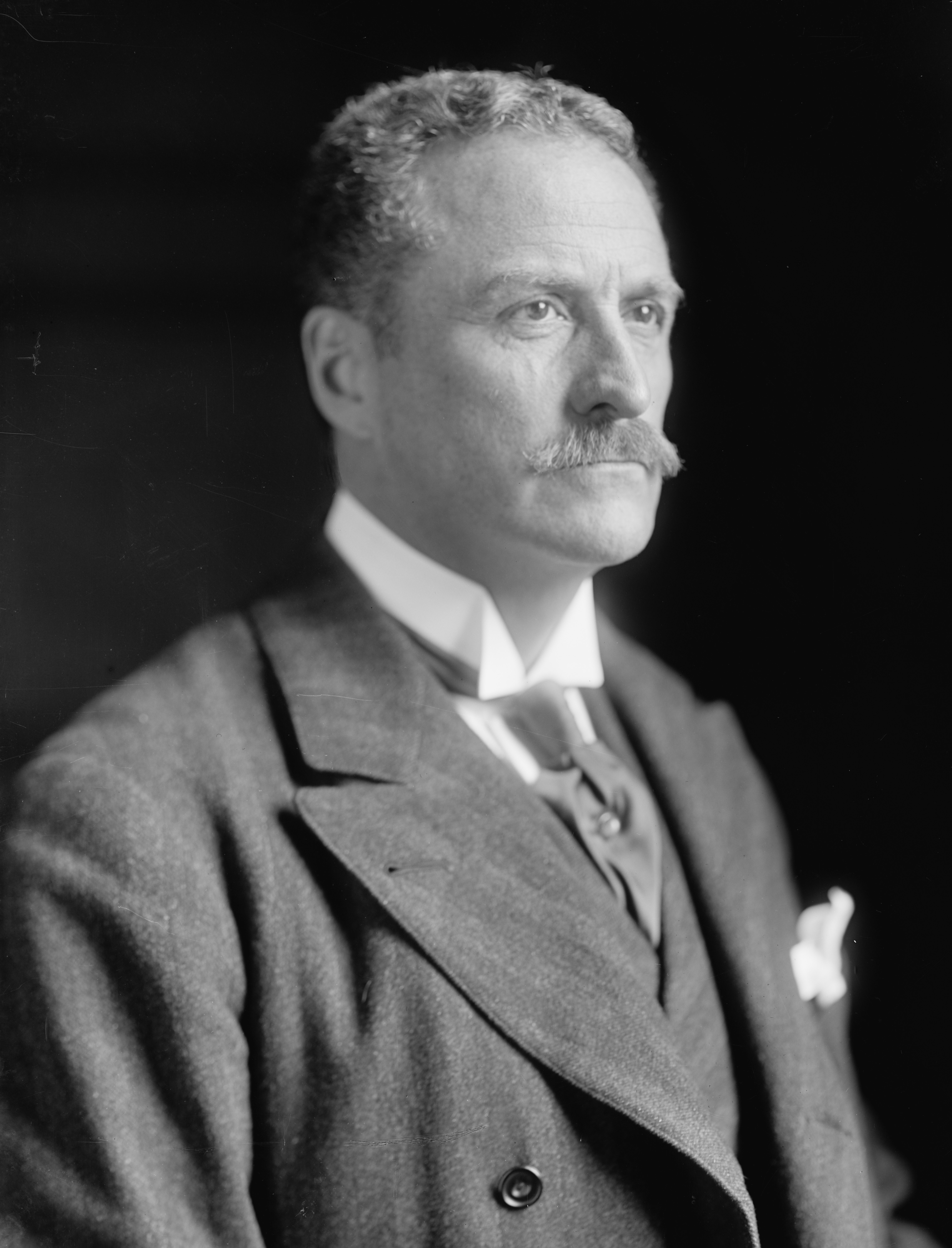
37 days Robert Bacon in 1909

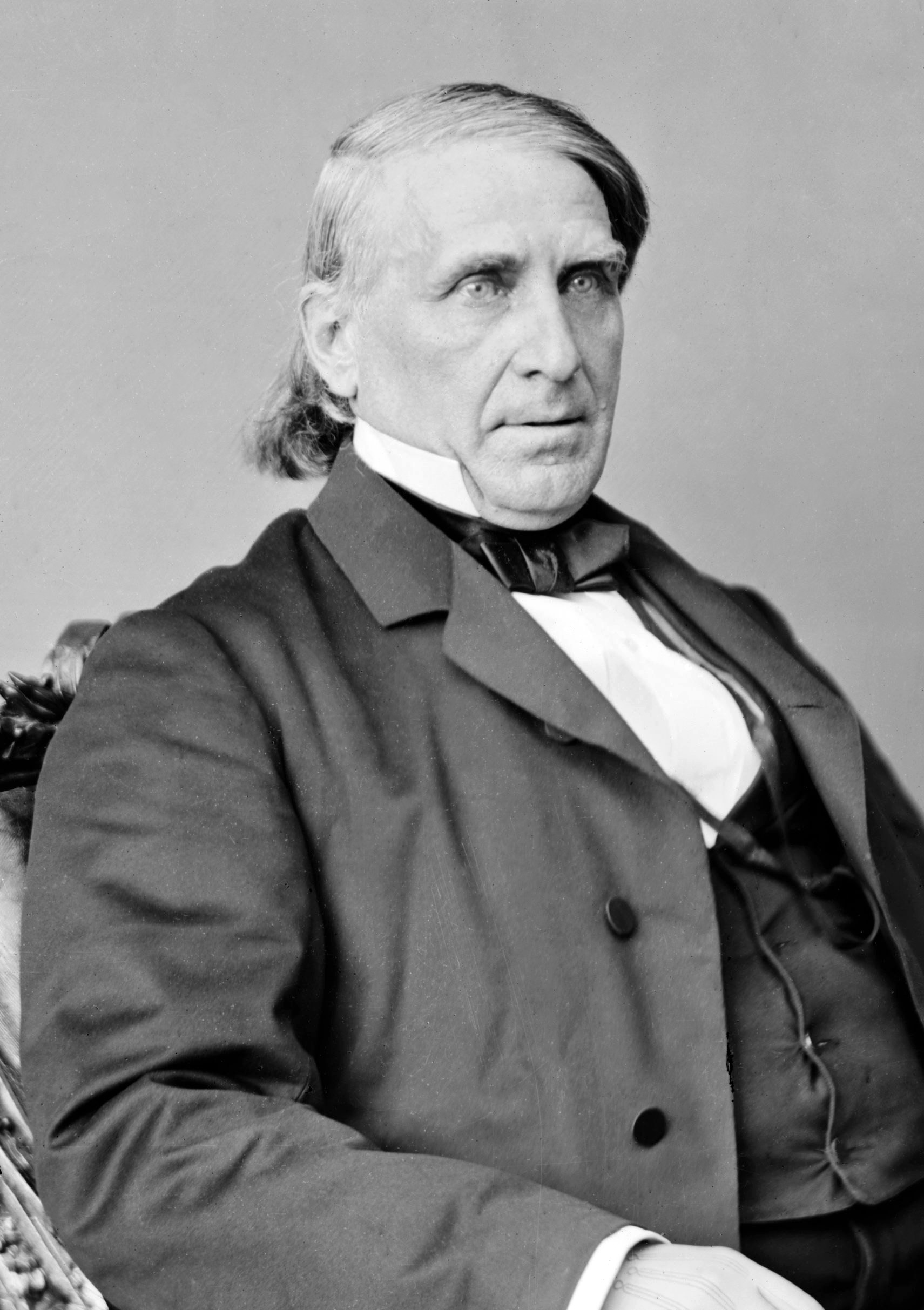
11 days Elihu B. Washburne in 1869

This is a list of United States secretaries of state by time in office. This is based on the difference between dates; if counted by number of calendar days all the figures would be one greater. Cordell Hull is the only person to have served as secretary of state for more than eight years. Daniel Webster and James G. Blaine are the only secretaries of state to have ever served non-consecutive terms. Warren Christopher served very briefly as acting secretary of state non-consecutively with his later tenure as full-fledged secretary of state. Elihu B. Washburne served as secretary of state for less than two weeks before becoming ambassador to France.

No. in office	Secretary	Length of service (days)	Rank
47	Cordell Hull	4289	1
54	Dean Rusk	2921	2
24	William H. Seward	2921	2
26	Hamilton Fish	2917	4
5	James Madison	2862	5
8	John Quincy Adams	2719	6
37	John Hay	2465	7
13	John Forsyth	2437	8
60	George Shultz	2380	9
52	John Foster Dulles	2282	10
7	James Monroe	2011	11
42	Robert Lansing	1695	12
55	William P. Rogers	1685	13
14/19	Daniel Webster	1617	14
3	Timothy Pickering	1614	15
45	Frank B. Kellogg	1484	16
28/31	James G. Blaine	1472	17
67	Hillary Clinton	1472	17
65	Colin Powell	1467	19
51	Dean Acheson	1460	20
21	William L. Marcy	1460	20
30	Thomas F. Bayard Sr.	1460	20
40	Philander C. Knox	1460	20
44	Charles Evans Hughes	1460	20
63	Warren Christopher	1458	25
64	Madeleine Albright	1458	25
17	James Buchanan	1458	25
9	Henry Clay	1457	28
27	William M. Evarts	1456	29
66	Condoleezza Rice	1455	30
71	Antony Blinken	1455	30
68	John Kerry	1449	32
46	Henry L. Stimson	1437	33
1	Thomas Jefferson	1380	34
22	Lewis Cass	1379	35
61	James Baker	1306	36
38	Elihu Root	1288	37
56	Henry Kissinger	1216	38
57	Cyrus Vance	1191	39
29	Frederick T. Frelinghuysen	1173	40
70	Mike Pompeo	1000	41
41	William Jennings Bryan	826	42
33	Walter Q. Gresham	812	43
10	Martin Van Buren	786	44
6	Robert Smith	756	45
11	Edward Livingston	736	46
50	George C. Marshall	730	47
72	Marco Rubio	639	48
53	Christian Herter	639	49
34	Richard Olney	634	50
2	Edmund Randolph	595	51
49	James F. Byrnes	567	52
59	Alexander Haig	529	53
18	John M. Clayton	501	54
69	Rex Tillerson	423	55
35	John Sherman	417	56
12	Louis McLane	397	57
43	Bainbridge Colby	346	58
16	John C. Calhoun	343	59
4	John Marshall	264	60
58	Edmund Muskie	257	61
32	John W. Foster	239	62
15	Abel P. Upshur	219	63
48	Edward Stettinius Jr.	208	64
36	William R. Day	141	65
20	Edward Everett	117	66
23	Jeremiah S. Black	78	67
62	Lawrence Eagleburger	43	68
39	Robert Bacon	37	69
25	Elihu B. Washburne	11	70
