= Chief Clerk (United States Department of State) =

Former U.S. government position

The Chief Clerk, between 1789 and 1853, was the second-ranking official within the United States Department of State, known as the Department of Foreign Affairs before September 5, 1789. Section 2 of the Act of Congress of July 27, 1789 (1 Stat. 28) establishing a Department of Foreign Affairs, authorized the Secretary to appoint a Chief Clerk, who would have custody of the Department's records whenever the office of the Secretary should be vacant. From 1789 to 1853, when Congress created the position of Assistant Secretary of State, the Chief Clerk was the second-ranking officer of the Department of State, and was responsible for supervision of Department personnel, distribution of correspondence, and day-to-day operations.

All Chief Clerks were designated, not commissioned. After 1853, the Chief Clerk's duties included at various times custody of archives, distribution of correspondence, and supervision of Department personnel and property. The office was abolished on January 26, 1939, re-established August 6, 1942, as the Office of the Chief Clerk and Administrative Assistant, and abolished in the reorganization of January 15, 1944. Although the Chief Clerk was the second-ranking officer until 1853, the holder of the office of Chief Clerk did not always become Acting Secretary of State in the Secretary's absence, and sometimes that position was delegated to other Cabinet members.

== List of Chief Clerks ==
All Chief Clerks were non-career appointees.

No.	Image	Name	State of Residency	Term start	Term end	Notes
1		Henry Remsen Jr.	New York	July 27, 1789	December 31, 1789	As Under Secretary of Foreign Affairs, was appointed Chief Clerk after creation of Department of Foreign Affairs.
2		Roger Alden	Connecticut	January 1, 1790	July 25, 1790	
3		Henry Remsen Jr.	New York	September 1, 1790	March 31, 1792	
4		George Taylor Jr.	New York	April 1, 1792	February 7, 1798	
5		Jacob Wagner	Pennsylvania	February 8, 1798	March 31, 1807	
6		John Graham	Virginia	July 1, 1807	July 18, 1817	
7		Daniel Brent	Virginia	September 22, 1817	August 22, 1833	
8		Asbury Dickins	North Carolina	August 23, 1833	December 12, 1836	
9		Aaron Ogden Dayton	New Jersey	December 13, 1836	June 25, 1838	
10		Aaron Vail	New York	June 26, 1838	July 15, 1840	
11		Jacob L. Martin	North Carolina	July 16, 1840	March 5, 1841	
12		Daniel Fletcher Webster	Massachusetts	March 6, 1841	April 23, 1843	
13		William S. Derrick	Pennsylvania	April 24, 1843	April 9, 1844	
14		Richard K. Cralle	Virginia	April 10, 1844	March 10, 1845	
15		William S. Derrick	Pennsylvania	March 11, 1845	August 27, 1845	
16		Nicholas P. Trist	Virginia	August 28, 1845	April 14, 1847	
17		William S. Derrick	Pennsylvania	April 15, 1847	January 25, 1848	
18		John Appleton	Maine	January 26, 1848	April 25, 1848	
19		William S. Derrick	Pennsylvania	April 25, 1848	May 15, 1852	
20		William Hunter Jr.	Rhode Island	May 17, 1852	May 7, 1855	Continued to serve as Chief Clerk after the appointment of A. Dudley Mann as Assistant Secretary of State.
