= Asbury Dickins =

American publisher and civil servant (1780–1861)

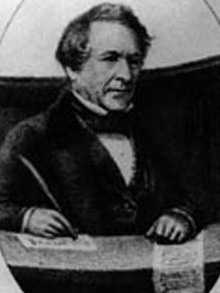

4th Secretary of the United States Senate
- In office December 13, 1836 – July 15, 1861
- Preceded by: Walter Lowrie
- Succeeded by: John Weiss Forney

8th Chief Clerk of the Department of State
- In office August 23, 1833 – December 12, 1836
- Preceded by: Daniel Brent
- Succeeded by: Aaron Ogden Dayton

Personal details
- Born: July 29, 1780 Halifax County, North Carolina
- Died: October 23, 1861 (aged 81) Washington, D.C.

Asbury Dickins (July 29, 1780 – October 23, 1861) was a United States government official who served as Secretary of the United States Senate from 1836 until shortly before he died in 1861.

Originally from North Carolina, Dickins moved to Philadelphia, Pennsylvania and worked as a publisher and a bookseller. He formed a partnership with Joseph Dennie in 1800 and they began printing The Port Folio, a literary and political magazine, in January 1801.

Dickins entered government service as chief clerk of the U.S. Department of the Treasury in 1829. He then moved to the U.S. Department of State in 1833, again serving as the department's chief clerk. Dickins finally became Secretary of the Senate in 1836 and served under both Democratic and Whig majorities. During his tenure, the Secretary's office increased in size and professionalism.

Dickins died at his home in Washington, D.C. on October 23, 1861.
