= James L. Bates =

Union colonel during the American Civil War (1820–1875)

- Born: August 11, 1820; Weymouth, Massachusetts
- Died: November 11, 1875 (aged 55); Weymouth, Massachusetts
- Military career
- Allegiance: United States of America
- Branch: United States Army; Union Army
- Service years: 1861–1864
- Rank: Colonel; Brevet Brigadier General
- Commands: 12th Regiment Massachusetts Volunteer Infantry; 2nd Brigade, 2nd Division, V Corps
- Conflicts: American Civil War: Battle of Gettysburg

James Lawrence Bates (August 11, 1820–November 11, 1875) was a colonel in the Union Army during the American Civil War who was awarded the honorary grade of brevet brigadier general after the war. He was born in Weymouth, Massachusetts, and, in civilian life, was a merchant in the leather trade.

== Civil War ==
On June 26, 1861, Bates was commissioned captain of Company H, 12th Massachusetts. He was promoted to major on August 6, 1862, and transferred to the 33rd Massachusetts Volunteer Infantry. His old regiment, the 12th Massachusetts, suffered terrible casualties during the Battle of Antietam, including the loss of its colonel, Fletcher Webster. Bates was therefore promoted to colonel on September 19, 1862, and placed in command of the 12th Massachusetts to replace Webster. While commanding the 12th, Bates was wounded during the Battle of Gettysburg.

During May and June 1864, Bates commanded the 2nd Brigade, 2nd Division of the V Corps. In this capacity, after the Battle of Spotsylvania Court House, Bates intercepted intelligence which ultimately affected the movement of the Army of the Potomac during the Overland Campaign for which he received the thanks of Lt. Gen. Ulysses Grant.

Bates was mustered out on July 8, 1864, in Boston, Massachusetts. After the war, in 1868, Congress awarded him the honorary grade of brevet brigadier general for "gallant and meritorious service."

== Post war ==
Bates served as commander of the Department of Massachusetts of the Grand Army of the Republic, a fraternal organization for veterans of the Union Army.

== See also ==
- List of Massachusetts generals in the American Civil War
- Massachusetts in the American Civil War
