= Nicholas Trist =

American diplomat (1800–1874)

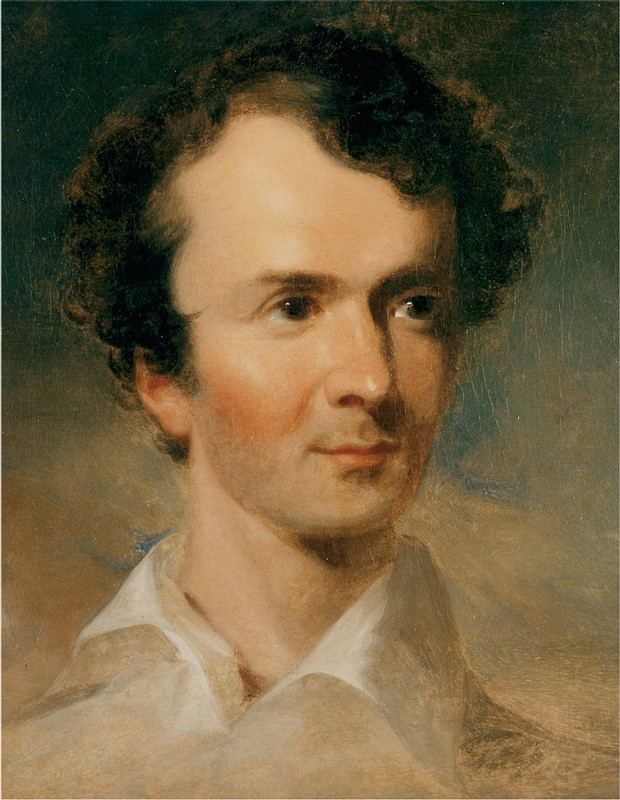
- Portrait by John Neagle, in 1835

16th Chief Clerk of the Department of State
- In office August 28, 1845 – April 14, 1847
- President: James K. Polk
- Preceded by: William S. Derrick
- Succeeded by: William S. Derrick

Personal details
- Born: Nicholas Trist; June 2, 1800 Charlottesville, Virginia, U.S.
- Died: February 11, 1874 (aged 73) Alexandria, Virginia, U.S.
- Resting place: Ivy Hill Cemetery (Alexandria, Virginia)
- Party: Democrat (before 1860); Radical Republican (after 1860)
- Spouse: Virginia Jefferson Randolph (m. 1824)
- Children: 3
- Education: United States Military Academy (did not graduate)
- Known for: Negotiations for the Treaty of Guadalupe Hidalgo
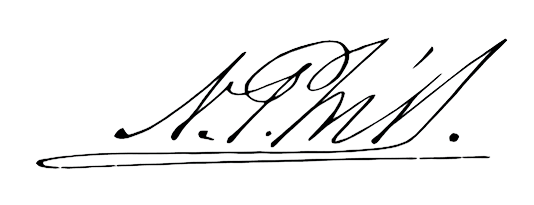
- Signature

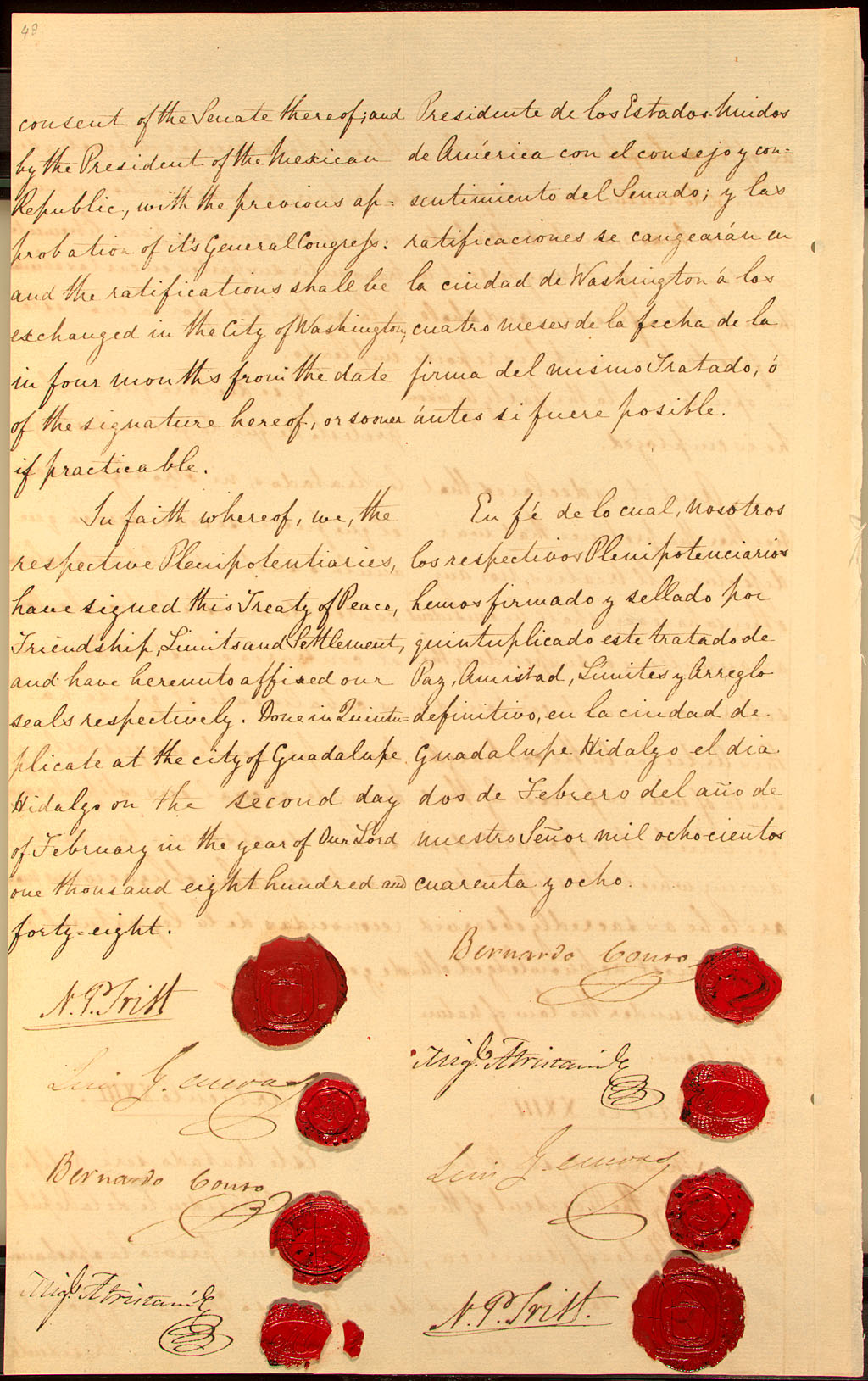
Treaty of Guadalupe Hidalgo signed by Trist

Nicholas Philip Trist (June 2, 1800 – February 11, 1874) was an American lawyer, diplomat, planter, and businessman. Even though he had been dismissed by President James K. Polk as the negotiator with the Mexican government, he negotiated the Treaty of Guadalupe Hidalgo in 1848, which ended the Mexican–American War. The U.S. conquered Mexican territory and vastly expanded the United States. All or part of ten current states were carved out of former Mexican territory.

An ardent Democrat in his early life, Trist was personally educated by Thomas Jefferson and attended the University of Virginia, marrying into the Jefferson family. Trist became a US diplomat and became fluent in Spanish. During his time as a diplomatic consul in Cuba, Trist grew to respect Spanish culture and the Catholic religion, which was unprecedented for a high ranking American public official in the 19th century. During the Mexican War, Trist grew to become alienated by US actions in the war, plus President Polk's ambition to turn Northern Mexico into American slave territory, and gained sympathy for the Mexican people.

During the peace treaty with Mexico, Trist chose the small town of Guadalupe Hidalgo as the site for peace talks due to the presence of the Virgin of Guadalupe, Mexico's most important Catholic shrine. In the middle of the peace talks, Trist was fired from his job over irreconcilable differences with his President James Polk. Despite Polk wanting to annex all of Northern Mexico, Trist went against his President's demands and secretly returned back Northern Mexico to the Mexican government, due to growing American domestic discontent over the duration of the war and the instability of the Mexican government and the Mexican diplomat's unwillingness to allow the US to seize Northern Mexico. Polk was enraged by Trist's actions but was forced to accept the Treaty due to growing home discontent over the war and the US Congress threatening to withhold pay for US troops. His actions in Mexico ruined his standing within US politics and he became a political pariah for several decades. In the 1860s, Trist became an ardent supporter of Republican Presidential candidate Abraham Lincoln and became an ardent abolitionist and Radical Republican.

== Early years ==
Trist was born in Charlottesville, Virginia. He was the son of Hore Browse Trist, a lawyer, and Mary Brown. His grandfather was from England, while his grandmother, Elizabeth House Trist, was an acquaintance and friend of Thomas Jefferson. Trist attended West Point but did not graduate and then studied law under Thomas Jefferson. Trist served as Jefferson's personal secretary in the 1820s and became an executor of his estate. Jefferson treated Trist like his own son and was present at Jefferson's death on July 4, 1826.

Trist married Virginia Jefferson Randolph, Thomas Jefferson's beloved granddaughter and daughter of Martha Jefferson Randolph, on September 11, 1824. They had three children, Martha Jefferson Trist Burke (1826–1915), Thomas Jefferson Trist (1828–1890), and Hore Browse Trist (1832–1896).

He served as a clerk in the U.S. State Department in 1828–1832, including a one-year assignment in 1831 as private secretary to Andrew Jackson, whom he greatly admired. Trist provided a conduit of communication for James Madison to President Jackson.

== Consul in Havana ==
Trist was appointed U.S. consul in Havana, Cuba, a Spanish territory at the time, by President Jackson, in which capacity he served from 1833 to 1841. Members of a British commission sent to Cuba to investigate violations of the treaty ending the African slave trade claimed that Trist was involved in the creation of false documents designed to mask illegal sales of Africans into bondage. For a time Trist also served as the consul in Cuba for Portugal. As U.S. consul, Trist became unpopular with New England ship captains who believed he was more interested in maintaining good relations with Cuban officials than defending their interests. Captains and merchants pressed members of Congress for Trist's removal. In late 1838 or early 1839, the British commissioner Dr. Richard Robert Madden wrote U.S. abolitionists about Trist's misuse of his post to promote slavery and earn fees from the fraudulent document schemes. A pamphlet detailing Madden's charges was published shortly before the beginning of the sensational Amistad affair, when Africans sold into slavery in Cuba managed to seize control of the schooner in which they were being transported from Havana to provincial plantations. Madden travelled to the United States, where he gave expert testimony in the trial of the Amistad Africans, explaining how false documents were used to make it appear the Africans were Cuban-born slaves.

This exposure of the activities of the U.S. Consul General, coupled with the complaints of ship captains, caused a Congressional investigation and eventual recall of Trist in 1841 and his actions in Cuba were investigated by the House Commerce Committee which concluded there was no wrongdoing and the state department which concluded that while he could've taken more action in preventing the use of ships with the American flag participating in the illegal slave trade but that his "omission to do so has not been the result of indifference or any more corrupt motive; but of a settled conviction that any measures which he could take for the purposes alluded to would be entirely ineffectual from the impossibility of procuring such evidence as would be available in a court of justice." and he was not charged for his inaction.

== Mexican–American War negotiator ==
Map of negotiation of the border between Mexico and the United States (1845-1848) as part of the American intervention in México.

Trist remained in Cuba until 1845, when President James K. Polk appointed him as a chief clerk in the State Department. In 1847, during the Mexican–American War, President Polk sent Trist to negotiate with the government of Mexico. He was ordered to arrange an armistice with Mexico wherein the U.S. would offer a restitution up to $30 million U.S. dollars, depending on whether he could obtain Baja California and additional southern territory along with the already planned acquisitions of Alta California, the Nueces Strip, and New Mexico. If he could not obtain Baja California and additional territory to the south, then he was instructed to offer $20 million. President Polk was unhappy with his envoy's conduct which prompted him to order Trist to return to the United States. General Winfield Scott was also unhappy with Trist's presence in Mexico, although he and Scott quickly reconciled and began a lifelong friendship.

Trist ignored the order to leave Mexico, and wrote a 65-page letter back to Washington, D.C. explaining his reasons for staying. He capitalized on the opportunity to continue bargaining with Santa Anna offering $15 million. Trist successfully negotiated the Treaty of Guadalupe Hidalgo on February 2, 1848. Trist's negotiation was controversial due to him negotiating and signing the treaty after being recalled along with the terms of the treaty, the treaty would acquire all territory that was required per the orders he had received as negotiator but a considerable amount of expansionist Democrats felt that more land should have been annexed, including Polk himself. While Trist was in Mexico, Polk started believing he should have demanded more territory from Mexico than what he had ordered to Trist. After receiving the treaty, Polk wrote in his diary "if the treaty was now to be made, I should demand more territory, perhaps to make the Sierra Madra the line".

Polk was furious with Trist's conduct in Mexico and promptly fired him, but decided to approve the treaty Trist had negotiated since it still included all of the territory that he found essential; he also believed that if he rejected the treaty, Congress would not approve any further aid for the military occupation of Mexico. Trist’s treaty still followed Polk’s initial orders that Congress had approved. Polk also feared, with the upcoming 1848 election, the potential of a Whig Administration coming into power before a treaty was approved; the Whigs overwhelmingly disapproved of the war and the Polk Administration, and thus may have rejected any annexation at all.

Trist later commented on the treaty, saying:

"My feeling of shame as an American was far stronger than the Mexicans' could be."

== Later years ==
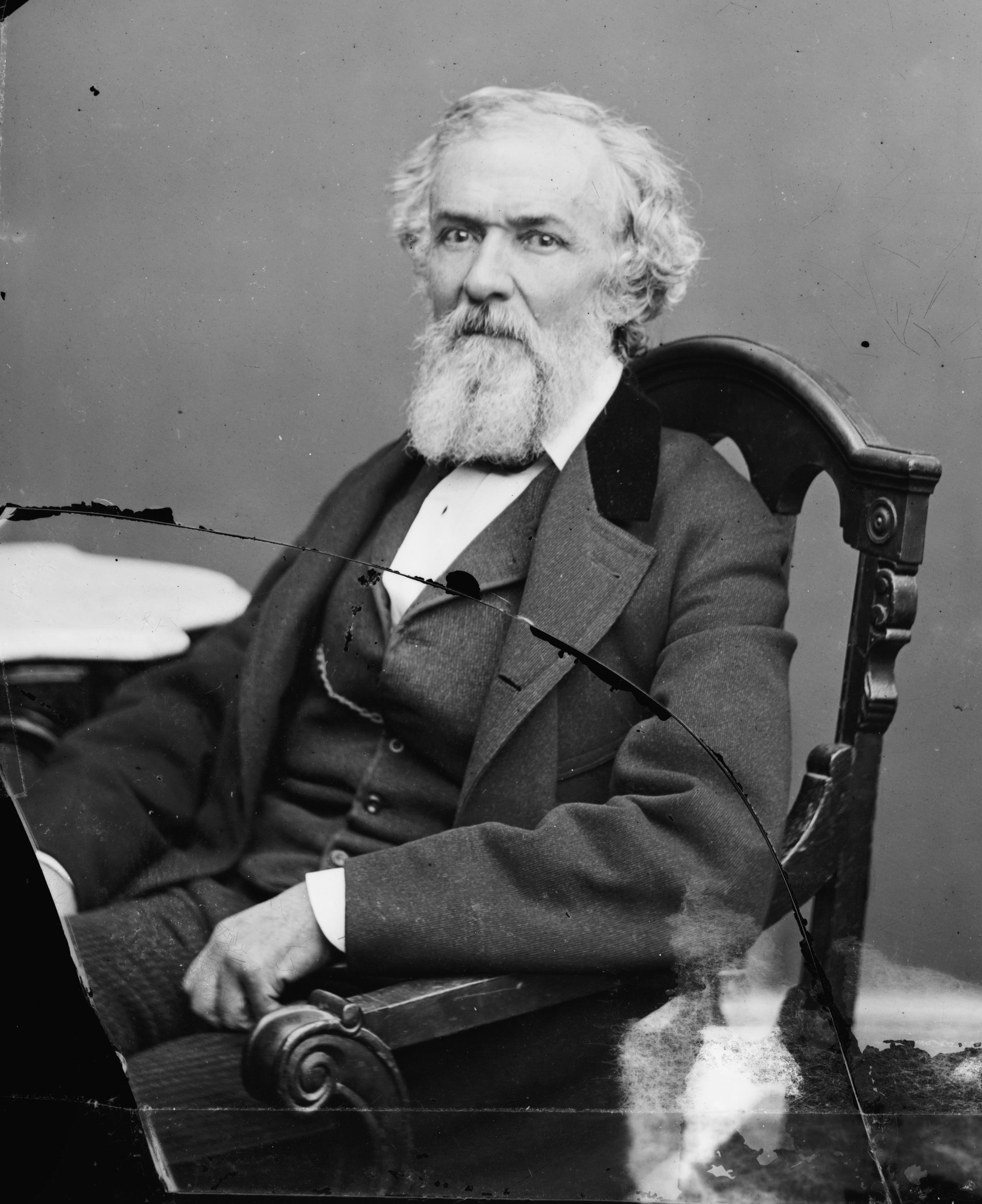
Trist in his later years

Upon return to Washington, Trist was immediately fired for his insubordination, and his expenses since the time of the recall order were not paid. After his dismissal, Trist moved to West Chester, Pennsylvania, and then to Philadelphia, where he worked as a railroad clerk and paymaster. Trist finally recovered his expenses in 1871, at the urging of Senator Charles Sumner.

Trist supported Republican Abraham Lincoln for U.S. president in 1860. While the Lincoln administration did not offer Trist any patronage, he did serve as postmaster of Alexandria, Virginia, during the Grant administration.

Trist resided in New York and later Philadelphia as a middle class lawyer after the Mexican War, having lost most of his money in the aftermath of the Mexican War and did not own slaves in the 1860s. He wrote several dozen pamphlets that argued that secession was illegal. Trist remained friends with Winfield Scott, the prominent commander of the US Army during the Civil War and himself a fellow Southern Unionist. Trist offered the Union military advice during the Civil War. He and his wife would remain staunch Unionists for the duration of the Civil War. During the war multiple family members of Trist but especially his wife would associate themselves with the Confederate side in the Civil War, most notably his wife's Randolph family. In his later life Trist would additionally significantly help biographers like Henry S. Randall and assisting him with private documents related to Thomas Jefferson to help craft histories of Thomas Jefferson that was separated from Confederate Southern narratives of Thomas Jefferson.

He died in Alexandria on February 11, 1874, aged 73.

Government offices
Preceded by William S. Derrick	Chief Clerk of the United States State Department; August 28, 1845 – April 14, 1847	Succeeded by William S. Derrick
