= John Appleton =

American politician (1815–1864)

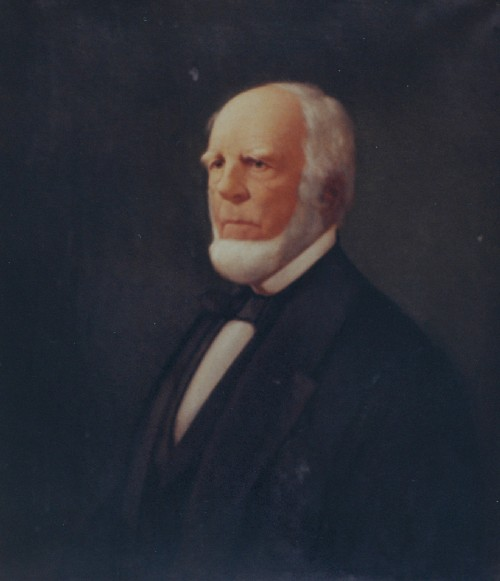
- John Appleton, before 1864

21st United States Ambassador to Russia
- In office September 9, 1860 – June 8, 1861
- Preceded by: Francis Wilkinson Pickens
- Succeeded by: Cassius Marcellus Clay

4th United States Assistant Secretary of State
- In office April 4, 1857 – June 10, 1860
- Preceded by: John Addison Thomas
- Succeeded by: William H. Trescot

Member of US House of Representatives from Maine's 2nd district
- In office March 4, 1851 – March 3, 1853
- Preceded by: Nathaniel Littlefield
- Succeeded by: Samuel Mayall

1st United States Ambassador to Bolivia
- In office January 3, 1849 – May 4, 1849
- Succeeded by: Alexander Keith McClung

18th Chief Clerk of the United States Department of State
- In office January 26, 1848 – April 15, 1848
- Preceded by: William S. Derrick
- Succeeded by: William S. Derrick

Personal details
- Born: February 11, 1815 Beverly, Massachusetts
- Died: August 22, 1864 (aged 49) Portland, Maine
- Resting place: Evergreen Cemetery; 43°40′54″N 70°18′4″W
- Citizenship: United States
- Party: Democratic
- Spouse: Susan Lovering Dodge (m. 1840–64)
- Relations: James Appleton (uncle)
- Children: Eben Dodge Appleton (b. 1843)
- Parent(s): John W. Appleton (1780–1862); Sophia Williams (1786–1860)
- Education: Bowdoin College (1834)
- Occupation: Politician, lawyer

John Appleton (February 11, 1815 – August 22, 1864) was an American lawyer, politician and diplomat who served as the United States' first chargé d'affaires to Bolivia, and later as special envoy to Great Britain and Russia. Born in Beverly, Massachusetts, Appleton graduated from Bowdoin College in 1834 and attended Harvard Law School from 1835 to 1836. On leaving Harvard, he became a barrister and newspaper editor while maintaining a vigorous involvement in Democratic politics. In 1840 he was appointed as registrar of probates for Cumberland County, Maine, and in 1845 became Chief Clerk for the United States Department of the Navy.

In January 1848 Appleton was promoted to Chief Clerk of the State Department, but resigned in March when he was named as the United States' first chargé d'affaires to Bolivia. The posting was unsuccessful, and Appleton resigned after six months service and returned to the United States to pursue his personal political interests. In 1851 he was narrowly elected to Congress, representing Maine's 2nd congressional district. As a Congressman he became noted for his oratorical skills, and was selected to give the obituary address for former Senator and Secretary of State Daniel Webster in 1852.

In 1855 Appleton was sent as diplomatic envoy to London, England to promote United States interests in negotiations to end the Crimean War. He returned to the United States in 1857 and was appointed as the fourth Assistant Secretary of State, a post he held for the following three years. As Assistant Secretary he opened discussions with Russia regarding a prospective Alaska Purchase, leading to the United States acquiring that territory in 1867. Concurrently, he was editor of a pro-Democratic newspaper The Washington Union, but his career was marred by allegations that he misused this position for personal gain. He was the United States' envoy to Russia from 1860 until his retirement in 1861. Appleton died on August 22, 1864, and is buried in Portland's Evergreen Cemetery.

== Early life: 1815–44 ==
John Appleton was born in Beverly, Massachusetts on February 11, 1815. His father, John White Appleton (1780–1862), was a resident of Portland, Maine; his mother, Sophia Appleton (nee Williams) (1786–1860) was from Connecticut. Appleton was the third child of nine of his parents and spent most of his childhood in Portland.

Appleton studied law at Bowdoin College in the 1830s, graduating as a Legum Doctor in 1834 and pursuing further studies at Harvard Law School in the summers of 1835 and 1836. Throughout the 1830s he worked in New England legal firms. On 20 June 1837 he passed his bar examination in Cumberland County, Maine and subsequently opened his own legal practice in Portland. In 1838 Appleton was appointed as lead editor of the Eastern Argus, a now-defunct newspaper serving the Portland area, and in 1840 and from 1842 to 1844 he served as registrar of probates for Cumberland County. He married Susan Lovering Dodge in 1840, and their only child, Eben Dodge Appleton, was born in Portland in 1843.

== Political career: 1845–64 ==
=== Chief Clerk ===
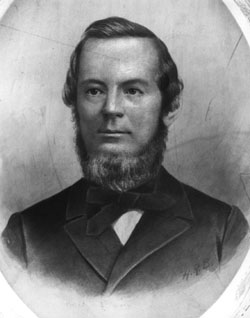
John Appleton as a young man.

In addition to his legal practice, Appleton's abiding interest was in Democratic Party politics. In the 1840s he became associated with Tennessee Governor James K. Polk, who would be elected President in a close-fought race in 1844. Following Polk's inauguration, Appleton accepted an offer from United States Navy Secretary George Bancroft to join the administration as the Navy's Chief Clerk. His closeness to Polk continued while in this role, culminating in an invitation to act as the President's personal diarist for a goodwill tour of the northeastern states. Appleton's record of this visit was later published as a 135-page volume entitled North for Union. The book includes Appleton's endorsement of northeastern arts and industry, alongside a studied disapproval of its urban culture. Boston is described as having a "greatness" bestowed by its role in the American Revolutionary War, which permitted Appleton to "almost forget its meanness" today. Industrialized Lowell is criticized for commercialism, as "not in such places are republican spirits and Spartan hearts best educated." Describing the region's largest city, Appleton wrote:

New York ... has the social faults which belong to an eminently business place, and to a shifting, moneymaking people. Everything there is confused, and every man there is busily pursuing some selfish aim. One who walks slowly in the streets is in danger of being run over, and everybody is so much in a hurry there that, in such a case, no resident would probably stop to pick him up.

On January 26, 1848, Appleton was promoted to the role of Chief Clerk for the Department of State. In this position, Appleton was the second-ranking officer of the department.

=== Chargé d'affaires to Bolivia ===
On March 30, 1848, then-Secretary of State James Buchanan appointed Appleton as United States chargé d'affaires to Bolivia, which had recently declared independence from Peru. His primary instructions were to open economic relations with Bolivia, assure them of United States' goodwill and help secure a cross-border treaty that would transfer the port of Arica from Peruvian to Bolivian control. Buchanan further urged Appleton to use his influence as chargé d'affaires to encourage Bolivia towards democracy, by "presenting to them the example of our own country, where all controversies are decided at the ballot box."

Appleton set out for his Bolivian post in the summer of 1848. However his arrival was delayed first by the shipwreck of the USS Onkahye, which had been carrying him to South America, and then by slow progress through the Andes Mountains en route to La Paz. In October he reached the Bolivian capital to discover that the government of President José Miguel de Velasco Franco was besieged by soldiers under the command of former Minister for War Manuel Isidoro Belzu. Both de Velasco and Belzu claimed to be head of state, but neither would receive Appleton in order that he might present his diplomatic credentials and assume office. Belzu's forces seized national control eight weeks later, and Appleton was able to take up his position as chargé in December.

Having finally taken office, Appleton found his posting a challenging one. In correspondence with the United States Government he noted that the country seemed to have a difficult climate, few North Americans and no roads. Attempts to deliver on Buchanan's instructions for a cross-border treaty with Peru were also rebuffed, as the Peruvian Government had not been advised that Appleton would be undertaking this task and declined to negotiate with him. Discontented and in poor health, Appleton requested that he be recalled to the United States. He resigned on May 4, 1849, less than six months after assuming his post.

=== Election to Congress ===
When God shall send his angel to us, Mr. Speaker, bearing the scroll of death, may we be able to bow our heads to his mission with as much gentleness and resignation as marked by the last hours of Daniel Webster.

— John Appleton, on the death of Daniel Webster

Appleton returned to Maine in late 1849 and resumed his interests in a political career. On March 4, 1851, he was elected to the 32nd United States Congress as the Democratic candidate in Maine's 2nd congressional district, defeating Whig candidate William Ferguson by 40 votes.

Despite the failures of his Bolivian post, Appleton continued his interest in international relations by taking up a position on the House Committee on Foreign Affairs. His focus was now on European affairs, taking a conservative line against international republicanism and political reform which he felt was motivated by emotion rather than reason. For Appleton, European republican sentiment was "like the fabled Phaeton, [who] seizes the reins with passion, drives madly off the course, and nearly engulfs the world in darkness." The new Congressman also demonstrated a talent for oratory, delivering a series of speeches noted for their graceful, impressive delivery. His speaking skills were recognized in December 1852 when he was chosen by Congress to read the obituary address for former Senator and Secretary of State Daniel Webster.

=== Envoy to London ===
Appleton declined to run for re-election to Congress in 1852. Instead he returned to Maine, and in February 1855 was appointed as diplomatic envoy to London, England, with instructions to lead United States engagement in negotiations to end the Crimean War. He resigned his position on November 16, 1855, having held it for 271 days. Appleton was subsequently nominated as United States chargé d'affaires in London, but declined the position and returned home to assist James Buchanan's Presidential campaign.

=== Assistant Secretary of State, Envoy to Russia ===
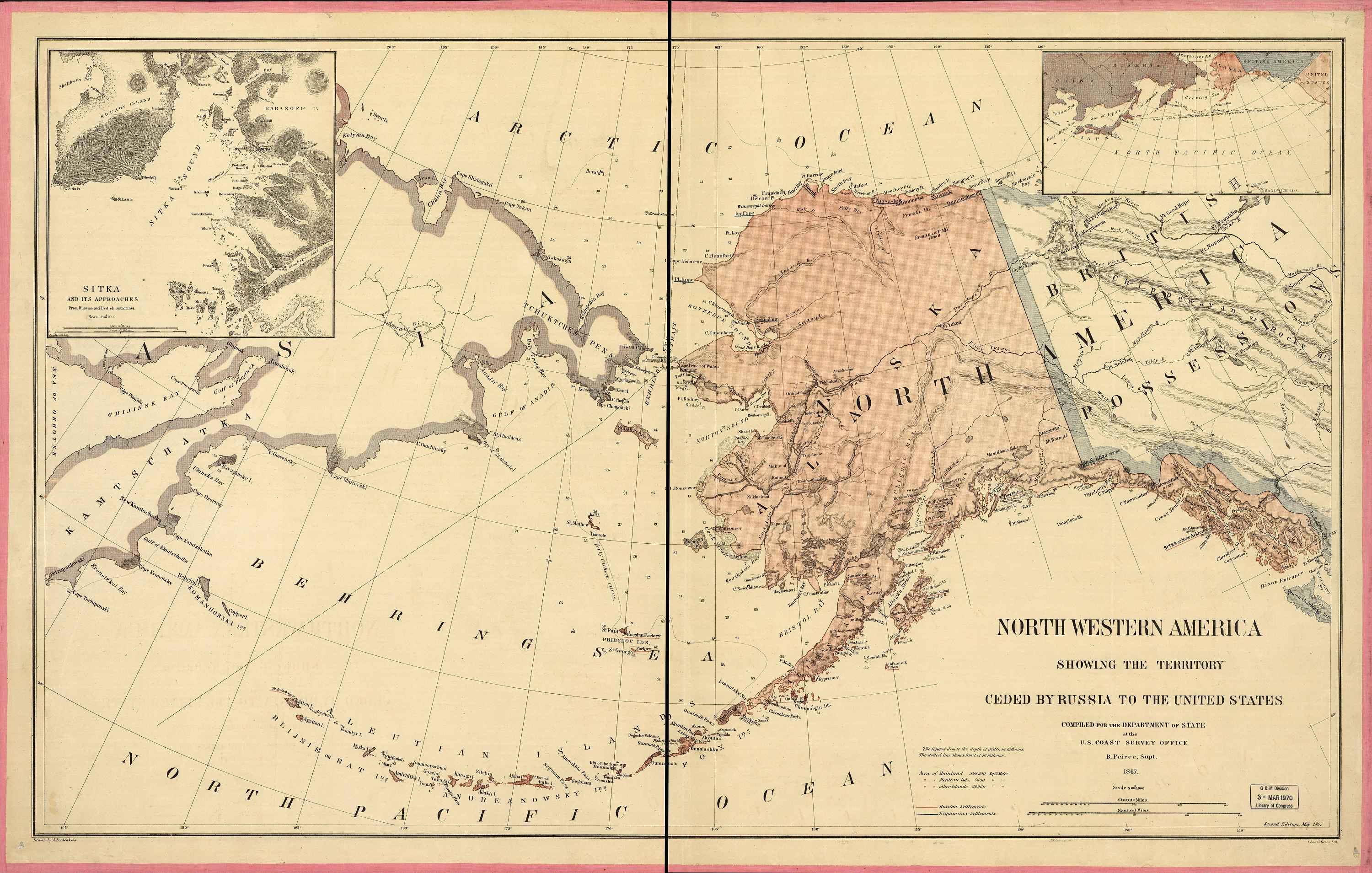
The Department of Alaska, which John Appleton was trying to purchase for the United States

After Buchanan's inauguration in 1857, Appleton was nominated by Edmund Burke to run a pro-Buchanan newspaper, the Washington Union. After a few months, Appleton resigned due to ill health. On April 4, 1857, he was nominated as United States Assistant Secretary of State. Appleton superseded the Chief Clerk as the second-ranking officer of the department. In 1858, Appleton was charged with corruption from his involvement in the "public printing plunder", in which he used his influence and his position as editor to make around $10,000 ($372,000 in 2025). Appleton did not deny the charges.

While in office he was involved in preliminary discussions with Tsarist Russia over the prospective Alaska Purchase. Talks were held in Washington between Appleton, Russian representative Eduard de Stoeckl and chairman of the U.S. Senate Committee on Naval Affairs William M. Gwin. Appleton and Gwin offered $5 million ($180 million in 2025) in 1859, but de Stoeck wanted more money. No decision had been made before the 1860 Presidential election, and discussion was then indefinitely postponed upon the outbreak of the American Civil War.

Appleton resigned as Assistant Secretary of State on June 10, 1860. On September 9 he was appointed as diplomatic envoy to Russia. Appleton showed impatience with the rise of Congress Poland. When he commented back to the United States, not much was done, since the rise of the Confederate States. During meetings with Prince Gortchacow in April 1861, Appleton and Gortchacow concluded Russia would not recognize the Confederacy, however, trade between the two would still remain. Appleton retired for health reasons on June 8, 1861.

== Death ==
Appleton died on August 22, 1864. He is buried in Portland's Evergreen Cemetery.

== Notes ==
U.S. House of Representatives
Preceded by Nathaniel Littlefield	Member of the U.S. House of Representatives from Maine's 2nd congressional district March 4, 1853 – March 3, 1855	Succeeded by Samuel Mayall
Diplomatic posts
New title	United States Ambassador to Bolivia; March 30, 1848 – May 4, 1849	Succeeded by Alexander Keith McClung
Preceded by Unknown	United States Secretary of Legation to England; February 1855 – November 16, 1855	Succeeded by Unknown
Preceded by Francis Wilkinson Pickens	United States Ambassador to Russia; June 8, 1860 – June 8, 1861	Succeeded by Cassius Marcellus Clay
Political offices
Preceded by Unknown	Chief Clerk of the United States Department of the Navy; 1844–1848	Succeeded by Unknown
Preceded by William S. Derrick	Chief Clerk of the United States State Department; January 26, 1848 – April 25, 1848	Succeeded by William S. Derrick
Preceded by John Addison Thomas	United States Assistant Secretary of State; April 4, 1857 – June 10, 1860	Succeeded by William Henry Trescot
Media offices
Preceded by Unknown	Lead editor of The Eastern Argus; 1838 – c. 1842–43	Succeeded by Unknown
Preceded by Unknown	Lead editor of The Washington Union; 1857 – before 1860	Succeeded by Unknown
