= 12th Massachusetts Infantry Regiment =

12th Regiment Massachusetts Volunteer Infantry
- Reconstruction of the National flag of the regiment
- Active: June 14, 1861 – July 8, 1864
- Country: United States of America
- Allegiance: Union
- Branch: Union Army
- Type: Infantry
- Size: Approx. 1,522 men at muster
- Part of: In 1863: 2nd Brigade (Baxter's), 2nd Division (Robinson's), I Corps, Army of the Potomac
- Nickname: "Webster Regiment"

Commanders
- Notable commanders: Colonel Fletcher Webster; Colonel (later Brigadier General) James L. Bates

Insignia
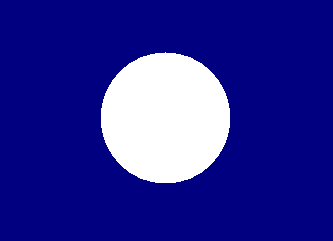
- I Corps badge (2nd Division)

The 12th Regiment Massachusetts Volunteer Infantry was an infantry regiment in the Union Army during the American Civil War. Formed on June 14, 1861, in Boston, Massachusetts, it was nicknamed the "Webster Regiment" after its first colonel, Colonel Fletcher Webster, son of U.S. Senator Daniel Webster.

== Organization and early duty ==
Recruitment began in April 1861 under Col. Fletcher Webster. Massachusetts Governor John Albion Andrew initially designated most volunteers to existing militia regiments, delaying full muster of the 12th until mid-June. Training commenced at Fort Warren in Boston Harbor, where the regiment received its colors on July 19, 1861, in a review on Boston Common. Two companies, organized via the town of Acton, were mustered in immediately, and the remainder joined over the following weeks. On July 23, the 12th Massachusetts departed Boston for Washington, D.C.

Initially assigned to the Army of the Shenandoah under Maj. Gen. Nathaniel P. Banks, the regiment spent the remainder of 1861 on picket and guard duty around Frederick, Maryland and along the upper Potomac River. Disease was a significant threat in winter quarters: by December 31, a quarter of its enlisted men had been hospitalized with measles or dysentery.

Quartermaster-Sergeant George E. Muzzey's flag

== 1862 Campaigns ==
=== Valley Operations and Front Royal ===
In early 1862, the 12th Massachusetts joined Brig. Gen. John Abercrombie's brigade in Maj. Gen. Banks's V Corps. In March, it moved into the Shenandoah Valley and engaged in reconnaissance near Front Royal and Winchester. On April 18, the regiment exchanged sporadic fire across the Rappahannock River with Confederate pickets, its first combat. By June, the unit was part of Maj. Gen. Irvin McDowell's forces near Warrenton.

=== Cedar Mountain and Second Bull Run ===
Attached to Brig. Gen. Hartsuff's brigade of Maj. Gen. McClellan's I Corps, the 12th Massachusetts moved toward Culpeper Court House in July. During the Battle of Cedar Mountain on August 9, 1862, the regiment arrived late and suffered minor artillery casualties. On August 30, Col. Fletcher Webster was mortally wounded near Bald Hill; the regiment sustained 25 killed or mortally wounded that day. Lt. Col. James L. Bates assumed command following Webster's death.

=== South Mountain and Antietam ===
After reorganizing in September 1862 under Maj. Gen. Joseph Hooker's I Corps, the 12th Massachusetts joined Hartsuff's brigade, 1st Division, I Corps. On September 14, at the Battle of South Mountain (Turner's Gap), the regiment helped assault Confederate defenses. Casualties were relatively light—18 wounded out of 300 engaged.

At the Battle of Antietam on September 17, 1862, the 12th Massachusetts fought in Hartsuff's brigade during the morning push into the Miller's Cornfield. The regiment lost 224 of 334 men engaged—67 percent of its strength—the highest percentage loss of any Union regiment that day. It captured the colors of the 1st Texas Infantry but withdrew under heavy fire. Both Bates and several junior officers were wounded; command fell to Captain David A. Jones until the fighting subsided.

=== Fredericksburg and Chancellorsville ===
After rebuilding, the 12th Massachusetts joined Brig. Gen. Henry Baxter's 2nd Brigade, Maj. Gen. John C. Robinson's 2nd Division, I Corps. At the Battle of Fredericksburg (December 13, 1862), it assaulted the heights near Marye's Heights, suffering 37 killed, 94 wounded, and 30 missing. During the Battle of Chancellorsville (May 1–4, 1863), the regiment held reserve positions along the Rappahannock and incurred fewer than twenty casualties. Command passed to Lt. Col. Jones after Bates was wounded again on May 3.

== 1863 Campaigns ==
On June 10, 1863, the 12th Massachusetts left camp near Stafford, Virginia, for the Gettysburg Campaign. Arriving July 1, it deployed on Oak Ridge as part of Baxter's brigade. In fierce fighting against Iverson's North Carolina Brigade, the regiment lost 5 killed, 52 wounded, and 62 missing out of 301 men—nearly 40 percent casualties. Lt. Col. Jones was taken prisoner; command fell to Major Andrew Bulkeley on July 2–3.

After Gettysburg, the 12th Massachusetts pursued Confederate forces through Maryland and joined the Mine Run Campaign in late November 1863, suffering no significant losses before wintering near Culpeper Court House.

== 1864 Campaigns and muster out ==
During the Overland Campaign, the 12th Massachusetts, as part of Robinson's division in VI Corps, fought at the Battle of the Wilderness (May 5–7) along the Orange Turnpike and at the Battle of Spotsylvania Court House (May 8–12) around the Bloody Angle. It suffered heavy casualties—42 killed, 98 wounded, 53 missing—out of roughly 250 engaged. On May 23, the regiment took part in the North Anna River engagement; on June 1 at Cold Harbor, it spiked several Confederate guns under fire.

In the early stages of the Siege of Petersburg, it saw skirmishing near Petersburg's outer defenses. By June 25, the regiment's three-year enlistments had expired. Those men who re-enlisted transferred to the 39th Massachusetts Infantry Regiment, and the remainder marched back to Boston, arriving July 1. The 12th Massachusetts was officially mustered out on July 8, 1864.

== Casualties ==
Over its service, the 12th Massachusetts mustered 1,522 men. Total casualties included:

- Killed or mortally wounded: 18 officers, 175 enlisted men
- Died of disease: 83 enlisted men
- Total losses: 276 men

== Commanders ==
- Colonel Fletcher Webster (mortal wounding August 30, 1862, at Second Bull Run)
- Colonel James L. Bates (promoted after Webster's death; breveted brigadier general)
- Lieutenant Colonel David A. Jones (commanded at Antietam and Gettysburg after Bates was wounded)
- Major Andrew Bulkeley (commanded July 2–3, 1863, at Gettysburg)

== Notable members ==
- Private John Edward Gilman (Company E), 40th Commander-in-Chief of the Grand Army of the Republic (1910–11)
- Surgeon Jedediah Hyde Baxter, later served as Surgeon General of the U.S. Army

== Monuments and legacy ==
- Manassas National Battlefield Park, Virginia: Memorial to Col. Fletcher Webster at site of his mortal wounding.
- Gettysburg National Military Park, Pennsylvania: Granite "Minnie Ball" monument on Oak Ridge marks the 12th Massachusetts's position July 1–3, 1863; features a relief of Daniel Webster's profile.
- Massachusetts State House Archives: Regimental colors are preserved in Boston, symbolizing the unit's sacrifices at Antietam.

The 12th Massachusetts's 67 percent casualty rate at Antietam remains the highest among Union regiments in that battle, and its stand in the Cornfield exemplifies the regiment's gallantry under fire.

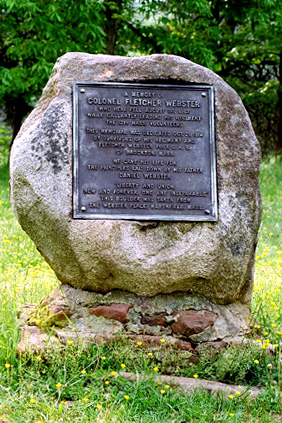
Fletcher Webster memorial
