= Lewis Cass Jr. =

American diplomat

Minister Resident Lewis Cass Jr.
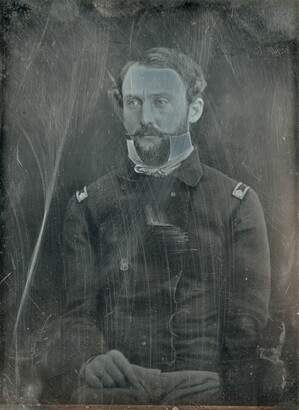
- Cass circa 1847

1st United States Minister to the Papal States
- In office November 19, 1849 – November 27, 1858
- President: Zachary Taylor; Millard Fillmore; Franklin Pierce; James Buchanan
- Preceded by: Jacob L. Martin
- Succeeded by: John P. Stockton

Personal details
- Born: 1814
- Died: January 27, 1878 (aged 63–64) Paris, France
- Parents: Lewis Cass (father); Elizabeth Cass (mother)

Lewis Cass Jr. (1814 – January 27, 1878) was an American diplomat of the United States to the Papal States.

== Biography ==
Cass Jr. was born to Lewis Cass, Sr. and Elizabeth Cass in 1814. In March 1847 he was made a major in the dragoons. The following December, he was appointed acting inspector general to Brigadier General John E. Wool. His unit was disbanded in July 1848.

On December 12, 1848 President James K. Polk nominated Cass "...to be Chargé d'affaires of the United States to the Papal States, in the place of Jacob L. Martin, deceased". Having heard from the Committee on Foreign Relations on December 18, and after debate the next day, the senate voted to adjourn. Subsequent motions to table the matter or postpone it indefinitely were defeated. The nomination finally passed on January 4, 1849.

Cass began serving as the second Chargé d'affaires to the Papal States in 1849, a year after his father's candidacy for the presidency; He succeeded Jacob L. Martin, who died in Rome in August 1848.

Cass held the position until his promotion to the newly created title of Minister resident in 1854. He would remain the U.S. representative to the Papal States until 1858. On February 25, 1856, he was nominated to serve as Envoy Extraordinary and Minister Plenipotentiary to the Holy See, but the nomination was withdrawn.

During his service, Cass was forced to deal with the revolutionary Roman Republic of 1849, which saw Pope Pius IX fleeing Rome. Then Secretary of State James Buchanan would instruct him to hold off from approaching either the Holy See or the revolutionary government and instead help the U.S. to determine to whom it should send him as representative. He would also be contacted by Cardinal Antonelli to discuss the mission of then Archbishop Bedini to examine the status of the Catholic Church in the United States. His role during the revolution and handling of archbishop Bedini, would eventually earn him criticism domestically, especially from Catholic Americans.

Cass Jr. would die in Paris on January 27, 1878, without any children. A porcelain breakfast set formerly belonging to Napoleon Bonaparte, and gifted to Cass by the Emperor's nephew, Charles Lucien Bonaparte, Prince de Canino, later came into the possession of Cass's nephew, Augustus Cass Canfield.

== See also ==
- List of ambassadors of the United States to the Holy See
