= William Henry Trescot =

American politician (1822–1898)

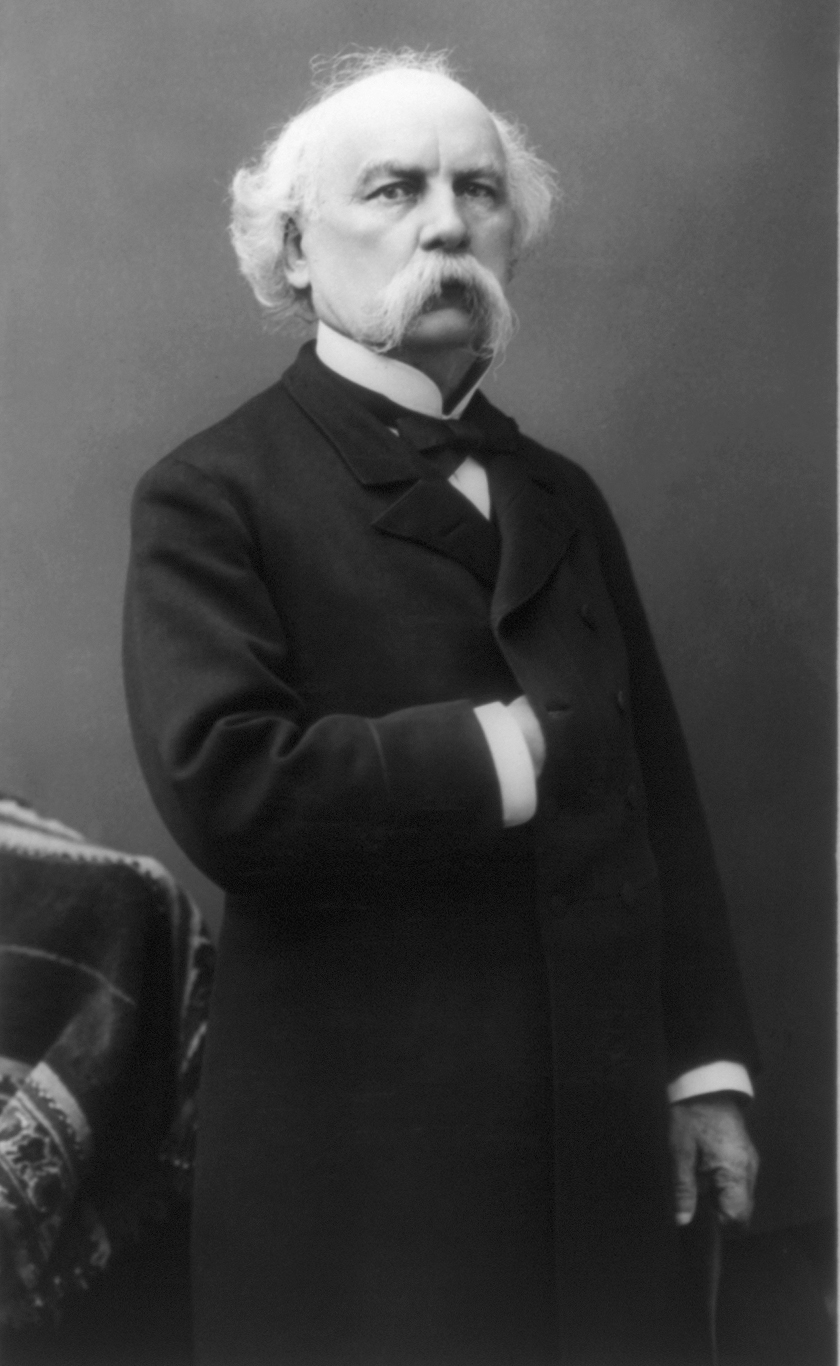

5th United States Assistant Secretary of State
- In office June 8, 1860 – December 20, 1860
- Preceded by: John Appleton
- Succeeded by: Frederick W. Seward

Personal details
- Born: November 10, 1822 Charleston, South Carolina, U.S.
- Died: May 4, 1898 (aged 75) Pendleton, South Carolina, U.S.
- Party: Democratic
- Profession: Lawyer, Politician

William Henry Trescot (November 10, 1822 – May 4, 1898) was a Charleston lawyer, historian, and diplomat born in Charleston, South Carolina, on November 10, 1822. He graduated at College of Charleston in 1840, studied law at Harvard University, and was admitted to the bar in 1843. He was married to Eliza Natalie Cuthbert, whose family held land originally granted by King George II.

He was a close student of American foreign policy. From 1852 to 1854 he was secretary of the U.S. legation in London. In June 1860 he was appointed Assistant Secretary of State, and he was Acting Secretary of State in June–October, during General Lewis Cass's absence from Washington, and for a few days in December after Cass's resignation. His position was important, as the only South Carolinian holding anything like official rank, because of his intimacy with President James Buchanan, and his close relations with the secession leaders in South Carolina.

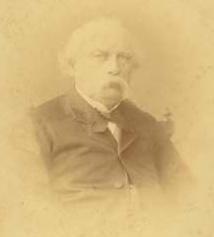
William Henry Trescot

He opposed the reinforcement of Fort Sumter, used his influence to prevent any attack on the fort by South Carolina before the meeting of the state's convention called to consider the question of secession, and became the special agent of South Carolina in Washington after his resignation from his position as United States Assistant Secretary of State in December. When he returned to Charleston in February 1861, he played a leading role in the negotiations surrounding the Charleston forts. He was a member of the state legislature in 1862–1866, and served as colonel on the staff of General Roswell S. Ripley during the Civil War; and later returned to Washington.

He was counsel for the United States before the Halifax Fisheries Commission in 1877; was commissioner for the revision of the treaty with China in 1880; was minister to Chile in 1881 and 1882; in 1882 with General Ulysses S. Grant negotiated a commercial treaty with Mexico; and in 1889-1890 was a delegate to the Pan-American Congress in Washington. He died at Pendleton, South Carolina, his country place, on 4 May 1898.

In the opinion of historian David Saville Muzzey, Trescot was "one of the most accomplished diplomats in our history."

== Works ==
- The Diplomacy of the Revolution (1852)
- An American View of the Eastern Question (1854)
- The Diplomatic History of the Administrations of Washington and Adams (1857)
- Memorial of the life of J. Johnston Pettigrew: Brigadier General of the Confederate States Army (1870)

Political offices
Preceded by John Appleton	United States Assistant Secretary of State; 1860	Succeeded by Frederick W. Seward
