= Aaron Vail =

American diplomat

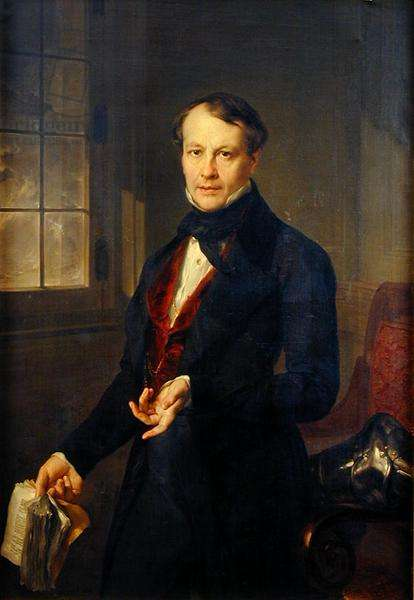

Chargé d'Affaires of the United States to Spain
- In office May 20, 1840 – August 1, 1842
- President: Martin Van Buren; William Henry Harrison; John Tyler
- Preceded by: John H. Eaton
- Succeeded by: Washington Irving

10th Chief Clerk of the Department of State
- In office June 26, 1838 – July 15, 1840
- President: Martin Van Buren
- Preceded by: Aaron Ogden Dayton
- Succeeded by: Jacob L. Martin

Chargé d'Affaires of the United States to the United Kingdom
- In office July 13, 1832 – July 13, 1836
- President: Andrew Jackson
- Preceded by: Martin Van Buren
- Succeeded by: Andrew Stevenson

Personal details
- Born: October 26, 1796 Lorient, France
- Died: November 4, 1878 (aged 82) Pau, France
- Spouse: Emilie Salles

Aaron Vail (October 26, 1796 – November 4, 1878) was an American diplomat who served as chargé d'affaires in the United Kingdom and Spain in the 1830s and 1840s.

== Biography ==
He was born in Lorient, France, where his father, Aaron Vail (1758–1813), a prominent businessman and merchant from New York was serving as U.S. consul and commercial agent. Vail's French mother brought the Vail family to the United States after the senior Aaron Vail's death, and they resided in Washington, D.C.

The younger Aaron Vail was educated in Washington and became a clerk in the Department of State. In 1831 Martin Van Buren selected Vail to be the secretary of the U.S. legation in London; when Van Buren's appointment as Minister was rejected by the United States Senate, Vail acted as chargé d'affaires, from April 4, 1832, until 1836.

Vail served as a Special Diplomatic Agent to Canada in 1838.

From May 20, 1840, to August 1, 1842, Vail served as chargé d'affaires in Spain, remaining in the post until the arrival of Washington Irving to serve as Minister. After returning to the United States, Vail served for several years as the State Department's chief clerk, its top non-political appointment. He later lived in New York City; while in retirement, he declined diplomatic posts offered by Franklin Pierce and James Buchanan. He later moved to Paris, and died in Pau in 1878.

== Family ==
Vail's brothers included: Eugene, a State Department employee; Edward, an officer in the United States Navy; and Jefferson, an officer in the United States Army.

In 1835, Vail married Emilie Salles of New York City; they were the parents of a son, Aaron Vail II, and a daughter, Emilie, who was the wife of Henry C. Bradshaw.

== Notes ==
Diplomatic posts
Preceded by John H. Eaton	Chargé d'Affaires of the United States to Spain; 1840–1842	Succeeded by Washington Irving
Preceded by Martin Van Buren	Chargé d'Affaires of the United States to the United Kingdom; 1832–1836	Succeeded by Andrew Stevenson
Government offices
Preceded by Aaron Ogden Dayton	Chief Clerk of the Department of State; 1838-1840	Succeeded by Jacob L. Martin
