= Jacob L. Martin =

American diplomat

11th Chief Clerk of the U.S. State Department
- In office July 16, 1840 – March 5, 1841
- President: Martin Van Buren; William Henry Harrison
- Preceded by: Aaron Vail
- Succeeded by: Daniel F. Webster

Acting United States Secretary of State
- In office March 4, 1841 – March 5, 1841
- President: William Henry Harrison
- Preceded by: John Forsyth
- Succeeded by: Daniel Webster

Chargé d'affaires of the United States to the Papal States
- In office August 19, 1848 – August 26, 1848
- President: James Polk
- Preceded by: Office established
- Succeeded by: Lewis Cass, Jr.

Personal details
- Born: unknown unknown
- Died: August 26, 1848 Rome, Papal States (now Italy)
- Resting place: Protestant Cemetery, Rome
- Party: Unknown

Jacob L. Martin (died August 26, 1848) was an American diplomat. He held the post of Chief Clerk of the U.S. State Department from July 16, 1840, to March 5, 1841. For just two days, March 4 and March 5, 1841, he held the ad interim chair of the United States Secretary of State.

In 1848 he was appointed chargé d'affaires of the United States to the Holy See. Martin, a Protestant, was chosen over a few candidates who were openly friendly to Vatican. He reached Rome on August 2, 1848, but hesitated to enter the city owing to continuing revolution. Martin presented his credentials to the Holy See on August 19, 1848, but died seven days later and was buried in the city's Protestant Cemetery.

Preceded by Aaron Vail	Chief Clerk of the United States State Department; July 16, 1840 – March 5, 1841	Succeeded by Daniel Fletcher Webster
