= William S. Derrick =

American politician (1802–1852)

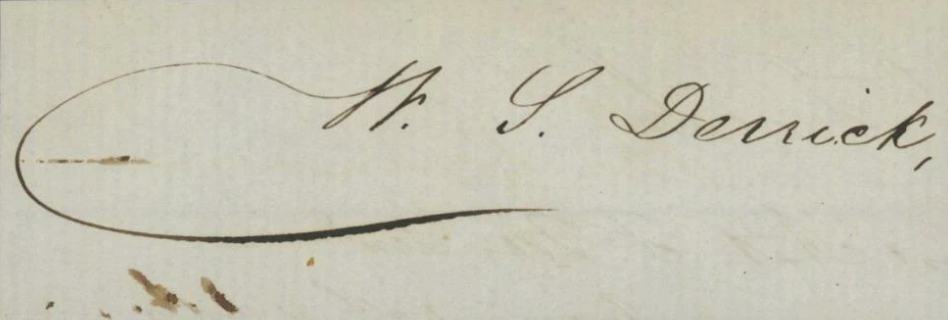
Signature of William S. Derrick

William Sharples Derrick (July 31, 1802 – May 15, 1852) was an American politician from Pennsylvania. He held the post of Chief Clerk of the U.S. State Department four distinct times in the 1840s and 1850s. He held the post of Secretary of State ad interim for three days in 1843 (June 21 to June 23).

Political offices
Preceded by Daniel Fletcher Webster	Chief Clerk of the United States State Department; April 24, 1843 – April 9, 1844	Succeeded by Richard K. Cralle
Preceded by Richard K. Cralle	Chief Clerk of the United States State Department; March 11, 1845 – August 27, 1845	Succeeded by Nicholas Trist
Preceded by Nicholas Trist	Chief Clerk of the United States State Department; April 15, 1847 – January 25, 1848	Succeeded by John Appleton
Preceded by John Appleton	Chief Clerk of the United States State Department; April 25, 1848 – May 15, 1852	Succeeded by William Hunter
