= Fletcher Webster =

American diplomat and Union Army officer

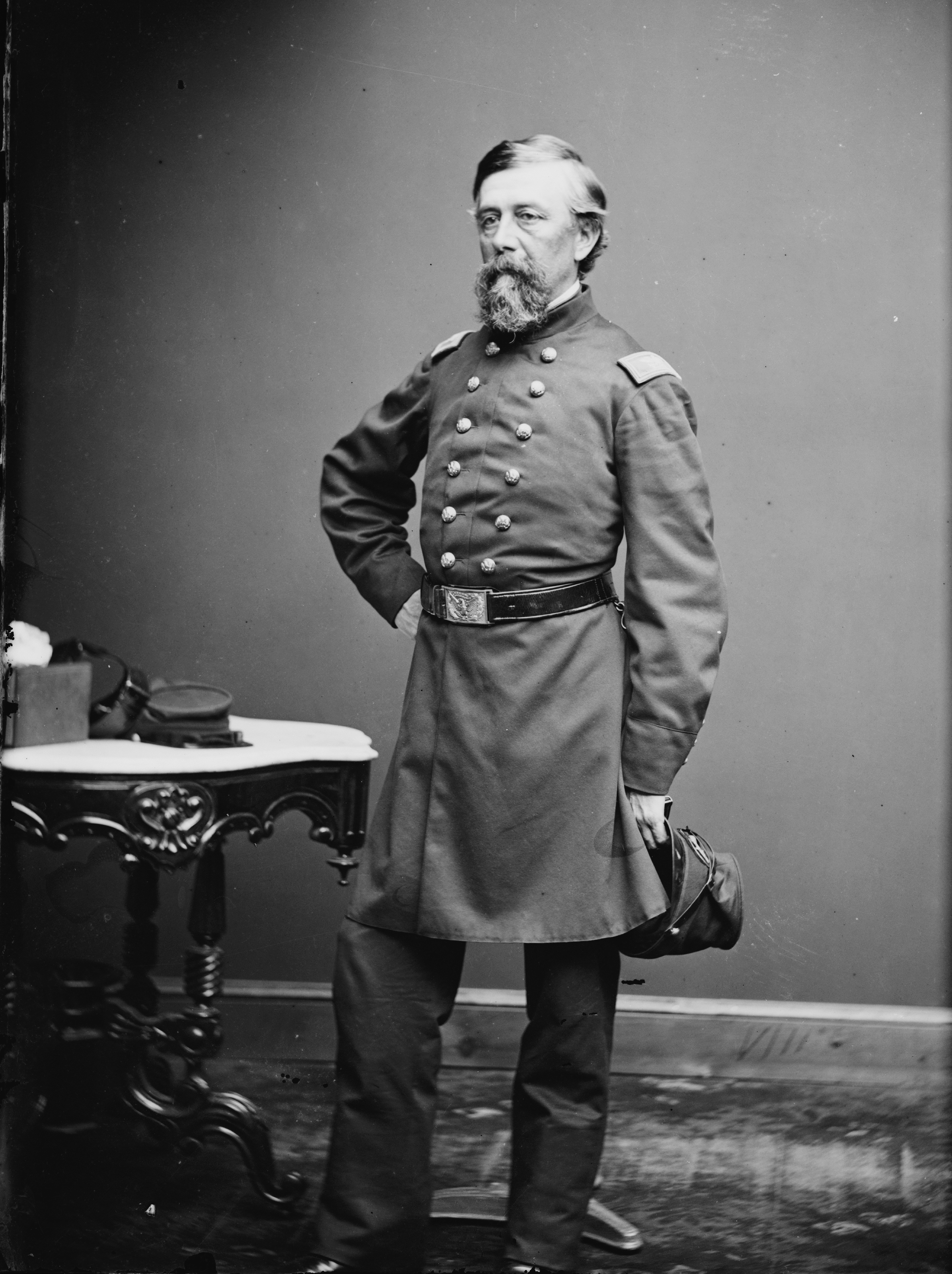
- Fletcher Webster as a Colonel in the Union Army

12th Chief Clerk of the Department of State
- In office March 6, 1841 – April 23, 1843
- President: William Henry Harrison; John Tyler
- Preceded by: Jacob L. Martin
- Succeeded by: William S. Derrick

Personal details
- Born: Daniel Fletcher Webster; July 25, 1813 Portsmouth, New Hampshire, U.S.
- Died: August 30, 1862 (aged 49) Prince William County, Virginia
- Cause of death: Died of wounds
- Spouse: Caroline S. White
- Parent: Daniel Webster (father)
- Education: Harvard College

Military service
- Allegiance: United States
- Branch/service: United States Army (Union Army)
- Years of service: 1861-62
- Rank: Colonel
- Commands: 12th Massachusetts Volunteer Infantry
- Battles/wars: Second Battle of Bull Run (DOW)

Daniel Fletcher Webster (July 25, 1813 – August 30, 1862) was an American diplomat and Union Army officer. He was the son of Daniel Webster, the 14th and 19th U.S. Secretary of State.

== Biography ==
The son of Daniel Webster and Grace Fletcher Webster, Fletcher graduated from Boston Latin School circa 1829 and from Harvard College in 1833.

During his father's first term as Secretary of State, Fletcher served as Chief Clerk of the United States State Department which, at the time, was the second most powerful office in the State Department. As chief clerk, he delivered the news of President William Henry Harrison's death to the new president, John Tyler.

Fletcher Webster married Caroline S. White on November 11, 1836. They raised two sons, Daniel (April 1840 – 2 September 1865) and Ashburton (7 December 1847 – 7 February 1879), and four daughters but three died in childhood. His third daughter Caroline W. Webster (24 October 1845 – 16 August 1884) married James Geddes Day.

During the Civil War, Webster served as colonel of the 12th Massachusetts Volunteer Infantry. The unit was known in the Army of the Potomac as "The Webster Regiment" in honor of their commander. While reinforcing Union forces attempting to repel Longstreet's counterattack, Webster was mortally wounded on Chinn Ridge in defense of Henry House Hill in the Second Battle of Bull Run on August 30, 1862.

== Legacy ==
A memorial boulder stands in Manassas National Battlefield Park in Colonel Webster's honor. A memorial to the Webster Regiment stands in Gettysburg National Park. He is also memorialized on the marble PRO PATRIA shield in the lobby of the Boston Latin School.

== Bibliography ==
- Brief of Fletcher Webster

Government offices
Preceded by Jacob L. Martin	Chief Clerk of the United States State Department; March 6, 1841 – April 23, 1843	Succeeded by William S. Derrick
