= John Graham (diplomat) =

American politician and diplomat (1774–1820)

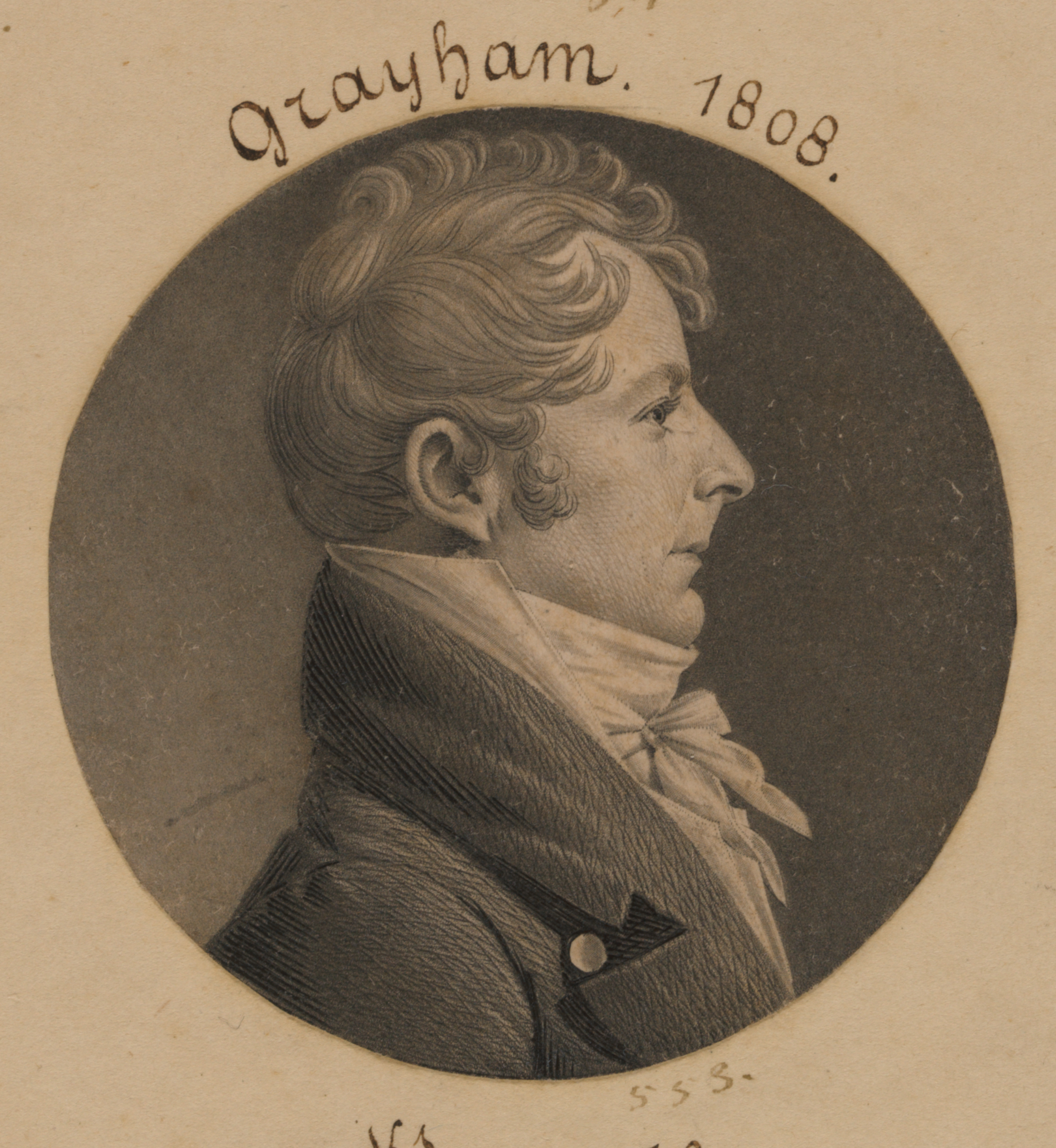

United States Minister to Portugal
- In office June 24, 1819 – June 13, 1820
- President: James Monroe
- Preceded by: Thomas Sumter Jr.
- Succeeded by: John James Appleton

Acting United States Secretary of State
- In office March 4, 1817 – March 9, 1817
- President: James Monroe
- Preceded by: James Monroe
- Succeeded by: Richard Rush

Chief Clerk of the United States Department of State
- In office July 1, 1807 – July 18, 1817
- Leader: James Madison; Robert Smith; James Monroe
- Preceded by: Jacob Wagner
- Succeeded by: Daniel Brent

Personal details
- Born: 1774 Dumfries, Virginia, British America
- Died: August 6, 1820 (aged 45–46) Washington, D.C., U.S.
- Education: Columbia University

John Graham (1774 – August 6, 1820) was an American politician and diplomat. He was born in Dumfries, Virginia, and graduated from Columbia University in 1790. He moved to Kentucky and served in the Kentucky legislature.

From 1801 to 1803 he served as secretary and chargé d'affaires in the U.S. legation to Spain.

Graham was chief clerk of the State Department from 1807 to 1817 and as such was acting United States Secretary of State for five days, from March 4 to March 9, 1817, at the start of the administration of President James Monroe. Along with Caesar Augustus Rodney and Theodorick Bland, Graham was selected by Monroe in 1817 as one of three commissioners for a special diplomatic mission to South America, the South American Commission of 1817-1818. He served as the U.S. Minister to Portugal at Rio de Janeiro from June 24, 1819, to June 13, 1820.

He died in Washington, D.C., on August 6, 1820. His brother, George Graham, was acting Secretary of War under Presidents Madison and Monroe.
