= Daniel Brent =

American politician and diplomat (1770–1841)

Acting United States Secretary of State
- In office March 4, 1825 – March 7, 1825
- Preceded by: John Quincy Adams
- Succeeded by: Henry Clay

Personal details
- Born: 1770 Stafford County, Virginia, British America
- Died: January 31, 1841 (aged 70-71) Paris, France

Daniel Carroll Brent (1770 – January 31, 1841) was an American politician and diplomat. He was acting United States Secretary of State for a three-day period from March 4 to March 7, 1825 due to the transition of John Quincy Adams from Secretary of State to President. He served as Chief Clerk for the United States Department of State, succeeding John Graham on September 22, 1817, and remained in that position until August 22, 1833, serving under presidents James Monroe, John Quincy Adams and Andrew Jackson. After leaving the position, he served as U.S. Consul to Paris until his death in 1841.

As consul general, Brent helped arranged the burial of Eliza Monroe Hay, daughter of James Monroe, in the Père Lachaise Cemetery.

Brent was born in Stafford County, Virginia and died in Paris, France.
