= List of ambassadors of the United States to Russia =

Ambassador of the United States of America to the Russian Federation
- Посол Соединëнных Штатов в России
- Seal of the United States Department of State

- Flag of a United States ambassador

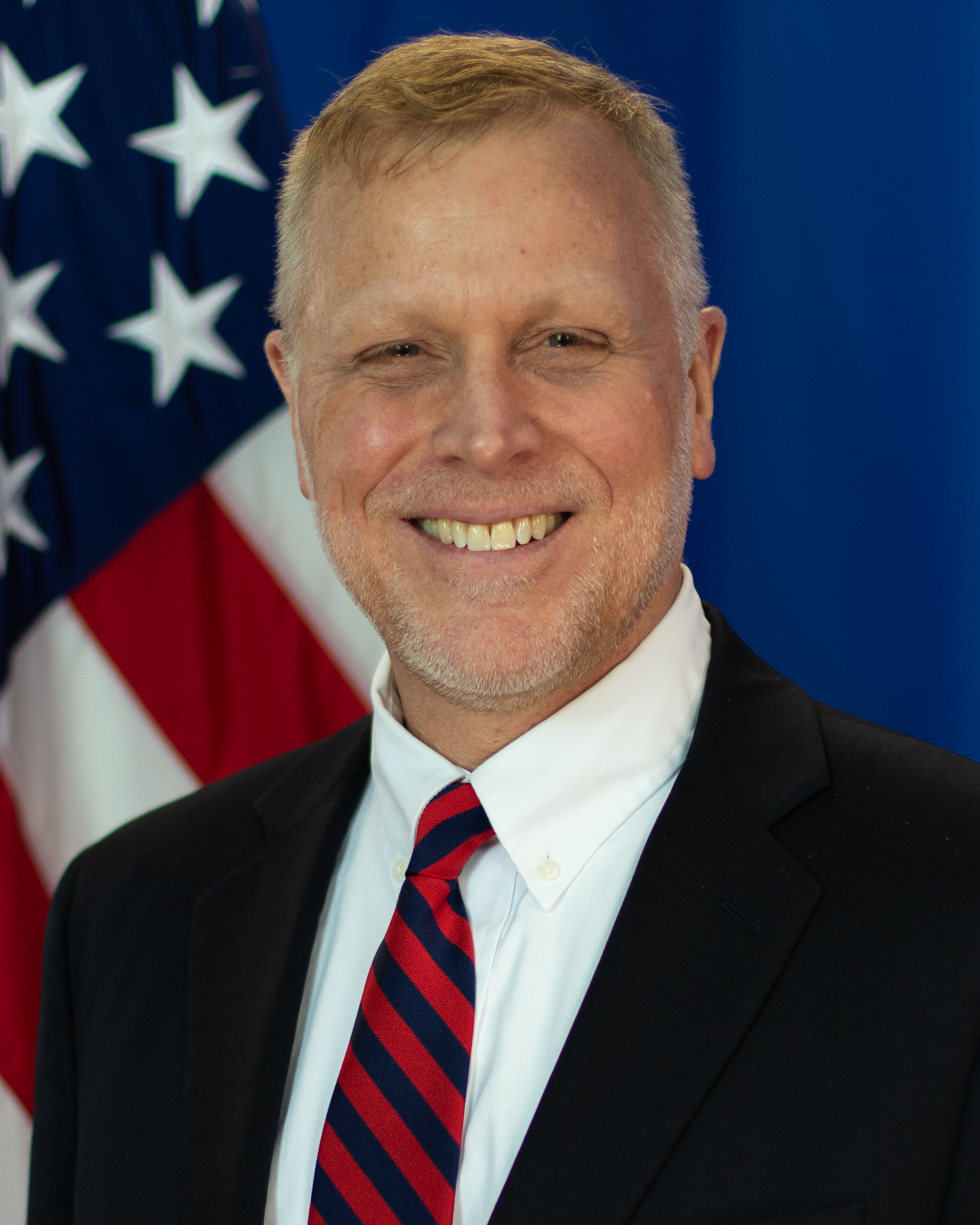
- Incumbent; J. Douglas Dykhouse; Chargé d'affaires ad interim since June 27, 2025
- Residence: Spaso House
- Nominator: President of the United States
- Appointer: President of the United States; with Senate advice and consent
- Inaugural holder: Francis Dana as Ambassador
- Formation: December 19, 1789; 236 years ago
- Website: U.S. Embassy in Moscow

The ambassador of the United States of America to the Russian Federation is the ambassador extraordinary and plenipotentiary from the United States of America to the Russian Federation. From January 30, 2023, to June 27, 2025, Lynne M. Tracy served as the ambassador extraordinary and plenipotentiary. The position is currently vacant, but J. Douglas Dykhouse is serving in an ad interim capacity.

== History ==
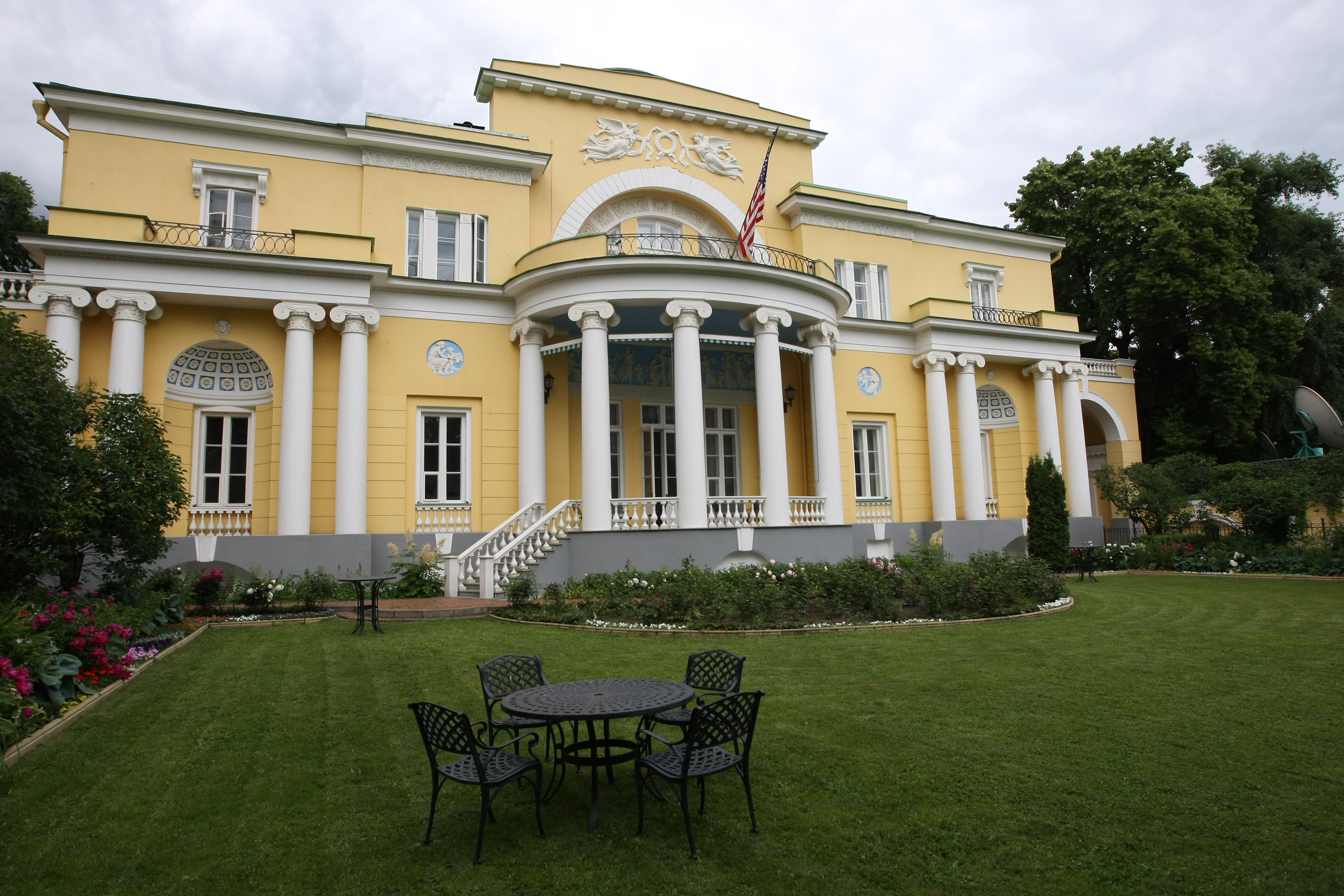
The Ambassador resides in Spaso House, the former mansion of Nikolay Vtorov.

The United States first established diplomatic relations with the Russian Empire in 1780. Diplomatic relations were broken off in 1917 when the Bolsheviks seized power, and they were not reestablished until 1933. From 1933 to 1991, the United States recognized the Soviet Union. After the collapse of the Soviet Union in 1991, the ambassador's title was changed to Ambassador to the Russian Federation, as Russia is the USSR's direct successor.

== List of ambassadors ==
=== Russian Empire (1780–1917) ===
Name	Appointment	Presentation	Termination	Prior position	Later position	Notes
Francis Dana	December 19, 1780		September 1783			Proceeded to post, but was not officially nominated at court.
William Short	August 1808		March 1809			The United States Senate rejected Short's nomination, and President Thomas Jefferson withdrew the nomination accordingly. He never reached Saint Petersburg.
John Quincy Adams	June 27, 1809	November 5, 1809	April 28, 1814	Senator	Minister to the United Kingdom, Secretary of State, President	Nomination of March 6, 1809 rejected by the Senate; nomination of June 26, 1809 confirmed.
William Pinkney	March 7, 1816	January 13, 1817	February 14, 1818	Senator, Attorney General	None	
George Washington Campbell	April 16, 1818	February 7, 1819	July 8, 1820	Senator, Secretary of the Treasury	None	
Henry Middleton	April 6, 1820	June 17, 1821	August 3, 1830	Congressman, Governor	None	
John Randolph	May 26, 1830		September 19, 1830	Senator	None	Proceeded to post, but did not present credentials.
James Buchanan	January 4, 1832	June 11, 1832	August 5, 1833	Congressman	Senator, Secretary of State, President	
William Wilkins	June 30, 1834	December 14, 1834	December 24, 1835	Senator	Congressman, Secretary of War	
John Randolph Clay	June 29, 1836	September 2, 1836	August 5, 1837			
George M. Dallas	March 7, 1837	August 6, 1837	July 29, 1839	Senator	Minister to the United Kingdom, Vice President	
Churchill C. Cambreleng	May 25, 1840	September 21, 1840	July 13, 1841	Congressman	None	Commissioned not of record; letter of credence issued on May 25, 1840.
Charles Stewart Todd	August 27, 1841	November 28, 1841	January 27, 1846	Army officer	None	
Ralph I. Ingersoll	August 8, 1846	May 30, 1847	July 1, 1848	Congressman	None	
Arthur P. Bagby	June 15, 1848	January 14, 1849	May 14, 1849	Senator	None	
Neill S. Brown	May 2, 1850	August 13, 1850	June 23, 1853	Governor	None	
Thomas H. Seymour	May 24, 1853	April 2, 1854	July 17, 1858	Governor	None	Commissioned during a recess of the Senate; recommissioned after confirmation on December 6, 1853.
Francis W. Pickens	January 11, 1858	July 18, 1858	September 9, 1860	Congressman	Governor	
John Appleton	June 8, 1860	September 9, 1860	June 8, 1861	None	Assistant Secretary of State	
Cassius Marcellus Clay	March 28, 1861	July 14, 1861	June 25, 1862	None	None	
Simon Cameron	January 17, 1862	June 25, 1862	September 18, 1862	Senator, Secretary of War	Senator	
Cassius Marcellus Clay	March 11, 1863	May 7, 1863	October 1, 1869			
Andrew G. Curtin	April 16, 1869	October 28, 1869	July 1, 1872	Governor	Congressman	
James Lawrence Orr	December 12, 1872	March 18, 1873	May 6, 1873	Governor	None	
Marshall Jewell	May 29, 1873	December 9, 1873	July 19, 1874	Governor	None	Commissioned during a recess of the Senate; recommissioned after confirmation on December 10, 1873.
George H. Boker	January 13, 1875	July 24, 1875	January 14, 1878	Minister to the Ottoman Empire	None	
Edwin W. Stoughton	October 30, 1877	January 14, 1878	March 2, 1879	Businessman	None	
John W. Foster	January 26, 1880	June 11, 1880	August 1, 1881	Minister to Mexico	Secretary of State	
William H. Hunt	April 12, 1882	August 23, 1882	February 27, 1884	Cabinet	None	Died at post.
Alphonso Taft	July 4, 1884	September 3, 1884	July 31, 1885	Minister to Austria	None	
George V. N. Lothrop	May 7, 1885	July 31, 1885	August 1, 1888	Publisher	Publisher	Commissioned during a recess of the Senate; recommissioned after confirmation on January 13, 1886.
Lambert Tree	September 25, 1888	January 4, 1889	February 2, 1889	Judge	Judge	
C. Allen Thorndike Rice	March 30, 1889					Took oath of office, but died in the United States before proceeding to post.
Charles Emory Smith	February 14, 1890	May 14, 1890	April 17, 1892	Publisher	Publisher	
Andrew D. White	July 22, 1892	November 7, 1892	October 1, 1894	College president	Ambassador to Germany	
Clifton R. Breckinridge	July 20, 1894	November 1, 1894	December 10, 1897	Congressman	None	Officially recognized on November 1, 1894.
Ethan A. Hitchcock	August 16, 1897	December 16, 1897		Business		Commissioned during a recess of the Senate; recommissioned after confirmation on December 18, 1897.
Ethan A. Hitchcock	February 11, 1898	March 21, 1898	January 28, 1899		Cabinet	Position upgraded to Ambassador Extraordinary and Plenipotentiary.
Charlemagne Tower, Jr.	January 12, 1899	March 19, 1899	November 19, 1902	Ambassador to Austro-Hungary	Ambassador to Germany	
Robert S. McCormick	September 26, 1902	January 12, 1903	March 27, 1905	Ambassador to Austro-Hungary	Ambassador to France	Commissioned during a recess of the Senate; recommissioned after confirmation on December 8, 1902.
George von Lengerke Meyer	March 8, 1905	April 12, 1905	January 26, 1907	Ambassador to Italy	Cabinet	
John W. Riddle	December 19, 1906	February 8, 1907	September 8, 1909	Secretary, Russia	Army	
William Woodville Rockhill	May 17, 1909	January 11, 1910	June 17, 1911	Minister to China	Ambassador to Turkey	
Curtis Guild	April 24, 1911	August 17, 1911	April 24, 1913	Governor	None	
George T. Marye	July 9, 1914	October 30, 1914	March 29, 1916			Resigned due to poor health.
David R. Francis	March 6, 1916	May 5, 1916	November 7, 1917			Normal relations interrupted, November 7, 1917, after the October Revolution; the new Soviet regime unrecognized by the United States when Francis left Russia on November 7, 1918. He was serving as Chargé d'Affaires ad interim when Embassy in Russia was closed September 14, 1919.

=== Soviet Union (1933–1991) ===
Name	Appointment	Presentation	Termination	Notes
William Christian Bullitt, Jr.	November 21, 1933	December 13, 1933	May 16, 1936	Commissioned during a recess of the Senate; recommissioned after confirmation on January 15, 1934.
Joseph E. Davies	November 16, 1936	January 25, 1937	June 11, 1938	Commissioned during a recess of the Senate; recommissioned after confirmation on January 23, 1937.
Laurence A. Steinhardt	March 23, 1939	August 11, 1939	November 12, 1941	
William H. Standley	February 14, 1942	April 14, 1942	September 19, 1943	
W. Averell Harriman	October 7, 1943	October 23, 1943	January 24, 1946	
Walter Bedell Smith	March 22, 1946	April 3, 1946	December 25, 1948	
Alan G. Kirk	May 21, 1949	July 4, 1949	October 6, 1951	
George F. Kennan	March 14, 1952	May 14, 1952	September 19, 1952	The Government of the Soviet Union declared Kennan persona non grata on October 3, 1952, and he did not return to his post.
Charles E. Bohlen	March 27, 1953	April 20, 1953	April 18, 1957	
Llewellyn Thompson	June 3, 1957	July 16, 1957	July 27, 1962	
Foy D. Kohler	August 20, 1962	September 27, 1962	November 14, 1966	
Llewellyn Thompson	October 13, 1966	January 23, 1967	January 14, 1969	
Jacob D. Beam	March 14, 1969	April 18, 1969	January 24, 1973	Adolph Dubs served as Chargé d'Affaires ad interim between January 1973 and March 1974.
Walter J. Stoessel, Jr.	December 19, 1973	March 4, 1974	September 13, 1976	
Malcolm Toon	November 24, 1976	January 18, 1977	October 16, 1979	Commissioned during a recess of the Senate; recommissioned after confirmation on June 8, 1977.
Thomas J. Watson, Jr.	October 10, 1979	October 29, 1979	January 15, 1981	
Arthur A. Hartman	September 28, 1981	October 26, 1981	February 20, 1987	
Jack F. Matlock, Jr.	March 12, 1987	April 6, 1987	August 11, 1991	
Robert S. Strauss	August 2, 1991	August 24, 1991	November 19, 1992	Commissioned to the Soviet Union – continued to serve as Ambassador to the Russian Federation after the collapse of the USSR.

=== Russian Federation (1992–present) ===
Image	Name	Appointment	Presentation	Termination	Notes
	Thomas R. Pickering	May 12, 1993	May 21, 1993	November 1, 1996	Chargé d'Affaires ad interim: Richard M. Miles (November 1996–May 1997), and John F. Tefft (May 1997–January 1998).
	James Franklin Collins	August 1, 1996	January 26, 1998	July 10, 2001	
	Alexander Vershbow	July 12, 2001	October 17, 2001	July 22, 2005	
	William J. Burns	August 10, 2005	November 8, 2005	May 12, 2008	
	John Beyrle	May 13, 2008	September 18, 2008	January 4, 2012	
	Michael McFaul	January 10, 2012	February 22, 2012	February 26, 2014	
	John F. Tefft	July 31, 2014	November 19, 2014	September 28, 2017	Anthony Godfrey, Chargé d'Affaires ad interim
	Jon Huntsman Jr.	September 28, 2017	October 3, 2017	October 3, 2019	
	John J. Sullivan	December 12, 2019	February 5, 2020	September 4, 2022	Elizabeth Rood, Chargé d'Affaires ad interim
	Lynne Tracy	December 21, 2022	January 30, 2023	June 27, 2025	J. Douglas Dykhouse, Chargé d'Affaires ad interim

== See also ==
- Embassy of the United States, Moscow
- List of ambassadors of Russia to the United States
- Russia–United States relations
- Soviet Union–United States relations
- Russian Empire–United States relations
- Ambassadors of the United States
