= Spaso House =

House in Moscow, Russia

Coordinates: 55°45′02″N 37°35′17″E

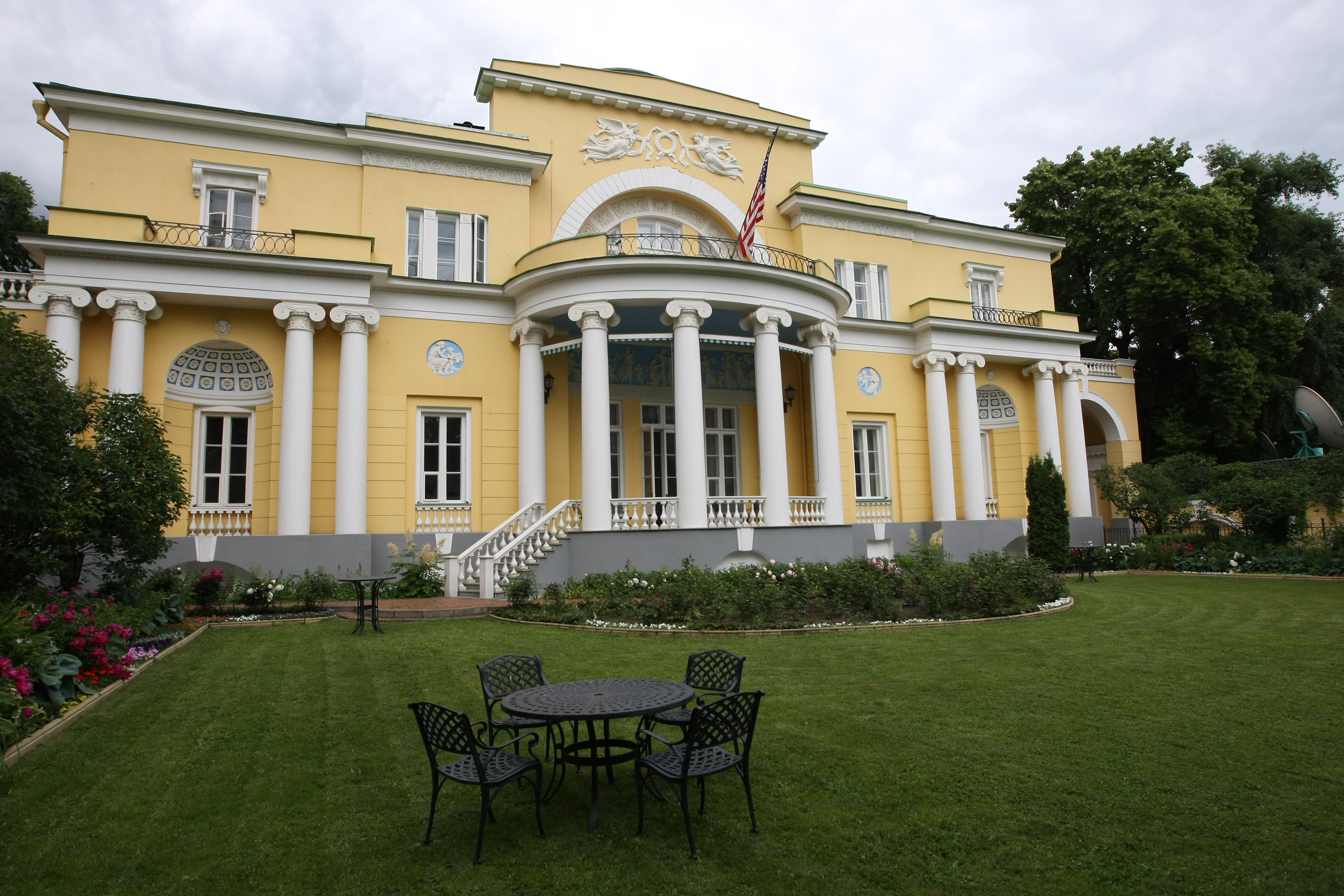
Spaso House, Residence of the U.S. Ambassador in Moscow

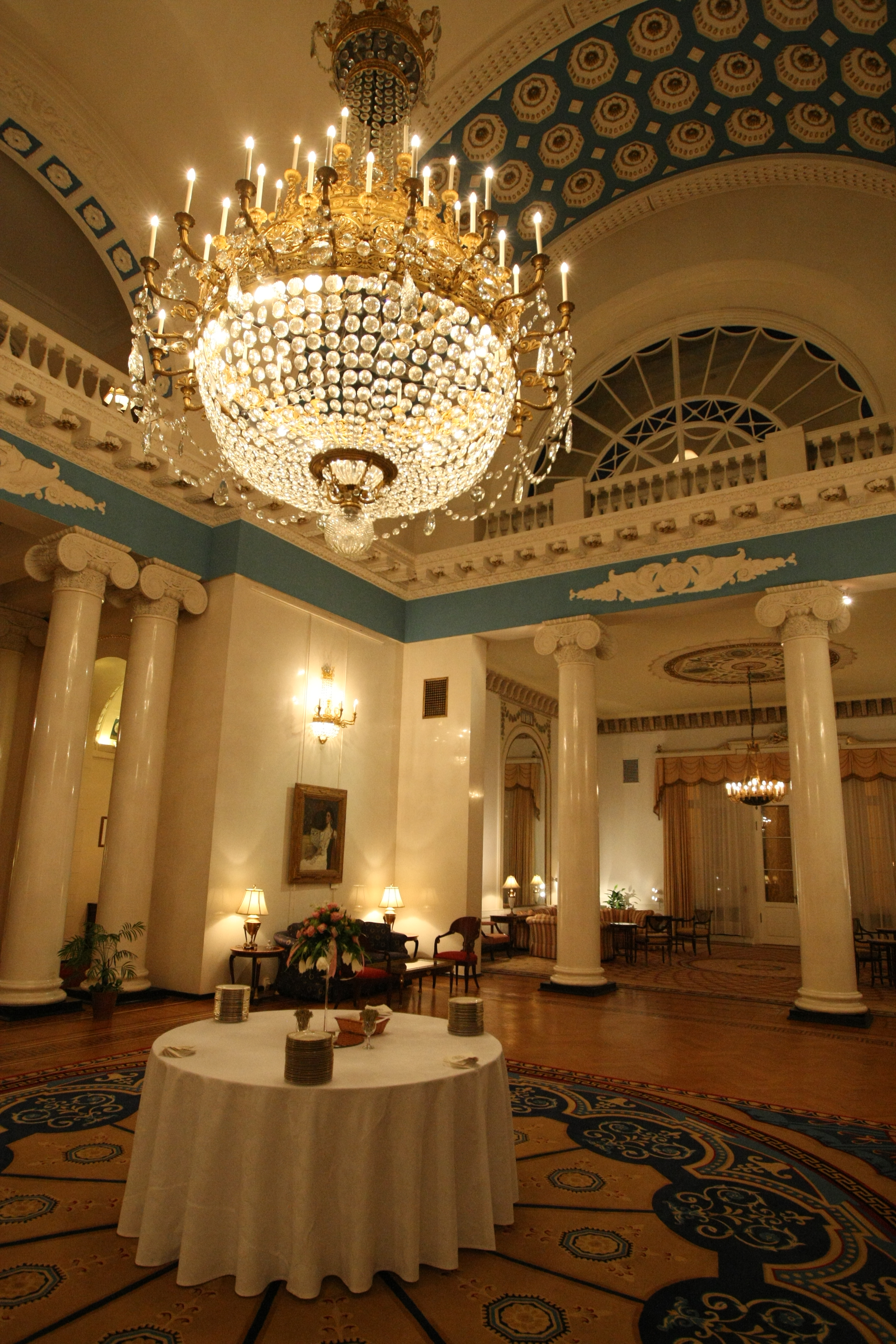
The Chandelier Room of Spaso House

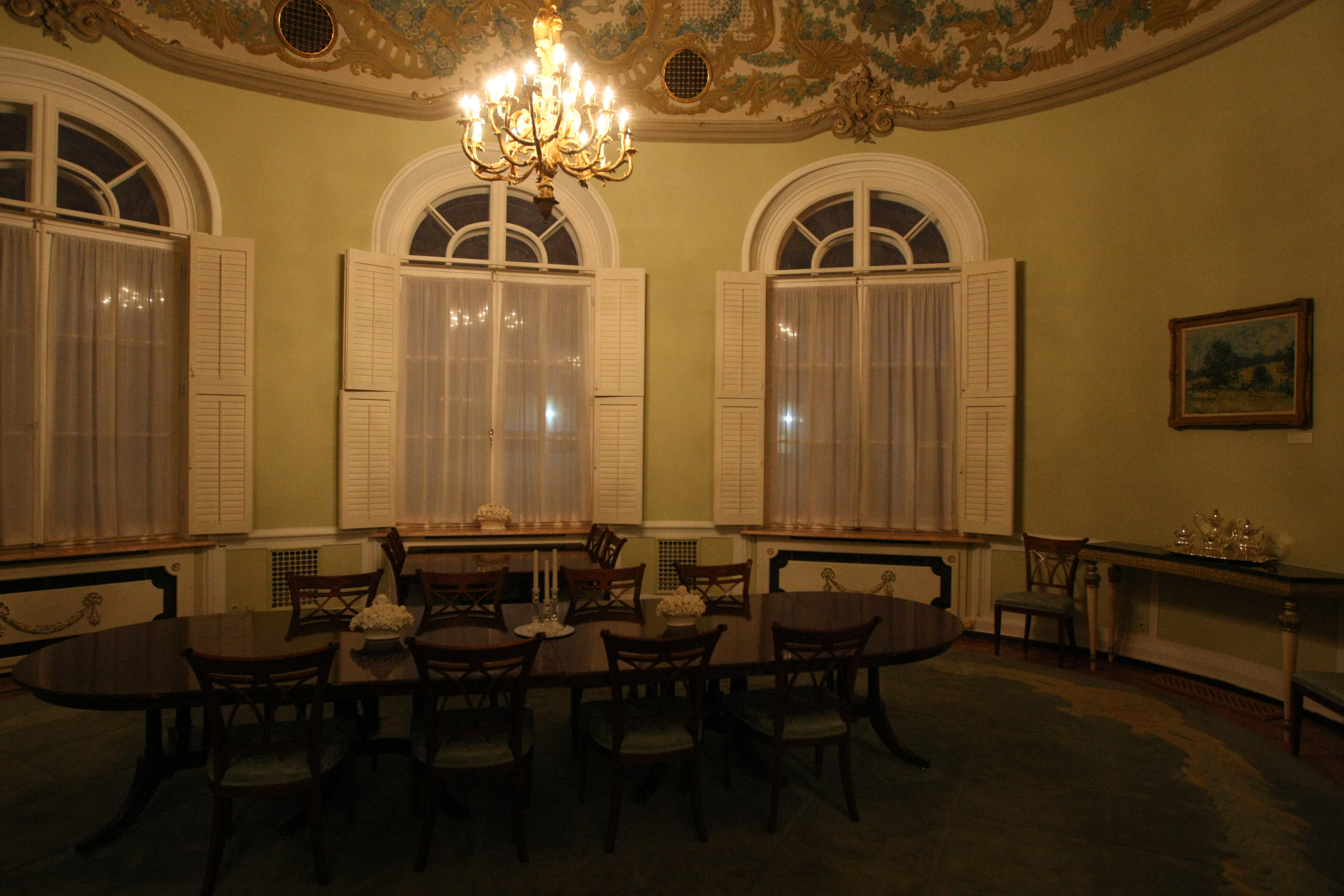
The Oval Dining Room of Spaso House

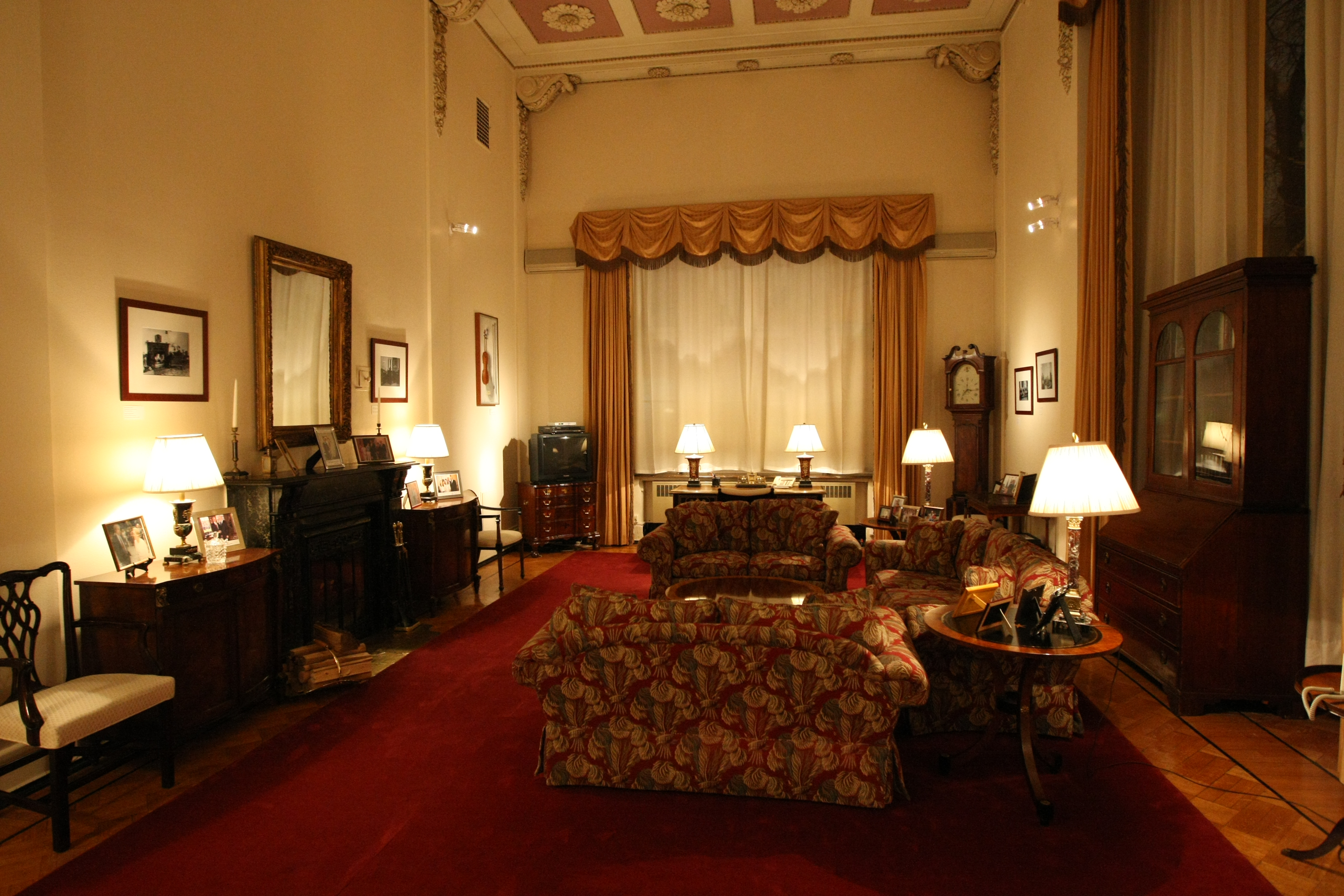
The library of Spaso House

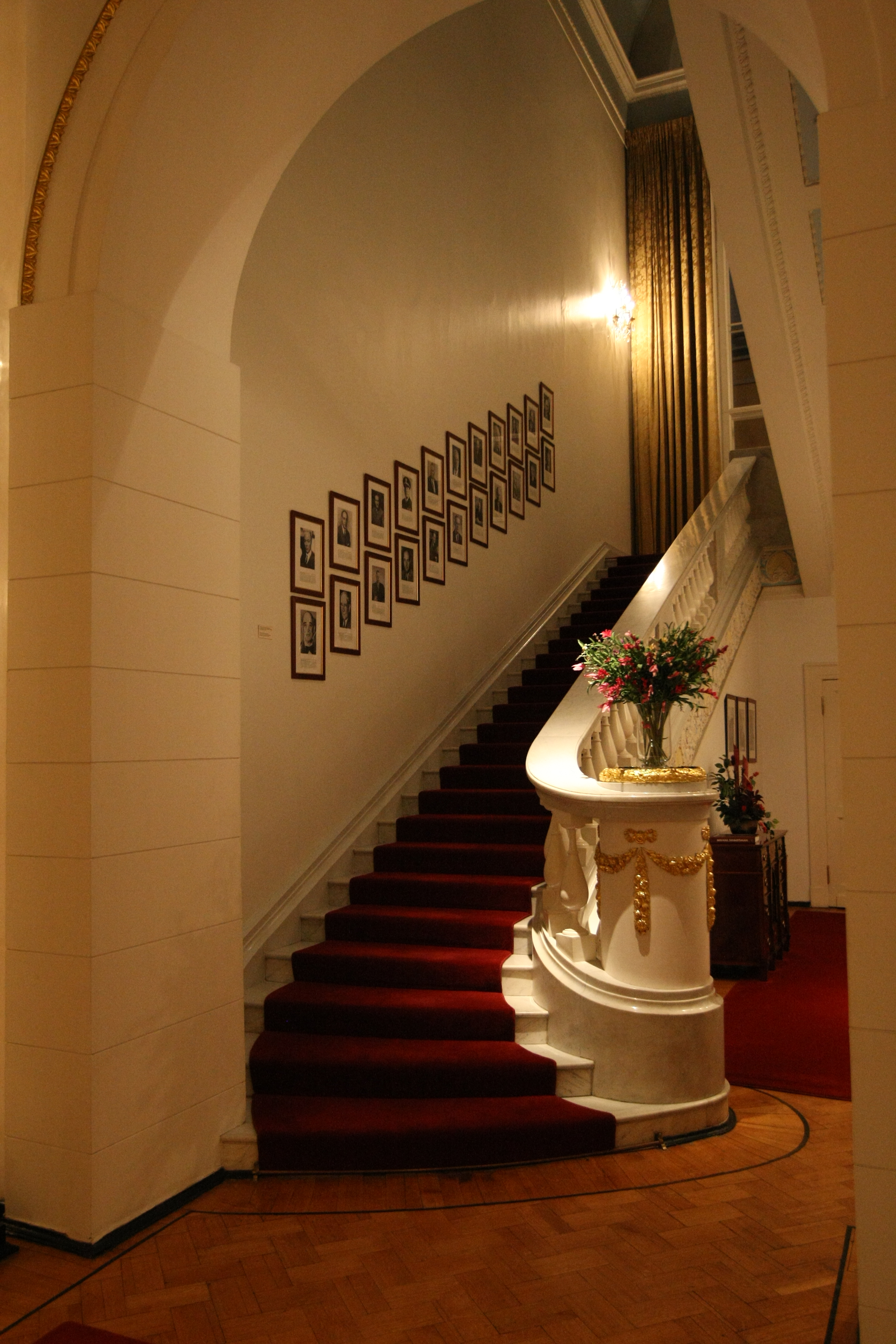
The stairway of Spaso House inspired a memorable scene in the 1935 Mikhail Bulgakov novel Master and Margarita

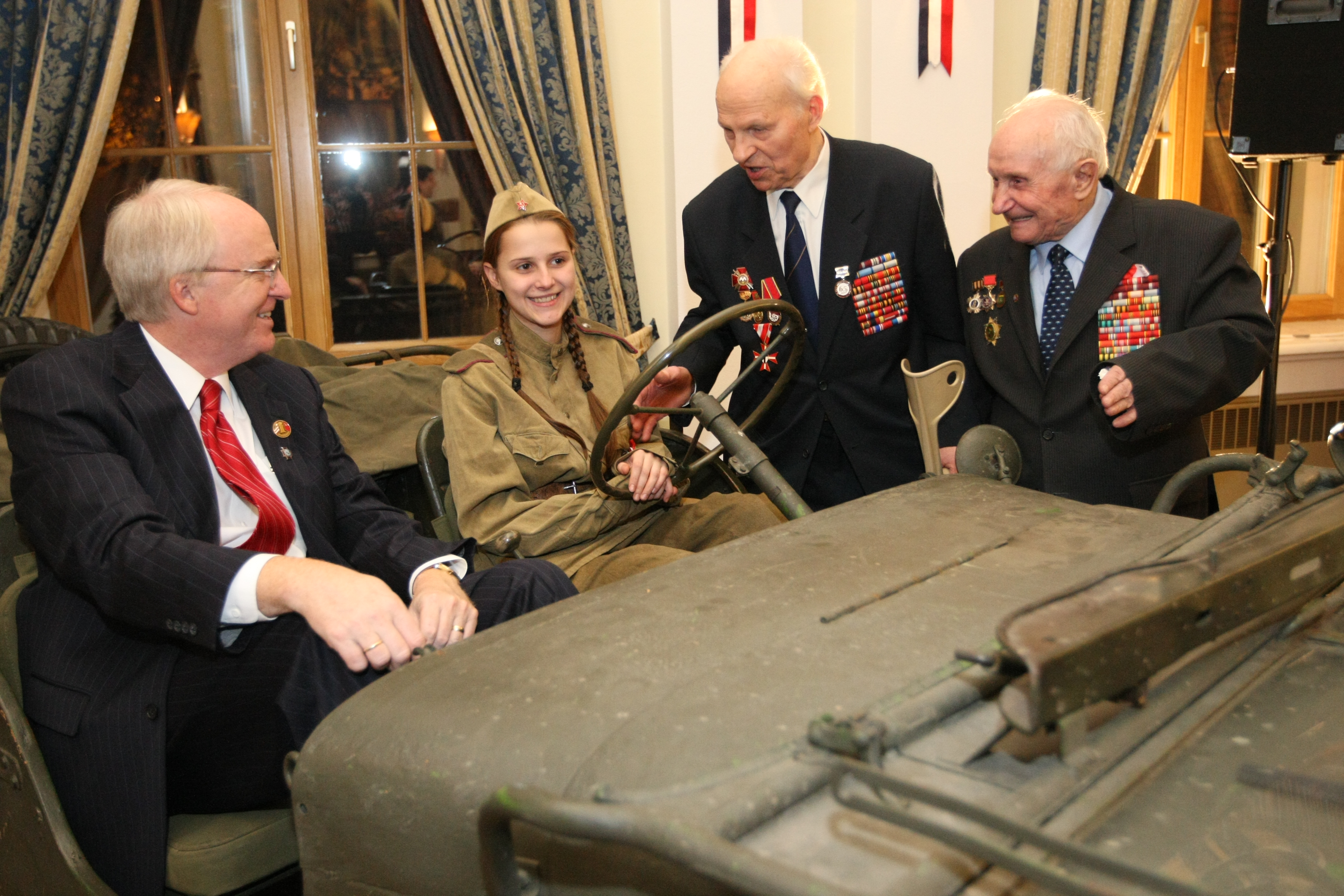
For Veterans Day 2009, Ambassador John Beyrle (left) honored Russian World War II veterans with a reception at Spaso House, which featured a real 1943 Lend-Lease jeep parked in the Ballroom

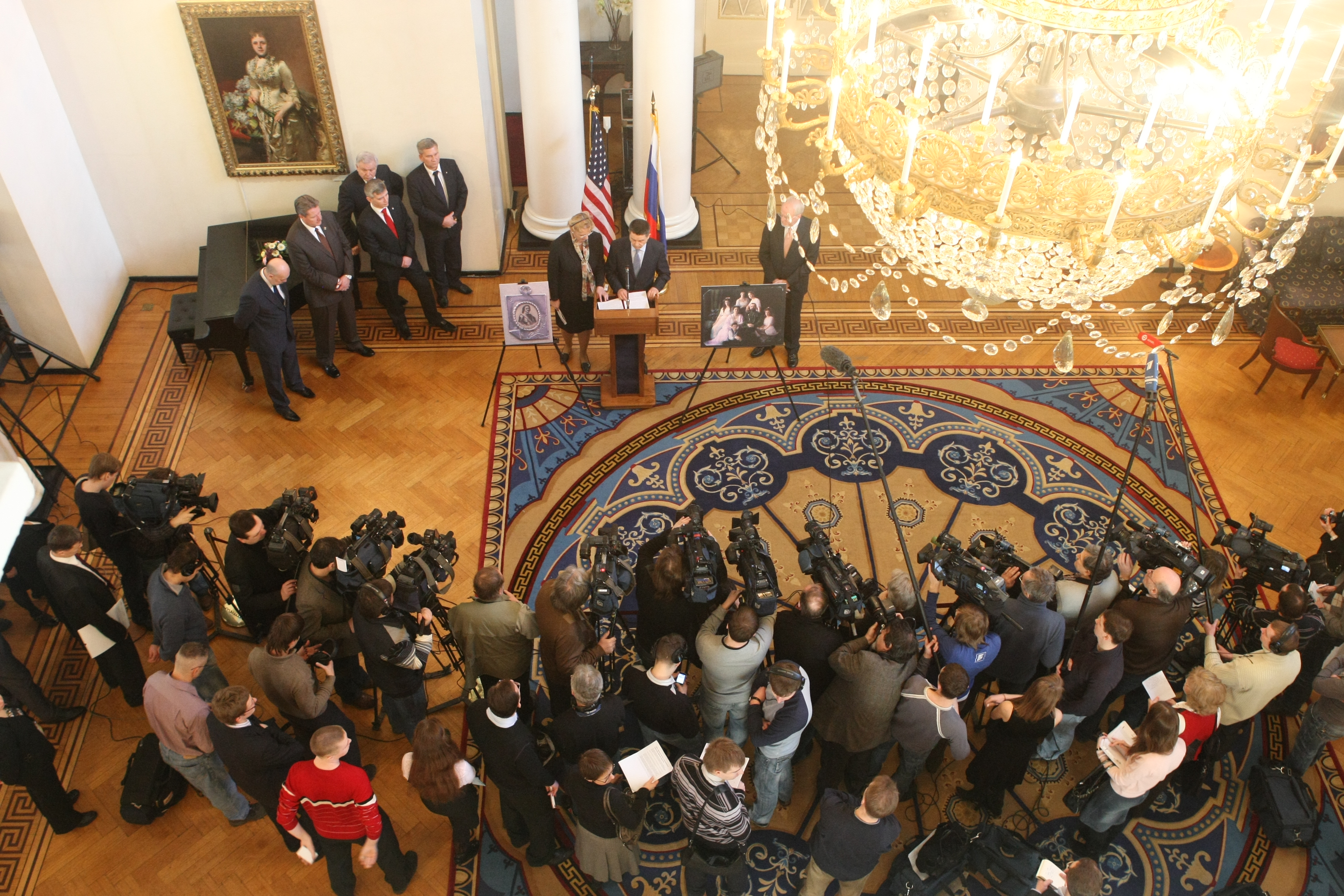
TV cameras crowd the Chandelier Room of Spaso House as Ambassador Beyrle announces the return of a medallion belonging to the Czar's family stolen from the Hermitage and recovered by a joint operation of Russian and American law enforcement

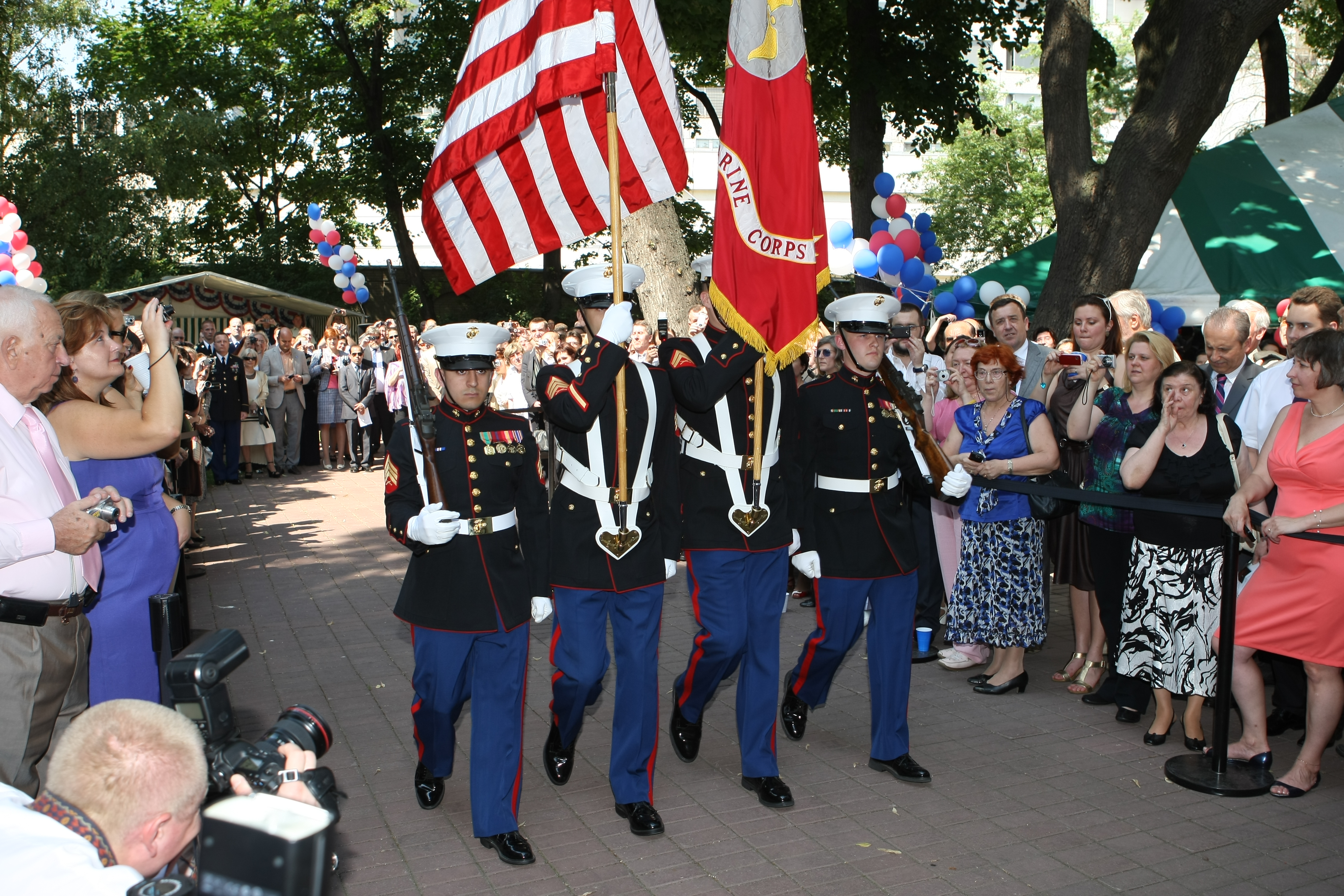
American Independence Day celebration in the garden of Spaso House (2010)

Spaso House is a listed Neoclassical Revival building at No. 10 Spasopeskovskaya Square in Moscow. It was originally built in 1913 as the mansion of the textile industrialist Nikolay Vtorov. Since 1933, it has been the residence of the U.S. ambassador to the Soviet Union, and since 1991, to the Russian Federation. The building belonged to the USSR and later Russia and, under the 1985 lease contract, the U.S. was supposed to pay 72,500 Soviet roubles per year, which by 2001 was the equivalent of about $3, which the U.S. had failed to pay in 1993. In 2004, the two sides concluded a new 49-year lease that was said to be based on a joint assessment of the property's value; the rent rate was not disclosed.

== History ==
=== Early history ===
Spaso House takes its name from Spasopeskovskaya Square, in the Arbat District. "Spasopeskovskaya" meant "Saviour on the Sands", referring to the sandy soil of the neighborhood, which was first settled in the seventeenth century. Most of the original wooden houses on the square were burned by the fire of Moscow (1812). New stone houses were built soon afterwards, including two one-story mansions of plaster-covered stone with columned porticos, built by A. G. Shchepochkina, which stand today at number 6 and number 8 Spasopeskovskaya square, on either side of Spaso House.

In 1913 a large lot on the square was sold by Princess Lobanova-Rostovaya to the family of the Russian industrialist Nikolay Vtorov, who owned the largest textile manufacturing firm in Imperial Russia. Vtorov commissioned the architects Vladimir Adamovich and Vladimir Mayat, two prominent advocates of the neoclassical style, to build the new mansion. As a student, Adamovich had worked with F.O. Shekhel, the master of Russian Art Nouveau in the early 1900s. They chose the "New Empire" style, which was popular with the Russian business class. The exterior of the house was influenced by the Gagarin House, a fine example of the Muscovite Empire Style, which had been built in the 1820s by Joseph Bové.

Another likely source was the Polovtsev House in Saint Petersburg by Ivan Fomin, completed in 1913.

Externally and internally, Vtorov House was a recreation of an early 1820s upper-class estate, with palladian windows and a perfectly symmetrical floorplan. Work on the house began in April 1913, and by the summer the exterior was nearly completed. Work on the interior continued during the winter of 1913-1914. The house was completed and the Vtorovs moved in shortly before the beginning of World War I in August 1914.

In the turbulent months following the Bolshevik Revolution in 1917, Nikolay Vtorov died mysteriously and his family fled Russia. Spaso House was expropriated by the new Soviet government. Spaso House served as a reception house for the All-Russia Central Executive Committee, then as a residence for Soviet diplomats, including Georgi Chicherin, the People's Commissar for Foreign Affairs from 1918 to 1930, and Lev Karakhan, who was Chicherin's deputy.

=== Residence of U.S. ambassadors ===
After 16 years of not recognizing the Soviet Union, the United States finally established diplomatic relations with Moscow in 1933. The first American ambassador to the Soviet Union, William C. Bullitt (1891–1967), came to Moscow and selected a building on Mokhovaya street as the new U.S. Chancery and the Vtorov House as his temporary residence. The Vtorov House appealed to Bullitt because it had large space for entertaining and an American-style heating system, installed by the Soviet Government in 1928. The new third secretary of the embassy, George Kennan (1904–2005), negotiated a three-year lease for the property for $75,000. Bullitt did not ask for a longer lease, because he had a plan to build a new residence, similar to Thomas Jefferson's Monticello, in the Sparrow Hills, but the Soviet government never granted the land for the new house, so Spaso House became the permanent ambassador's residence.

Early in 1934, the ambassador and the first American diplomatic staff moved into Spaso House, which, due to structural problems with the Mohovaya street building, at first served as both the residence and embassy chancery. The U.S. government constructed a new ballroom for Spaso House in 1935 to provide more space for entertaining large groups. On July 4, 1934, Bullitt hosted the first Fourth of July reception at Spaso House, and also led a team of U.S. diplomats in a game of baseball against a team of Moscow-based American journalists.

Bullitt's parties at Spaso House became legendary. The Spaso House Christmas party of 1934, held in the Chandelier Room, featured three performing seals from the Moscow Zoo, who came into the room balancing a Christmas tree, a tray of glasses, and a bottle of champagne. When the performance ended, the seal's trainer, who had been drinking, passed out, and the seals galloped free throughout the house.

=== The Spring Festival of 1935 ===
Of all the social events held in Spaso House, the most famous was the Spring Festival hosted by Ambassador Bullitt on April 24, 1935. Bullitt instructed his staff to create an event that would surpass every other embassy party in Moscow's history. The decorations included a forest of ten young birch trees in the chandelier room, a dining room table covered with Finnish tulips, a lawn made of chicory grown on wet felt; an aviary made from fishnet filled with pheasants, parakeets, and one hundred zebra finches, on loan from the Moscow Zoo; and a menagerie of several mountain goats, a dozen white roosters, and a baby bear.

Although Stalin did not attend, the four hundred guests at the festival included Foreign Minister Maxim Litvinov, Defense Minister Klim Voroshilov, Communist Party luminaries Nikolai Bukharin, Lazar Kaganovich, and Karl Radek, and Soviet Marshals Aleksandr Yegorov, Mikhail Tukhachevsky, and Semyon Budyonny, and the writer Mikhail Bulgakov.

The festival lasted until the early hours of the morning. The bear became drunk on champagne given to him by Karl Radek, and in the early morning hours the zebra finches escaped from the aviary and perched below the ceilings around the house, but other than that the party was considered a great success.

Mikhail Bulgakov transformed the Spring Festival into The Spring Ball of the Full Moon, which became one of the most memorable episodes of his novel The Master and Margarita.

=== Late 1930s and World War II ===
After July 1935, when the Soviet Government invited the American Communist Party to take part in the anti-western Communist International (Comintern), Soviet-American relations turned increasingly chilly, and Bullitt held no more memorable parties.

In 1936 Bullitt was replaced by a new ambassador, Joseph E. Davies, who was married to Marjorie Merriweather Post, heiress to the Post Cereal Company/General Foods Corporation fortune. Davies and his wife made major repairs to Spaso at their own expense, rewiring the house and installing American bathtubs. They also used their private yacht to bring 2000 pints of frozen cream to Moscow, much of which spoiled when the power in the house went out.

Davies and his family were also subjected to intense surveillance from the Soviet Government. They learned that their domestic staff was spying on them, and discovered microphones hidden throughout the house.

Davies left Moscow in June 1938, but relations with Moscow remained tense; his successor, Laurence Steinhardt, did little entertaining at Spaso House.

The German invasion of the Soviet Union in June 1941 led to dramatic changes in the life of Spaso House. Spaso House was slightly damaged by German bombing in the autumn of 1941. In October 1941, most of the American diplomatic staff were evacuated to the city of Kuibyshev, 540 miles southeast of Moscow. A six-man team of American diplomats, led by Second Secretary Llewellyn Thompson, kept the embassy functioning, issuing transit visas and reporting to Washington on the military situation. The new U.S. ambassador, Admiral William Standley, based in Kuibyshev, traveled regularly to Spaso House to meet with Soviet officials to discuss American military assistance.

In August 1943, as the Germans began to fall back from Moscow, Ambassador W. Averell Harriman replaced Standley, and the full American diplomatic staff returned to Moscow, supplemented by many military staff helping to bring American military aid to the USSR. Spaso House became an office building, a dormitory for staff, and a hotel for important visitors. Spaso House guests included Presidential advisor Harry Hopkins, former Presidential candidate Wendell Willkie, Secretaries of State Cordell Hull and Edward Stettinius. In August 1945, General Dwight Eisenhower came to Spaso House to celebrate the Allied victory in Europe.

In August 1945, a delegation from the Young Pioneer organization of the Soviet Union presented a carved wooden plaque of the Great Seal of the United States to U.S. ambassador Averell Harriman, as a "gesture of friendship" to the USSR's World War II ally. Unknown to anyone in the embassy, it contained The Thing, a covert listening device (or "bug"), enabling the Soviet Union to spy on the United States. It hung in the ambassador's residential study undetected until it was exposed in 1952.

From March to April 1947, Spaso House was the site of a meeting of the Council of Foreign Ministers, including Secretary of State George Marshall, who met in Moscow to draft the final peace treaties with Germany and Austria.

=== The Cold War ===
Increased tensions between the Soviet Union and the United States, the division of Europe into eastern and western blocs, and the Korean War led to increased isolation for the residents of Spaso House. Ambassador George Kennan was always followed by plainclothes police when he left the house, and additional listening devices were found inside Spaso House in 1952, including the microphone hidden inside a wooden seal of the United States.

After the death of Joseph Stalin in March 1953, the frozen American-Soviet relationship began little by little to thaw. Communist Party General Secretary Nikita Khrushchev made surprise appearances at the 4th of July receptions at Spaso House in 1954 and 1955. Vice President Richard Nixon stayed at Spaso House when he came to Moscow to open the first large-scale American National Exposition in Sokolniki Park, and dined with Khrushchev at a dinner at Spaso House hosted by Ambassador Llewellyn Thompson. The Cold War was still not over - shortly before Nixon's visit, a microphone was discovered hidden in the chandelier near Ambassador Thompson's office. Nonetheless, five thousand Soviet citizens attended events at Spaso House in 1957, more than in the previous twenty-three years.

The building of the Berlin Wall and Cuban Missile Crisis caused a new chill in Russian-American relations, but after the assassination of President John F. Kennedy on November 22, 1963, both General Secretary Khrushchev and Foreign Minister Andrei Gromyko came to Spaso House to express their condolences to the new U.S. ambassador, Foy D. Kohler.

=== Detente and the end of the Cold War ===
In the late 1960s and early 1970s, Soviet-American relations began to improve again. On May 26, 1972, President Richard Nixon, Soviet General Secretary Leonid Brezhnev and Premier Alexei Kosygin used Spaso House as the venue to announce their agreement on the first round of Strategic Arms Limitation Talks (SALT 1) and on an Anti-Ballistic Missile Treaty. The treaties were signed shortly afterwards at the Kremlin.

The visit of President Nixon was the first visit of a U.S. president to Moscow, and the second visit of a U.S. president to the USSR since Franklin Roosevelt went to Yalta in February 1945. While Nixon did not stay at Spaso House, staying at the Kremlin instead, he did host a dinner for Soviet leaders in the ballroom of Spaso House on May 26, 1972, after the announcement of the START and ABM agreements. That evening the pianist Van Cliburn also played a concert at Spaso House, the first of a long series of performances at Spaso by major American artists.

The early 1980s saw a series of turnovers in the Soviet leadership. Vice President George H. W. Bush came to Spaso house three times to attend the funerals of General Secretaries Leonid Brezhnev, Yuri Andropov and Konstantin Chernenko.

In April 1986, another American cultural envoy, pianist Vladimir Horowitz, stayed at Spaso House, along with his own Steinway piano, shipped by diplomatic pouch from New York, preparing for his historic April 20 concert at the Great Hall of the Moscow Conservatory, marking his return to his homeland after an absence of 60 years. Other notable American musicians who performed at Spaso were Leonard Bernstein, Mstislav Rostropovich, Ray Charles, and Chick Corea. In 1984, John Denver and Kermit the Frog (Jim Henson) entertained the American and Russian children of the Spaso House staff. On May 31, 1988, the jazz pianist Dave Brubeck performed in the Spaso House ballroom for President Ronald Reagan and the new Soviet leader, Mikhail Gorbachev.

The 1991 Fourth of July Reception at Spaso House was not attended by President Gorbachev, but it was attended by Boris Yeltsin, the president of the Russian Federation. A month later, an attempted coup against Gorbachev failed, the Soviet Union collapsed, and Yeltsin became the leader of the new Russia. The 1992 Fourth of July Reception was not attended by Boris Yeltsin, but it was attended by Mikhail Gorbachev, who no longer had a job. The occupant of Spaso House, Ambassador Robert Strauss, had a new title; he was the last ambassador to the Soviet Union and the first ambassador to the Russian Federation.

=== Post-Soviet Era ===
In the years following the breakup of the Soviet Union, President Bill Clinton visited Moscow four times, and each time was a guest of Spaso House. On March 24, 2002, President George W. Bush also came to Spaso House to commemorate the signing that day of the Moscow Treaty on Strategic Offensive Arms Reductions.

During the tenure of Ambassador John Beyrle, Spaso House was the site of several symbolic events which symbolized the "reset" and improvement of Russian-American relations. These included a reception for Russian World War II veterans, which featured a real World War II Lend-Lease jeep parked in the ballroom; a ceremony for the return of a medallion, owned by the family of Czar Nicholas II, which had been stolen from the Hermitage Museum, and recovered by American and Russian law enforcement; and a ceremony on July 20, 2010 honoring the Apollo-Soyuz Test Project, the first joint Soviet-American space mission in July 1975, with the participation of astronauts Thomas Patten Stafford and Vance Brand and cosmonauts Alexei Leonov and Valeri Kubasov.

External videos
- Enchanted Ball at Spaso House, October 29, 2010

On October 29, 2010, Ambassador Beyrle celebrated the connections between American and Russian literature and culture by hosting an Enchanted Ball at Spaso House. The ball recalled the Spring Ball of 1935 held by Ambassador William Bullitt, which inspired the ball in the novel Master and Margarita by Mikhail Bulgakov. Guests at the 2010 ball included theater director Oleg Tabakov, writers Victor Erofeev and Vladimir Sorokin, and sculptors Zurab Tsereteli and Alexander Bourganov.

== U.S. Ambassadors who lived in Spaso House ==
Ambassador	Date of arrival	Ambassador	Date of arrival
William Christian Bullitt Jr.	November 1933	Thomas J. Watson Jr.	October 1979
Joseph E. Davies	November 1936	Arthur A. Hartman	October 1981
Laurence A. Steinhardt	March 1939	Jack F. Matlock Jr.	April 1987
William H. Standley	February 1942	Robert S. Strauss	August 1991
W. Averell Harriman	October 1943	Thomas R. Pickering	May 1993
Walter Bedell Smith	March 1946	James Franklin Collins	September 1997
Alan G. Kirk	May 1949	Alexander Vershbow	July 2001
George F. Kennan	March 1952	William J. Burns	July 2005
Charles E. Bohlen	March 1953	John Beyrle	July 2008
Llewellyn E. Thompson	June 1957	Michael McFaul	January 2012
Foy D. Kohler	August 1962	John F. Tefft	September 2014
Llewellyn E. Thompson	December 1967	Jon Huntsman Jr.	October 2017
Jacob D. Beam	April 1969	John J. Sullivan	December 2019
Walter J. Stoessel Jr.	February 1974	Lynne M. Tracy	January 2023
Malcolm Toon	January 1977		

== Sources ==
- Tatyana Dudina, "The Morgan of Moscow," reprinted in Spaso House- A Short History, published by the U.S. Embassy Moscow, 2001.
- Spaso House; 75 Years: A Short History, published by the U.S. Embassy Moscow, 2008.
- Moskva Encyclopedia, Nauchnoye Izdatedestvo Bolshaya Rossiskaya Encyclopedia, Moscow, 1997.
- Charles W. Thayer. Bears in the Caviar, Lippincott, New York and Philadelphia, 1950.
- Rebecca Matlock, Spaso House: People and meetings: Notes of the wife of an American ambassador (in Russian) Translated from English by T. Kudriavtseva, Moscow: EKSMO, Algorithm, 2004 ISBN 5-699-05497-9
