= Dykhouse =

Dykhouse is a surname. Notable people with the surname include:

- J. Douglas Dykhouse (fl. from 2025), American diplomat
- Jans Dykhouse (1889–1981), American politician

== See also ==
- Dana J. Dykhouse Stadium
