= Llewellyn Thompson =

American diplomat

Llewellyn E. Thompson
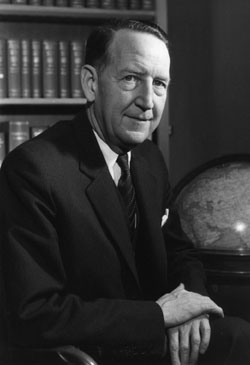

United States Ambassador to the Soviet Union
- In office January 23, 1967 – January 14, 1969
- President: Lyndon B. Johnson
- Preceded by: Foy D. Kohler
- Succeeded by: Jacob D. Beam
- In office July 16, 1957 – July 27, 1962
- President: Dwight David Eisenhower; John F. Kennedy
- Preceded by: Charles E. Bohlen
- Succeeded by: Foy D. Kohler

United States Ambassador to Austria
- In office September 4, 1952 – July 9, 1957
- President: Dwight D. Eisenhower
- Preceded by: Walter J. Donnelly
- Succeeded by: H. Freeman Matthews

United States Ambassador At Large for Soviet Affairs
- In office October 3, 1962 – December 26, 1966
- President: John F. Kennedy

Personal details
- Born: August 24, 1904 Las Animas, Colorado, U.S.
- Died: February 6, 1972 (aged 67) Bethesda, Maryland, U.S.
- Spouse: Jane Monroe Goelet
- Education: University of Colorado at Boulder
- Profession: Artist
- Awards: President's Award for Distinguished Federal Civilian Service (1962)

Llewellyn E. "Tommy" Thompson Jr. (August 24, 1904 – February 6, 1972) was an American diplomat. He served in Sri Lanka, Austria, and for a lengthy period in the Soviet Union, where his tenure saw some of the most significant events of the Cold War. He was a key advisor to President John F. Kennedy during the Cuban Missile Crisis. A 2019 assessment described him as "arguably the most influential figure who ever advised U.S. presidents about policy toward the Soviet Union during the Cold War."

== Early life ==
Thompson was born in Las Animas, Colorado, the son of a rancher. He was possibly of Welsh descent. He studied economics at the University of Colorado at Boulder.

== Diplomatic career ==
In 1928, he joined the foreign service. He was the first US representative to the International Labour Organization of the League of Nations. He was the second secretary at the US embassy to the Soviet Union from 1941 and remained in Moscow with a skeleton staff after Germany invaded the Soviet Union, which forced the US embassy to withdraw to Kuybyshev in October 1941. He was present at the first conference of the United Nations and participated in the discussions that resulted in the Truman Doctrine.

Thompson was the High Commissioner or U.S. Ambassador to Austria from 1952 to 1957. There, he negotiated the settlement of the Free Territory of Trieste between Yugoslavia and Italy. In 1955, he represented the United States in the final negotiations for an Austrian State Treaty, which returned Austria's sovereignty after the country's occupation.

He served as ambassador to the Soviet Union from 1957 to 1962 and again from 1967 until 1969. In his first term there, he developed a unique relationship with Nikita Khrushchev, which helped to contain the Berlin Crisis. He was the first American to give an address on Soviet television.

Gary Powers's ill-fated U-2 high-altitude spy flight took place during his tenure, as did the American exhibition and the famous "kitchen debate" with Richard Nixon. He participated in both the Camp David summit between Dwight Eisenhower and Khrushchev and the Vienna summit between Kennedy and Khrushchev.

During the Cuban Missile Crisis, Thompson served on Kennedy's ExComm (Executive Committee of the National Security Council) when the US received two messages from Khrushchev, one quite conciliatory and the other much more hawkish. Thompson advised Kennedy to react to the first message and said that the second had probably been written with Politburo input. Thompson's belief was that Khrushchev would be willing to withdraw the Soviet missiles from Cuba if he could portray the avoidance of a US invasion of the island as a strategic success. Thompson also testified before the Warren Commission, which investigated the Kennedy assassination.

On August 7, 1962, he was awarded the President's Award for Distinguished Federal Civilian Service by President John F. Kennedy.

He held a number of other positions throughout his foreign service career, including Ambassador-at-Large for Soviet Affairs and Deputy Under-Secretary of State for Political Affairs. In his second term in Moscow under President Lyndon Johnson, Thompson was present at the Glassboro Summit Conference between Johnson and Alexei Kosygin to discuss US-Soviet relations with the Soviets. Thompson was a pivotal participant in the formulation of Lyndon Johnson administration's non-proliferation policy on nuclear weapons and was instrumental in beginning the Strategic Arms Limitation Talks process. After Thompson's retirement, he was recruited by President Richard Nixon to participate in the SALT I negotiations.

== Family ==
Thompson's wife, Jane Monroe Goelet, an artist, brought art from the US State Department's Art in Embassies Program to the ambassador's residence at Spaso House, Moscow. The program exhibits original works by US citizens in the public areas of ambassador’s residences all over the world.

His daughters have written a biography published in March 2018 by Johns Hopkins University Press: "The Kremlinologist: Llewellyn E Thompson, America's Man in Cold War Moscow" (ISBN 978-1421424095).

== Death and legacy ==
Thompson died of cancer in 1972 and is buried in his hometown of Las Animas.

U.S. Route 50 through Las Animas was renamed to Ambassador Thompson Boulevard.

Diplomatic posts
Preceded by Walter J. Donnelly	United States Ambassador to Austria; 1952 – 1957	Succeeded by H. Freeman Matthews
Preceded by Charles E. Bohlen	United States Ambassador to the Soviet Union; 1957 – 1962	Succeeded by Foy D. Kohler
Preceded by Foy D. Kohler	United States Ambassador to the Soviet Union; 1967 – 1969	Succeeded by Jacob D. Beam
