= Richard B. Russell Library for Political Research and Studies =

Coordinates: 33°57′18″N 83°22′39″W

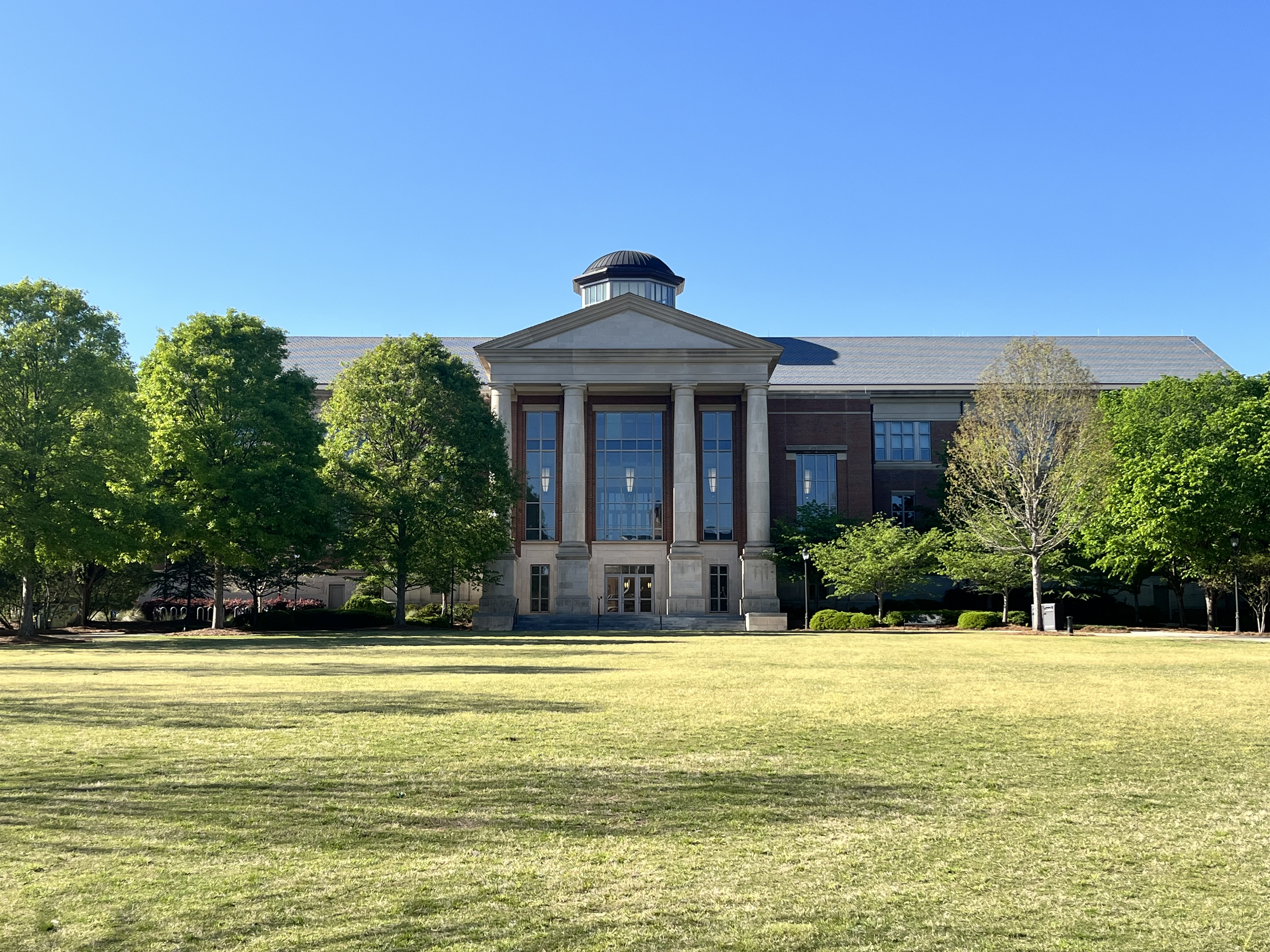
- The Richard B. Russell Library, where the Library for Political Research and Studies is located, in 2025
- Established: 1974
- Location: 300 S. Hull St. Athens, GA 30605
- Director: Ashton G. Ellett
- Website: www.libs.uga.edu/russell

The Richard B. Russell Library for Political Research and Studies is an archive of political and historical primary documents relating to the modern American political system. The Russell Library is one of three Special Collections Libraries located in the Richard B. Russell Building on the campus of the University of Georgia in Athens. The address is 300 S. Hull Street. The Russell Library is a department within the University of Georgia Libraries that reports to the University Librarian.

The Russell Library is a charter member of the Association of Centers for the Study of Congress.

== History ==
=== Founding ===
During the 1960s, representatives of the University of Georgia Libraries corresponded with Senator Richard B. Russell Jr. on several occasions about donating his papers. In 1969, a group of Russell's friends persuaded him that a foundation should be established to document his life and career. In June 1970, the Richard B. Russell Foundation was incorporated under the laws of the state of Georgia.

After the senator's death in 1971, the Russell Foundation and its first chair, U.S. senator Herman E. Talmadge, raised a significant endowment to establish the library and to fund a Russell Chair in American History at the university. Working with the University System Board of Regents and University of Georgia officials, the foundation trustees agreed to locate the Russell Library on the ground floor of the university's main library, with its own entrance. In 1974, the executors of the Russell estate turned over the Russell collection to the foundation, which then transferred it to the university. The Russell Library was dedicated in June 1974.

The library's original mission was to collect and preserve materials that document the life and career of Richard B. Russell, a United States senator from Georgia from 1933 to 1971. Since then, it has expanded to serve as a repository for the papers of individuals and organizations predominantly related to Georgia politics.

=== Richard B. Russell Building, Special Collections Libraries ===
The first special collections department at the University of Georgia was established in 1953. In the years since, the original collection – now the Hargrett Rare Book and Manuscript Library – has grown, as have the Richard B. Russell Library for Political Research and Studies, the Walter J. Brown Media Archives, and the Peabody Awards Collection. In January 2010, UGA President Michael Adams, members of the Russell Foundation, the family of the late Senator Richard B. Russell, UGA Library staff, and special donors and friends broke ground for a new 115,000-square-foot (10,700 m^{2}) structure located on the northwest side of the University of Georgia campus.

== Exhibits ==
Dedicated to sharing information about Georgia's modern political life and culture, the Russell Library develops exhibits that engage with the past, present, and future. Artist Art Rosenbaum's mural Doors is the centerpiece of the Russell Library gallery, featuring a panoramic view of Georgia history since 1900.

The exhibit space features a replica of the office of Senator Richard B. Russell Jr. It provides a representation of the senator's Washington office that includes much of his original furniture, photographs, books, and memorabilia.

The curatorial staff at the Russell Library researches, develops, and fabricates exhibits in consultation with scholars and community experts. The Russell Library also develops online exhibits to complement exhibits on physical display in the gallery space.

== Collections ==
Library holdings complement course work in history, political science, international affairs, social sciences education, sociology, law, journalism, speech communication, economics, and environmental studies. Research strengths include the U.S. Congress, national defense, foreign policy, civil rights, jurisprudence, agricultural economics and land use, public works, and public policy formation.

Russell Library holdings include the documents of politicians such as Governors Sonny Perdue, Zell Miller, Carl Sanders, Ernest Vandiver, Ellis Arnall, Lester Maddox, and Jimmy Carter, as well as Max Cleland, Mack Mattingly, Buddy Darden, J. Roy Rowland, Bo Callaway, and Don Johnson.

=== Oral history projects ===
- Reflections on Georgia Politics Oral History Collection, an ongoing collection consisting of over 160 video recorded interviews with politically prominent Georgians conducted by Bob Short since 2007.
- First Person Project, an ongoing collection that gathers personal narratives and oral histories documenting life in the twentieth and twenty-first centuries.
- Dean Rusk Oral History Collection, consisting of 172 audio-recorded oral history interviews with Dean Rusk and his colleagues recorded between 1984 and 1989.
- D.W. Brooks Oral History Collection, consisting primarily of audio-recorded oral history interviews with D.W. Brooks conducted by Brian S. Wills in 1987–1988
- Richard B. Russell Jr. Oral History Project, consisting of 175 audio-recorded oral history interviews relating to the personal and political life of Senator Richard B. Russell.
- Harold Paulk Henderson Sr. Oral History Collection, consisting of research retired political science professor Hal Henderson conducted for two books on Georgia governors, one on Ellis Arnall and the other on Ernest Vandiver.
- Richard B. Russell Library Oral History Documentary Collection, consisting of a variety of topics including the desegregation of UGA, the incorporation of Sandy Springs, and key figures in Georgia politics.
- Martin J. Hillenbrand Oral History Collection, consisting of 18 audio recorded interviews conducted by John Stark with former U.S. Ambassador Dr. Martin J. Hillenbrand.
