= Nikolay Vtorov =

Russian industrialist (1866–1918)

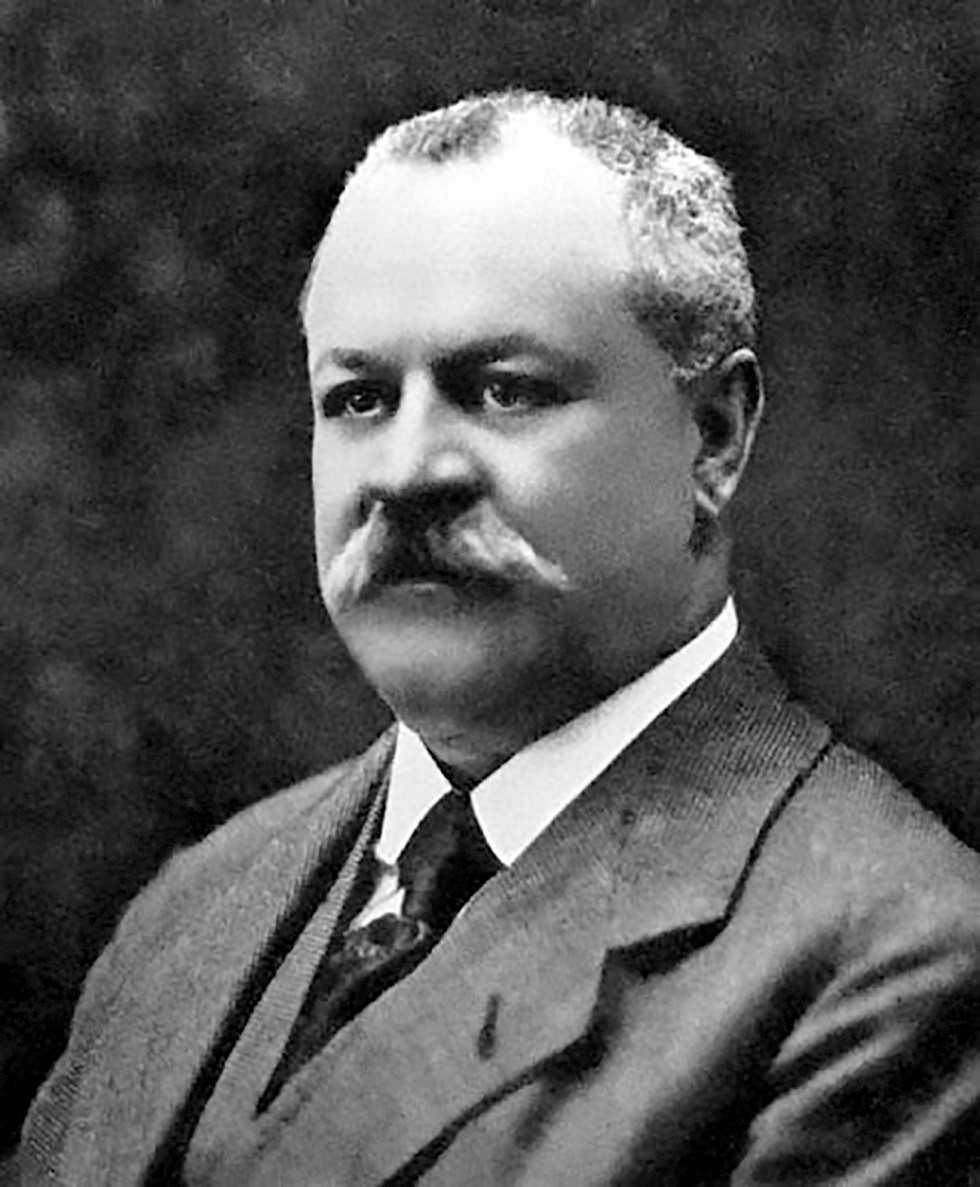
- Vtorov in 1917
- Born: Nikolay Alexandrovich Vtorov; 27 April 1866; Irkutsk, Irkutsk Governorate, Russian Empire
- Died: 20 May 1918 (aged 52); Moscow, Russian SFSR
- Resting place: Skorbyashensky Monastery; Moscow, Russia; 55°47′21″N 37°35′32″E
- Occupation: Entrepreneur
- Parent(s): Alexander Fedorovich Vtorov; Claudia Yakovlevny Malkov

Nikolay Alexandrovich Vtorov (Russian: Никола́й Алекса́ндрович Вто́ров; 27 April [O.S. 15 April] 1866 – 20 May 1918) was an industrialist from the Russian Empire. According to a 2006 Forbes study, which excluded the ruling House of Romanov, he held the title of Russia's wealthiest man on the eve of World War I, owning an estimated 60 million rubles in gold.

== Biography ==
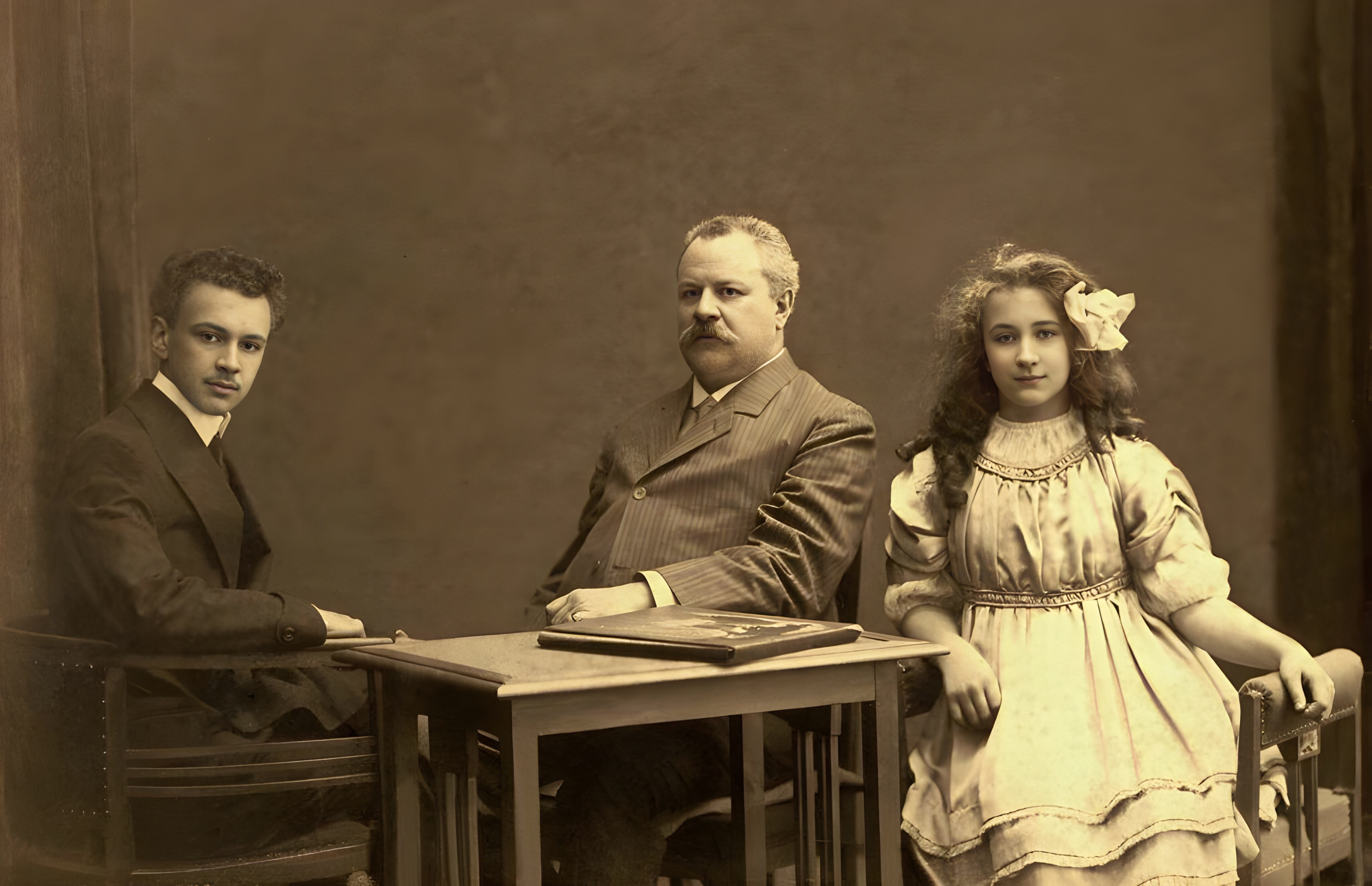
Vtorov family: Boris, Nikolay and Olga

=== Life and career ===
Nikolay owed his fortune to his father, Alexander Vtorov, a successful Irkutsk businessman who set up a trans-Siberian retail shopping network. Upon his death in 1911, Alexander Vtorov's net worth was estimated at 13.6 million roubles; it passed to Nikolay and his lesser-known brother, who had lived in Moscow since 1897. Nikolay Vtorov used his father's fortune to take over numerous banks and manufacturing companies; his aggressive takeover policies earned him the nickname of "the Russian Morgan". He has been called "the first to break the age-old traditions in favour of a rational and intelligent organization of commercial business".

Upon Russia's entry into World War I, Vtorov became one of the major military contractors for the tsarist government, amassing huge state subsidies to build new manufacturing plants in central Russia; he was the de facto defence industry manager for the whole of the Moscow region.

=== Death and legacy ===
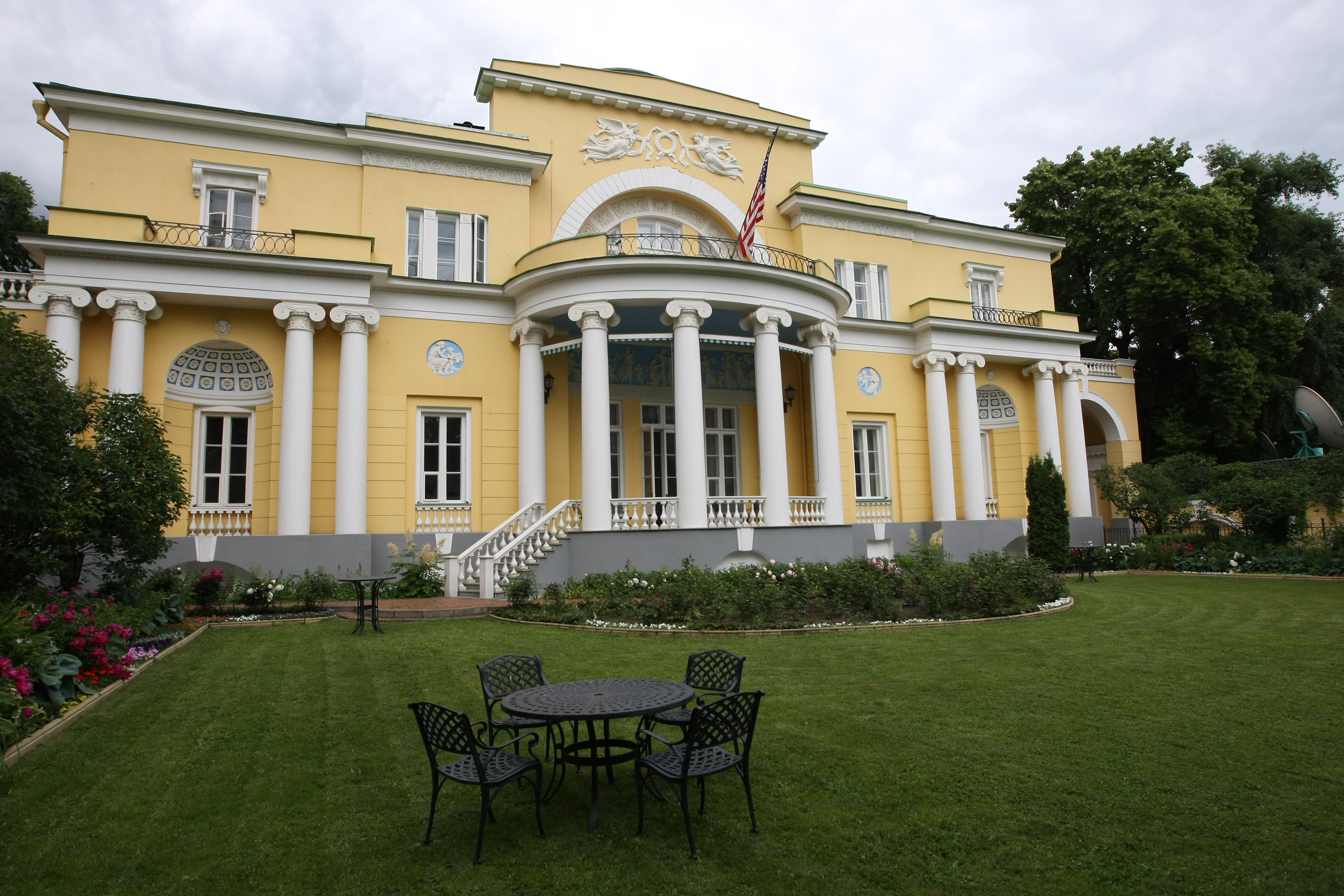
Vtorov's home (Spaso House)

Vtorov decided to stay in Russia after the 1917 Revolution and pledged loyalty to the Bolshevik regime. Less than a year later, in May 1918, he was assassinated; the exact circumstances of his death remain unknown. He was buried in the cemetery of the now-defunct Skorbyashensky Monastery in Moscow.

Many of Vtorov's largest wartime projects, inherited by the Soviets, are still in operation:

- City of Elektrostal (former Zatishye) foundries and defence plants
- City of Noginsk (former Bogorodsk) foundries and defence plants
- Zavod Imeni Likhacheva (Originally AMO truck company) defunct since 2012. Legacy; MSTs6 AMOZIL company

Lesser-known Vtorov plants are still operating all over the city of Moscow. Many have been converted into offices and shopping malls.

Vtorov's former residence, Spaso House, was seized by the Soviet government in 1918 and has since housed the United States Ambassador to the Soviet Union (1933–1991) and United States Ambassador to the Russian Federation (1991–present).

== See also ==
- List of unsolved murders (1900–1979)
