= George S. Vest =

American diplomat (1918–2021)

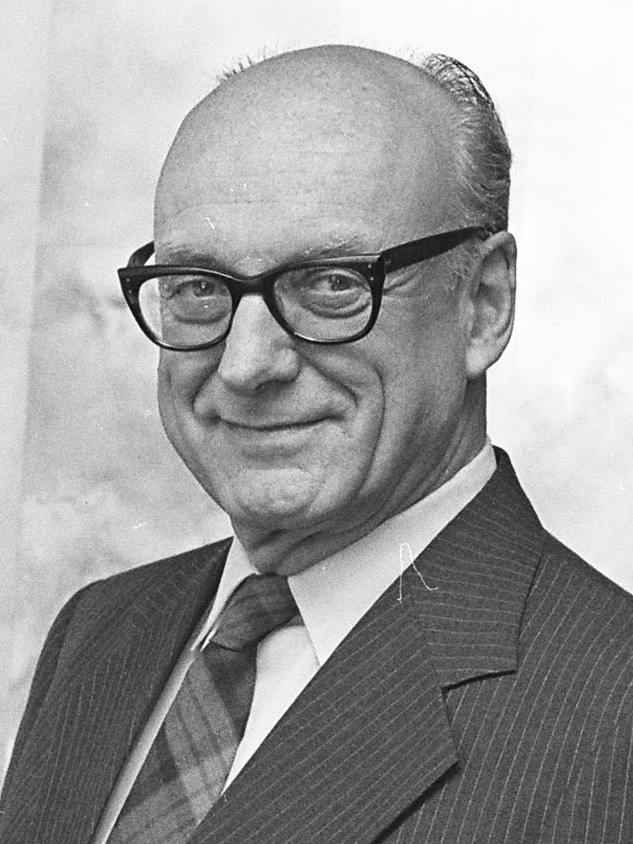
- Vest in 1982

United States Ambassador to the European Union
- In office January 22, 1981 – July 19, 1985
- President: Ronald Reagan
- Preceded by: Thomas O. Enders
- Succeeded by: J. William Middendorf

11th Assistant Secretary of State for European Affairs
- In office June 16, 1977 – April 14, 1981
- Preceded by: Arthur A. Hartman
- Succeeded by: Lawrence Eagleburger

18th Director General of the Foreign Service
- In office June 8, 1984 – May 3, 1989
- Preceded by: Alfred Atherton
- Succeeded by: Edward Joseph Perkins

3rd Director of the Bureau of Political-Military Affairs
- In office April 29, 1974 – March 27, 1977
- Preceded by: Seymour Weiss
- Succeeded by: Leslie H. Gelb

Personal details
- Born: George Southall Vest; December 25, 1918 Columbia, Virginia, U.S.
- Died: August 24, 2021 (aged 102) Bethesda, Maryland, U.S.
- Spouse: Emily Clemons (m. 1947; died 2015)
- Children: 3
- Education: University of Virginia

George Southall Vest (December 25, 1918 – August 24, 2021) was an American diplomat and government official. He served as the 3rd Director of the Bureau of Political-Military Affairs from 1974 to 1977 and as United States ambassador to the European Community from 1981 to 1985.

== Life and career ==
Ambassador George S. Vest, former Director General of the United States Foreign Service, US Ambassador to the European Community, and Assistant Secretary of State for European Affairs, is one of only sixty Foreign Service Officers to reach the rank of Career Ambassador in the history of the US Foreign Service.

George Vest was born in Columbia, Virginia, the son of Nancy Margaret (Robertson) and The Rev. George Southall Vest. He was educated at the Episcopal High School in Alexandria, Virginia, and the University of Virginia, where he graduated with a B.A. in 1941.

Volunteering for the United States Army after graduation, Vest participated in the North African landings in 1942, and served as a forward artillery observer in the Italian campaign in US Army's advance up the spine of Italy. He left the Army in 1946, having attained the rank of captain. Vest returned to the University of Virginia and received an M.A. in 1947.

In 1947, Vest joined the United States Foreign Service. His first post was as a consular officer in Hamilton, Bermuda. He said later that it was the only time in his career that he "wore the proverbial striped pants". In 1949, he became a consular officer in Quito, a post he held until 1952, at which time he went to Canada as a political officer at the Embassy of the United States in Ottawa.

In 1954, Vest became the Canadian Desk officer at the United States Department of State in Washington, D.C.; he later served as special assistant to the Assistant Secretary of State for European Affairs.

In 1959, Vest was posted to Paris as a political officer at Supreme Headquarters Allied Powers Europe, where he served as Political Advisor to US General Lauris Norstad, the Supreme Allied Commander Europe and, in 1960, as a political officer with the United States mission to NATO. He was then Chief of the Private Office for the Secretary General of NATO (Dirk Stikker) from 1961 to 1963.

Vest spent 1963-1964 studying at the Naval War College.

In 1965–1967, he was deputy director of the State Department's Office of Atlantic Political-Military Affairs. In 1967, he moved to Brussels as Deputy Chief of Mission of the United States Mission to the European Commission, a post he held until 1969, when he became Deputy Chief of Mission of the United States Mission to NATO in Brussels. Vest spent 1972–1973 as chief negotiator to the Conference on Security and Co-operation in Europe, which led to the Helsinki Accords signed in 1975.

Vest returned to Washington, D.C., in 1973 to become Deputy Assistant Secretary of State for Press Relations for Henry Kissinger. In 1974, President of the United States Richard Nixon nominated Vest as Assistant Secretary of State for Politico-Military Affairs; he subsequently held this office from April 29, 1974, until March 27, 1977. On April 7, 1977, President Jimmy Carter nominated Vest as United States Ambassador to Pakistan, but this nomination was withdrawn on May 5, 1977. Carter then nominated Vest as Assistant Secretary of State for European Affairs and Vest held this office from June 16, 1977, until April 14, 1981.

In 1981, President Ronald Reagan nominated Vest as United States Ambassador to the European Communities. He held this post until 1985, when Reagan named Vest Director General of the Foreign Service; he held this office from June 8, 1985, until May 3, 1989. Vest was made a Career Ambassador in 1987.

His wife, Emily Clemons Vest, died in 2015. They had been married for sixty-eight years and she accompanied him on his many diplomatic posts. Mrs. Vest, a 1942 graduate of Smith College, grew up in Charlottesville, Virginia, where her father served as Librarian of the University of Virginia. The university's Clemons Library is named in his honor.

Vest retired in 1989, and remained a member of the Council on Foreign Relations. He died in August 2021 at the age of 102.

Government offices
Preceded by Seymour Weiss	Director of the Bureau of Politico-Military Affairs; April 29, 1974 – March 27, 1977	Succeeded by Leslie H. Gelb
Preceded by Arthur A. Hartman	Assistant Secretary of State for European Affairs; June 16, 1977 – April 14, 1981	Succeeded by Lawrence Eagleburger
Preceded by Alfred Atherton	Director General of the Foreign Service; June 8, 1985 – May 3, 1989	Succeeded by Edward J. Perkins
Diplomatic posts
Preceded by Thomas O. Enders	United States Ambassador to the European Union; 1981 – 1985	Succeeded by J. William Middendorf
