= John M. Leddy =

American civil servant (1914–1997)

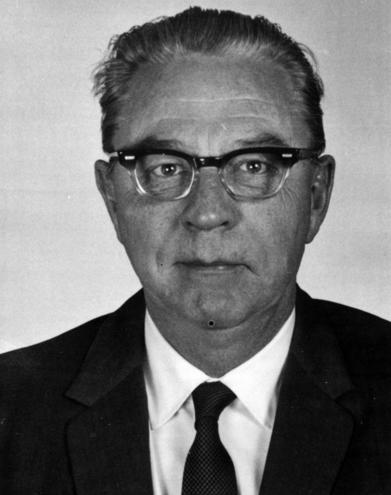

2nd United States Ambassador to the Organisation for Economic Co-operation and Development
- In office October 3, 1962 – June 15, 1965
- President: John F. Kennedy
- Preceded by: John W. Tuthill
- Succeeded by: Philip Trezise

7th Assistant Secretary of State for European Affairs
- In office June 16, 1965 – February 19, 1969
- Preceded by: William R. Tyler
- Succeeded by: Martin J. Hillenbrand

Personal details
- Born: June 29, 1914 Chicago, Illinois
- Died: August 31, 1997 (aged 83)
- Education: Georgetown University

John Marshall Leddy (June 29, 1914 – August 31, 1997) was an official in the United States Department of State, who mainly focused on U.S. trade policy.

== Biography ==
John M. Leddy was born in Chicago and raised in Miami Beach, Florida. After high school, Leddy took a short business course in Miami, Florida, and then, in 1933, moved to Washington, D.C., to live with an aunt. During this time, Leddy worked at the Home Owners' Loan Corporation and later the Pan American Union during the day, and took classes at Georgetown University at night. At the Pan American Union, he worked in the division of financial and economic information, specializing in economic information about Latin America.

After college, Leddy took a job with the Trade Agreements Division of the United States Department of State in 1941. His work initially focused on U.S. trade with Peru and Mexico. He then worked with State Department lawyer Marc Catudal, an expert on the most favored nation clause, on the legal framework for trade agreements.

After World War II, Leddy worked with the Trade Agreements Committee, an interagency committee that was involved in developing U.S. postwar trade policy, in particular the negotiation of the General Agreement on Tariffs and Trade and the creation of the International Trade Organization in 1947. He worked at the Department of State on trade issues until 1958. He then spent a few years at The Fletcher School of Law and Diplomacy.

In 1961, President of the United States John F. Kennedy named Leddy as Assistant Secretary of the Treasury for International Affairs. On October 2, 1962, President Kennedy appointed Leddy as United States Ambassador to the Organisation for Economic Co-operation and Development; Leddy held this post until June 15, 1965. President Lyndon B. Johnson nominated him as Assistant Secretary of State for European Affairs in 1965, with Leddy holding this office from June 16, 1965, until February 19, 1969.

== Publications by John M. Leddy ==
- John M. Leddy, "GATT—A Cohesive Influence in the Free World", Journal of Farm Economics (May 1958)
- John M. Leddy and Janet L. Norwood, "United States Commercial Policy and the Domestic Farm Program", ch. 4 of Studies in United States Commercial Policy, ed. William B. Kelly Jr. (1962)
- John M. Leddy, "The United States, the European Community, and Prospects for a New World Economic Order", Law & Contemporary Problems (Spring 1972)

Diplomatic posts
Preceded by John W. Tuthill	United States Ambassador to the Organisation for Economic Co-operation and Development; October 3, 1962 – June 15, 1965	Succeeded by Philip H. Trezise
Government offices
Preceded by William R. Tyler	Assistant Secretary of State for European Affairs; June 16, 1965 – February 19, 1969	Succeeded by Martin J. Hillenbrand
