= Foy D. Kohler =

American diplomat

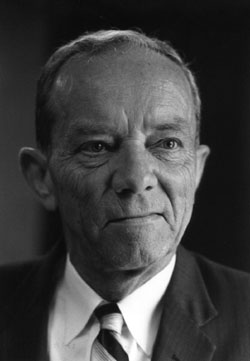

11th United States Ambassador to the Soviet Union
- In office September 27, 1962 – November 14, 1966
- President: John F. Kennedy; Lyndon B. Johnson
- Preceded by: Llewellyn Thompson
- Succeeded by: Llewellyn Thompson

5th Assistant Secretary of State for European Affairs
- In office December 11, 1959 – August 19, 1962
- President: Dwight D. Eisenhower; John F. Kennedy
- Preceded by: Livingston T. Merchant
- Succeeded by: William R. Tyler

Personal details
- Born: February 15, 1908 Oakwood, Ohio, U.S.
- Died: December 23, 1990 (aged 82) Jupiter, Florida, U.S.
- Spouse: Phyllis Penn
- Profession: Diplomat

Foy David Kohler (February 15, 1908 – December 23, 1990) was an American diplomat who was the United States Ambassador to the Soviet Union during the Cuban Missile Crisis.

== Early life ==
Kohler was born in Oakwood, Ohio but the family moved to Toledo when he was young. He attended the University of Toledo and Ohio State University, where he graduated in 1931 with a BS in foreign studies.

He entered the Foreign Service and served in Windsor (Canada), Belgrade (Yugoslavia), and Bucharest (Romania). He married Phyllis Penn of Greensboro, North Carolina in Bucharest in 1935. Later they served in Athens (Greece), Cairo (Egypt), Vietnam, and Bolivia.

At the end of World War II, Kohler served as the assistant chief of the Foreign Service's Division of Near Eastern Affairs.

Kohler studied Russian at Cornell University in 1946 and then had his first tour in Moscow from 1947-49 working for Ambassador Walter Bedell Smith.

== Ambassador to the Soviet Union ==
Following a tour as Director of Voice of America, in September 1962 President John F. Kennedy named Kohler Ambassador to the Soviet Union. He and his wife moved to Spaso House, the U.S. Ambassador’s residence in Moscow, and began a complete remodeling of the mansion.

In just a few weeks the Cuban Missile Crisis began and Kohler found himself engaged in defusing a serious international crisis. The Americans had found that the Soviets were placing nuclear missiles in Cuba. Soviet Premier Nikita Khrushchev was not well acquainted with Kohler, and what little Khrushchev did know about him he disliked. As a result, there was little that Kohler could have done to influence Khrushchev one way or another. Even so, Kohler proved useful by efficiently transmitting important messages between the White House and the Kremlin. After two weeks of tension over the risk of escalation, Khrushchev agreed to remove the missiles.

The experience convinced both sides of the need for better communications. On June 20, 1963, the two countries agreed to set up a continuous connection over a secure transatlantic cable, as a "hot line" for use in times of emergency.

On August 5, 1963, the Limited Test Ban Treaty, which banned nuclear testing in the atmosphere, under water, or outer space, was signed in Moscow. This was to be the first in a series of arms control agreements between the superpowers.

On March 6, 1967, Kohler received word that Svetlana Alliluyeva, the daughter of former Soviet leader Joseph Stalin had decided to defect to the U.S. in New Delhi. He had the responsibility to inform the Soviets via their Ambassador to the U.S., Anatoly Dobrynin.

Kohler retired from the foreign service in 1967 with the personal rank of Career Ambassador.

== After government service ==
The Kohlers moved to Florida and he became a professor of international studies at the Center for Advanced International Studies of the University of Miami.

He died December 23, 1990. He and Phyllis never had children. He was a member of the Council on Foreign Relations, Beta Gamma Sigma, Delta Upsilon, and Phi Beta Kappa.

== Works ==
=== Articles ===
- "The Effectiveness of the Voice of America." Quarterly of Film Radio and Television, vol. 6, no. 1 (Autumn 1951), pp. 20–29. JSTOR 1209931. doi:10.2307/1209931.
- "The International Significance of the Lunar Landing," with Dodd L. Harvey. Journal of Interamerican Studies and World Affairs, vol. 12, no. 1 (Jan. 1970), pp. 3–30. JSTOR 174840. doi:10.2307/174840.

== Notes ==
Government offices
Preceded by Livingston T. Merchant	Assistant Secretary of State for European Affairs; December 11, 1959 – August 19, 1962	Succeeded by William R. Tyler
Diplomatic posts
Preceded by Llewellyn Thompson	United States Ambassador to the Soviet Union; 1962–1966	Succeeded by Llewellyn Thompson
