= John W. Tuthill =

American diplomat

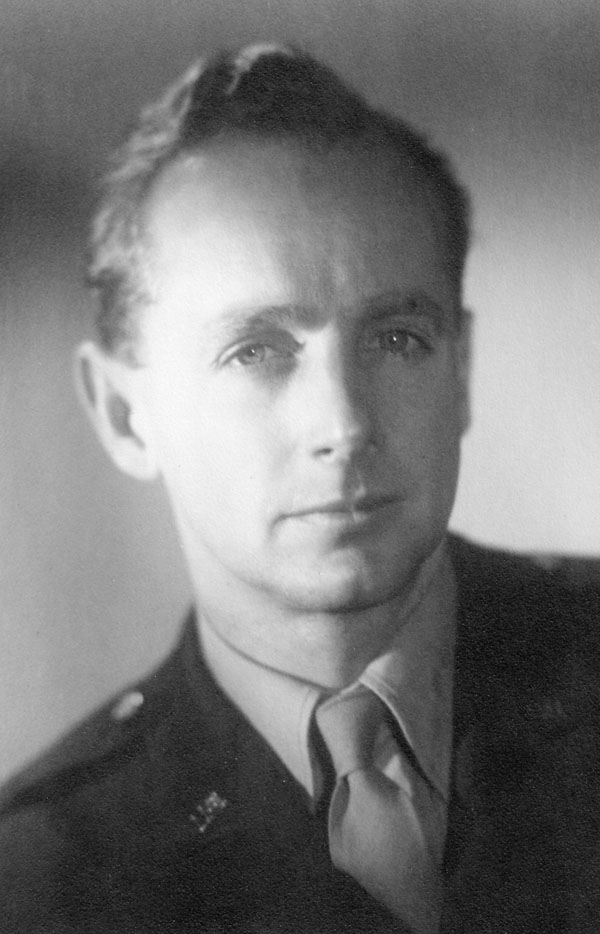

1st United States Ambassador to the Organisation for Economic Co-operation and Development
- In office October 4, 1961 – October 22, 1962
- President: John F. Kennedy
- Preceded by: Position established
- Succeeded by: John M. Leddy

United States Ambassador to Brazil
- In office June 30, 1966 – January 9, 1969
- President: Lyndon B. Johnson
- Preceded by: Lincoln Gordon
- Succeeded by: Charles Burke Elbrick

Personal details
- Born: November 10, 1910 Montclair, New Jersey, U.S.
- Died: September 9, 1996 (aged 85) U.S.
- Spouse: Erna Margaret Lueders
- Children: Carol Ann; David Wills
- Education: College of William and Mary; New York University; Harvard University

John Wills Tuthill (November 10, 1910 – September 9, 1996) was a U.S. career diplomat who was stationed in Latin America, Canada, and Europe.

Born in Montclair, New Jersey to Mr. & Mrs. Oliver Bailey Tuthill of North Caldwell. Married Erna Margaret Lueders, daughter of Mr. and Mrs. Edward Lueders of Essex Fells, in St. Luke's Church in Montclair on July 4, 1937, by the Rev. Ernest Tuthill, uncle of the bridegroom. Children are daughter Carol Ann and son David Wills.

Graduated from the College of William and Mary class of 1932, received graduate degrees from New York University master's in business administration and master's degree in economics from Harvard. He received the Alumni Medallion from the College of William and Mary in 1968 and an honorary LLD in 1978. A quarterback during his college years, Jack Tuthill was named a Sports Illustrated Special All American in 1956. Taught banking and finance for two years at Northeastern University in Boston before joining the U.S. Foreign Service in 1940.

His diplomatic career extended from 1940 to 1969. Was stationed in Ottawa Canada as Vice Consul in 1943. He served in Mexico before being assigned to London on the staff of Supreme Headquarters, Allied Expeditionary Force, under the command of U.S. Army Gen. Dwight D. Eisenhower. Was an aide to General George C. Marshall in 1947 and stationed in Bonn Germany. Active in developing the Marshall Plan's Organization for European Economic Cooperation (OEEC). Became U.S. Ambassador to the OECD in Paris from 1960 to 1962. He served as the United States Ambassador to the European Economic Community in Brussels from 1962 to 1966. Was U.S. Ambassador to Brazil, 1966 to 1969.

After retiring from the Foreign Service Ambassador Tuthill was a professor of international politics at the Bologna Center of the Johns Hopkins University. Was Director General of the Atlantic Institute for International Affairs in Paris from 1969 to 1975. From 1976 until returning to Washington area in 1988, he served as the fifth president of the Salzburg Global Seminar a non-profit organization based in Salzburg, Austria whose mission is to challenge current and future leaders to develop creative ideas for solving global problems. Became the executive director of the American-Austrian Foundation.

He was the author of several books on banking and foreign economic relations. His autobiography, Some Things to Some Men: Serving in the Foreign Service, appeared in 1996.

== See also ==
- List of ambassadors of the United States to the Organisation for Economic Co-operation and Development

Diplomatic posts
Preceded by Lincoln Gordon	United States Ambassador to Brazil; 1966–1969	Succeeded by Charles Burke Elbrick
