= Assistant Secretary of State for European and Eurasian Affairs =

Position in the U.S. Department of State

United States Assistant Secretary of State for European and Eurasian Affairs
- Seal of the United States Department of State

- Flag of an Assistant Secretary of State

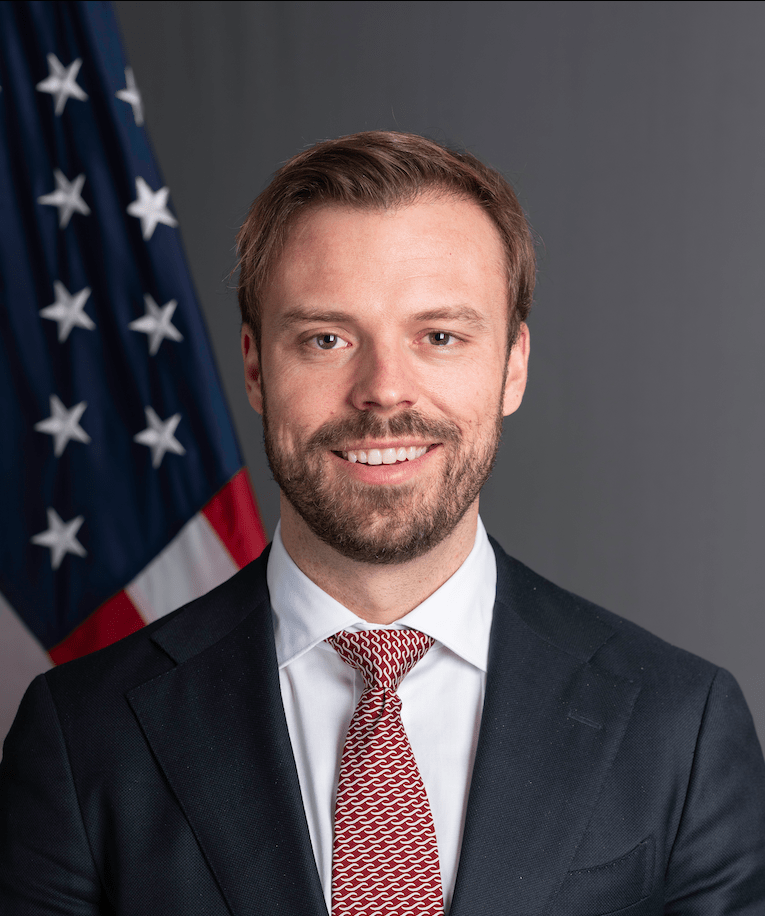
- Incumbent; Brendan Hanrahan since August 24, 2026
- Reports to: Under Secretary of State for Political Affairs
- Nominator: President of the United States
- Inaugural holder: George Walbridge Perkins Jr.
- Formation: August 1949
- Website: Official website

The Assistant Secretary of State for European and Eurasian Affairs is a position within the United States Department of State that leads the Bureau of European and Eurasian Affairs charged with implementing American foreign policy in Europe and Eurasia, and with advising the under secretary for political affairs on matters relating to diplomatic missions within that area.

Originally, the Department of State first established a Division of Western European Affairs in 1909, which handled European states primarily bordering on the Atlantic Ocean and their colonies. The Division of Near Eastern Affairs handled relations with most Central, Eastern, and Southern European countries until after World War I. During the interwar period, responsibility for much of Central and Eastern Europe shifted to the Division of European Affairs, although Greece, Turkey, and Cyprus were handled as part of the Near East until April 18, 1974. Following World War II, the department completed the transfer of responsibility for the former colonies of European nations, except Canada, to the Bureaus of Near Eastern, South Asian, African Affairs, and Far Eastern Affairs.

The Department of State later established the Assistant Secretary of State for European Affairs in 1949. This came after the Commission on Organization of the Executive Branch of Government, also known as the Hoover Commission, recommended that certain offices be upgraded to bureau level after Congress had increased the number of Assistant Secretaries of State from six to ten. On September 14, 1983, an administrative action changed the title of the incumbent to Assistant Secretary of State for European and Canadian Affairs. On January 12, 1999, the title was changed back to Assistant Secretary for European Affairs.

== Officeholders ==
#	Name	Assumed office	Left office	President served under
Assistant Secretaries of State for European Affairs
1	George Walbridge Perkins, Jr.	August 1, 1949	January 31, 1953	Harry S. Truman
2	Livingston T. Merchant	March 16, 1953	May 6, 1956	Dwight D. Eisenhower
-	James Williams Riddleberger			Dwight D. Eisenhower
3	Charles Burke Elbrick	February 14, 1957	November 16, 1958	Dwight D. Eisenhower
4	Livingston T. Merchant	November 18, 1958	August 20, 1959	Dwight D. Eisenhower
-	Walter C. Dowling			Dwight D. Eisenhower
5	Foy D. Kohler	December 11, 1959	August 19, 1962	Dwight D. Eisenhower and John F. Kennedy
6	William R. Tyler	September 2, 1962	May 18, 1965	John F. Kennedy and Lyndon B. Johnson
7	John M. Leddy	June 16, 1965	February 19, 1969	Lyndon B. Johnson
8	Martin J. Hillenbrand	February 20, 1969	April 30, 1972	Richard Nixon
9	Walter John Stoessel Jr.	August 9, 1972	January 7, 1974	Richard Nixon
10	Arthur A. Hartman	January 8, 1974	June 8, 1977	Richard Nixon and Gerald Ford
11	George S. Vest	June 16, 1977	April 14, 1981	Jimmy Carter
12	Lawrence Eagleburger	May 14, 1981	January 26, 1982	Ronald Reagan
Assistant Secretaries of State for European and Canadian Affairs
13	Richard R. Burt	February 18, 1983	July 18, 1985	Ronald Reagan
14	Rozanne L. Ridgway	July 19, 1985	June 30, 1989	Ronald Reagan
15	Raymond G. H. Seitz	August 8, 1989	April 30, 1991	George H. W. Bush
16	Thomas Niles	October 3, 1991	April 1, 1993	George H. W. Bush
17	Stephen A. Oxman	April 2, 1993	August 15, 1994	Bill Clinton
18	Richard Holbrooke	September 13, 1994	February 21, 1996	Bill Clinton
19	John C. Kornblum	July 3, 1996	August 1, 1997	Bill Clinton
20	Marc Grossman	August 5, 1997	May 31, 2000	Bill Clinton
Assistant Secretaries of State for European Affairs
20	Marc Grossman	August 5, 1997	May 31, 2000	Bill Clinton
21	James F. Dobbins	January 4, 2001	June 1, 2001	Bill Clinton and George W. Bush
22	A. Elizabeth Jones	June 1, 2001	February 28, 2005	George W. Bush
Assistant Secretaries of State for European and Eurasian Affairs
22	A. Elizabeth Jones	June 1, 2001	February 28, 2005	George W. Bush
23	Daniel Fried	May 5, 2005	January 20, 2009	George W. Bush
24	Philip H. Gordon	May 15, 2009	March 11, 2013	Barack Obama
25	Victoria Nuland	September 18, 2013	January 20, 2017	Barack Obama
-	John A. Heffern (acting)	January 20, 2017	August 23, 2017	Donald Trump
26	A. Wess Mitchell	October 12, 2017	February 15, 2019	Donald Trump
-	Michael Murphy (Senior Bureau Official)	February 18, 2019	March 18, 2019	Donald Trump
-	Philip T. Reeker (acting)	March 18, 2019	July 31, 2021	Donald Trump
-	Philip T. Reeker (acting)	March 18, 2019	July 31, 2021	Joe Biden
-	Maureen Cormack (acting)	August 2, 2021	September 28, 2021	Joe Biden
27	Karen Donfried	September 30, 2021	March 31, 2023	Joe Biden
-	Dereck J. Hogan (acting)	April 1, 2023	July 10, 2023	Joe Biden
-	Yuri Kim (acting)	July 10, 2023	October 5, 2023	Joe Biden
28	James C. O'Brien	October 5, 2023	January 20, 2025	Joe Biden
-	Louis L. Bono (acting)	January 20, 2025	April 25, 2025	Donald Trump
-	Brendan Hanrahan (acting)	April 25, 2025	April 20, 2026	Donald Trump
-	Arthur Milikh (acting)	April 20, 2026	August 24, 2026	Donald Trump
29	Brendan Hanrahan	August 24, 2026	Present	Donald Trump
