= William R. Tyler =

American diplomat

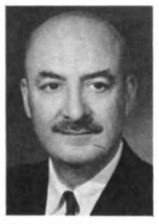

US Ambassador to the Netherlands
- In office June 23, 1965 – June 20, 1969
- President: Lyndon B. Johnson
- Preceded by: John S. Rice
- Succeeded by: J. William Middendorf II

6th Assistant Secretary of State for European Affairs
- In office September 2, 1962 – May 18, 1965
- Preceded by: Foy D. Kohler
- Succeeded by: John M. Leddy

Personal details
- Born: October 17, 1910 Paris, France
- Died: November 16, 2003 (aged 93) Bristol, Vermont, U.S.
- Relations: Louis Bonaparte (great-great-great-grandfather); Francois de Castelvecchio (great-great-grandfather)
- Parent(s): Royall Tyler; Elisina de Castelvecchio
- Education: Oxford University; Harvard University (MFA)

William Royall Tyler (October 17, 1910 – November 16, 2003) was a United States diplomat. He served as the United States Ambassador to the Netherlands from 1965 to 1969.

== Biography ==
William Royall Tyler was born in Paris in 1910. His father Royall Tyler (1884–1953) was an American and a descendant of Royall Tyler (1757–1826). His mother was an Italian, Countess Elisina de Castelvecchio. His mother was the great-great-granddaughter of Louis Bonaparte, descending from Louis Bonaparte's illegitimate son François de Castelvecchio (1826–1869). Tyler was educated at Balliol College, Oxford.

After college, Tyler spent five years working as an international banker in England and the United States. He then enrolled in Harvard University, receiving a Master of Fine Arts During World War II, Tyler worked in the United States Office of War Information, first in Algeria, and then as director of the Office of War Information in France.

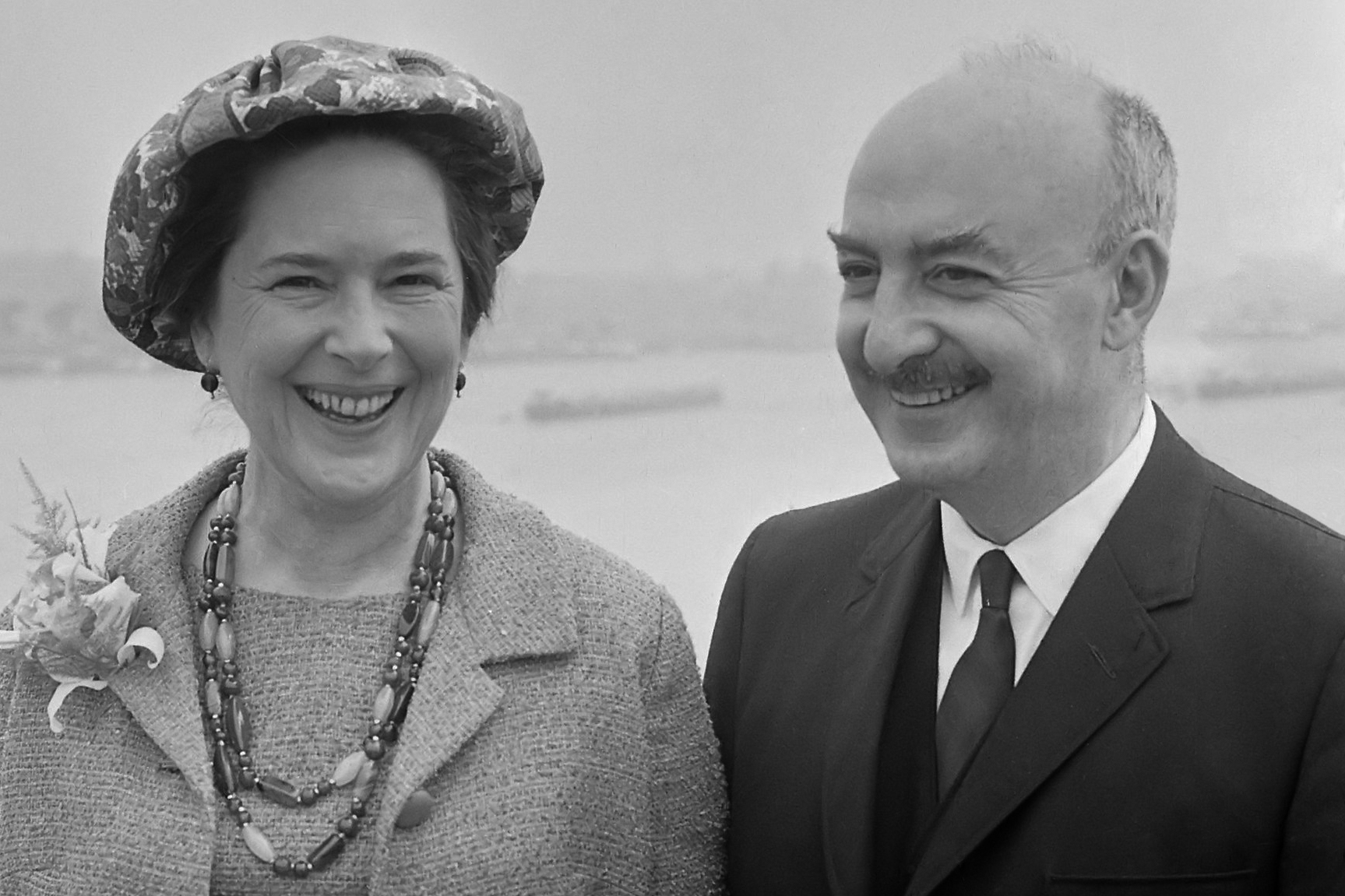
William Tyler, ambassador to the Netherlands, and wife (1965)

After the war, Tyler joined the United States Foreign Service, becoming a career diplomat. As a Foreign Service Officer, he was stationed in Paris, Bonn, and The Hague. In 1962, President of the United States John F. Kennedy nominated Tyler as Assistant Secretary of State for European Affairs, and, after Senate confirmation, Tyler held this office from September 2, 1962 until May 18, 1965. In 1965, President Lyndon B. Johnson named Tyler United States Ambassador to the Netherlands; Tyler held this post from June 23, 1965 through June 20, 1969.

Tyler left government service in 1969, becoming director of the Dumbarton Oaks Research Library and Collection, one of the world's foremost research libraries in the fields of Byzantine studies and Pre-Columbian studies. He retired from this position in 1977.

In retirement, Tyler continued to live in Washington, D.C. until 2003, when he moved to Vermont. He was a long-time member of the Cosmos Club. He died at a nursing facility in Bristol, Vermont on November 16, 2003, after suffering from Alzheimer's and Parkinson's disease. He was 93 years old.

Government offices
| Preceded by Foy D. Kohler | Assistant Secretary of State for European Affairs; September 2, 1962 – May 18, 1965 | Succeeded by John M. Leddy |
Diplomatic posts
| Preceded by John S. Rice | United States Ambassador to the Netherlands; June 23, 1965 – June 20, 1969 | Succeeded by J. William Middendorf |
