= Martin J. Hillenbrand =

American diplomat

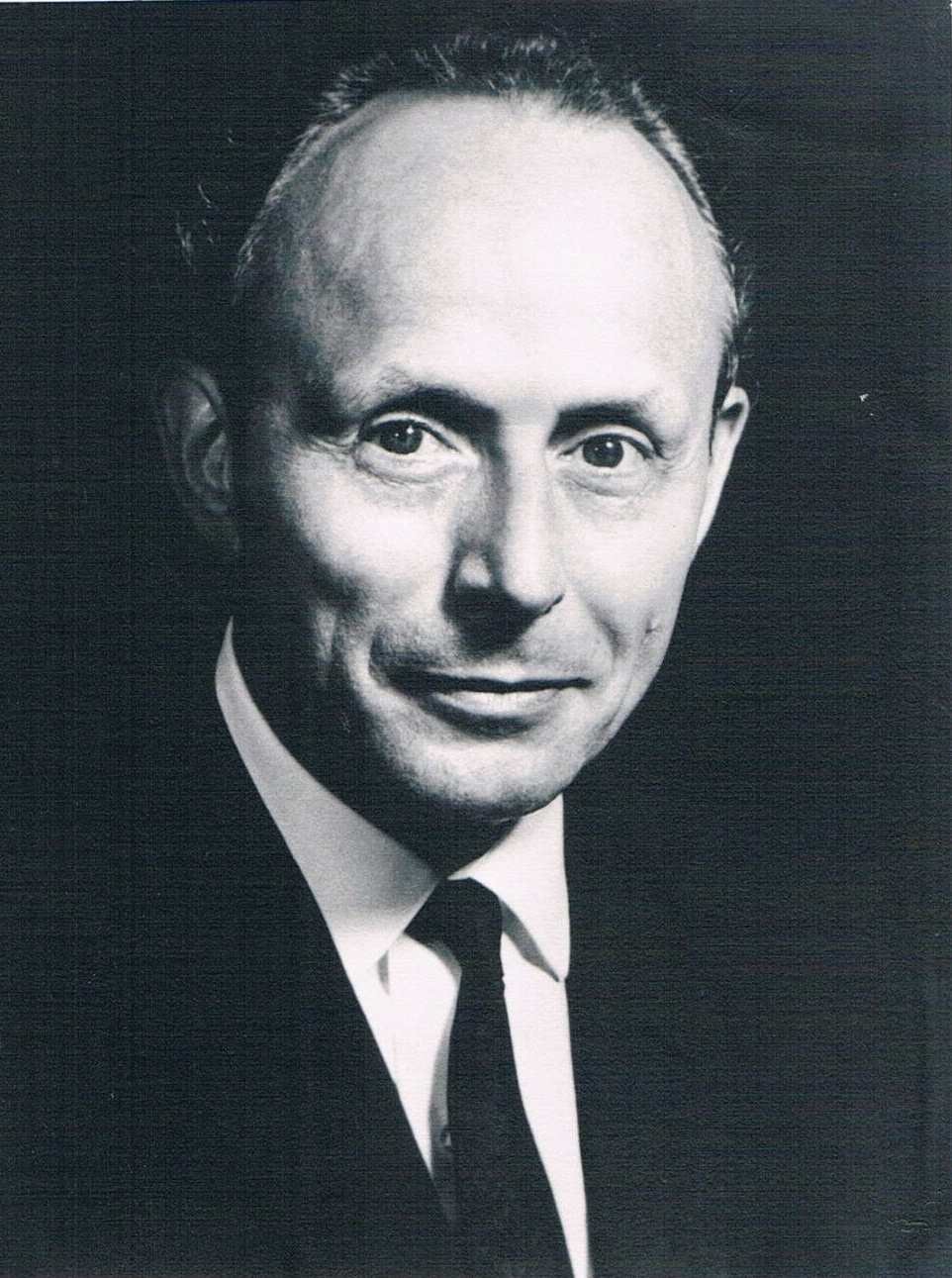

8th Assistant Secretary of State for European Affairs
- In office February 20, 1969 – April 30, 1972
- Preceded by: John M. Leddy
- Succeeded by: Walter John Stoessel Jr.

Personal details
- Born: August 1, 1915 Youngstown, Ohio
- Died: February 2, 2005 (aged 89) Athens, Georgia
- Education: Columbia University (PhD)

Martin Joseph Hillenbrand (August 1, 1915 – February 2, 2005) was an American diplomat who served as the U.S. Ambassador to Hungary from 1967 to 1969, and the Ambassador to the Federal Republic of Germany from 1972 to 1976.

== Life and career ==
Born in Youngstown, Ohio, to a family of German descent, Hillenbrand attained a Ph.D. in 1948 from Columbia University. He became a U.S. foreign service officer almost a decade earlier, entering the U.S. Foreign Service in 1939, and served in multiple positions before being named Assistant Secretary of State for European and Canadian Affairs during the Nixon Administration.

During his 37-year career in the U.S. Foreign Service, he held assignments in Switzerland, Washington, D.C., Burma, India, Portuguese East Africa (now: Mozambique), Germany, France, and Hungary. He served as U.S. ambassador to Hungary from 1967–1969 and later as the U.S. ambassador to the Federal Republic of Germany from June 27, 1972, to October 18, 1976. During his career, Ambassador Hillenbrand developed expertise on European affairs, and he devoted a significant portion of his career to topics related to Germany where he played an instrumental role as a diplomat during the Berlin Crisis from 1958 to 1962.

After retiring from the U.S. Foreign Service, the former ambassador Hillenbrand served as the Director-General of the Atlantic Institute for International Affairs in Paris, France, from 1977-1982. In 1982, Dr. Hillenbrand was named Dean Rusk Professor of International Relations at the University of Georgia and held this position until his retirement from this university in 1997. In his retirement Hillenbrand published his memoirs, titled Fragments of Our Time: Memoirs of a Diplomat.

In 2004, Ambassador Hillenbrand participated in an oral history project that focused on his role and understanding of significant world events during his career in the U.S. Foreign Service and also considered his outlook on the future. Audio and video recordings from this project are housed in the Richard B. Russell Library at the University of Georgia.

Hillenbrand died in Athens, Georgia, on February 2, 2005, at the age of 89.

Diplomatic posts
Preceded by Richard W. Tims	United States Ambassador to Hungary; October 30, 1967 – February 15, 1969	Succeeded by Alfred Puhan
Preceded by Kenneth Rush	United States Ambassador to Germany; June 27, 1972 – October 18, 1976	Succeeded by Walter J. Stoessel, Jr.
Government offices
Preceded by John M. Leddy	Assistant Secretary of State for European Affairs; February 20, 1969 – April 30, 1972	Succeeded by Walter John Stoessel, Jr.
