= Kenneth W. Dam =

American politician (1932–2022)

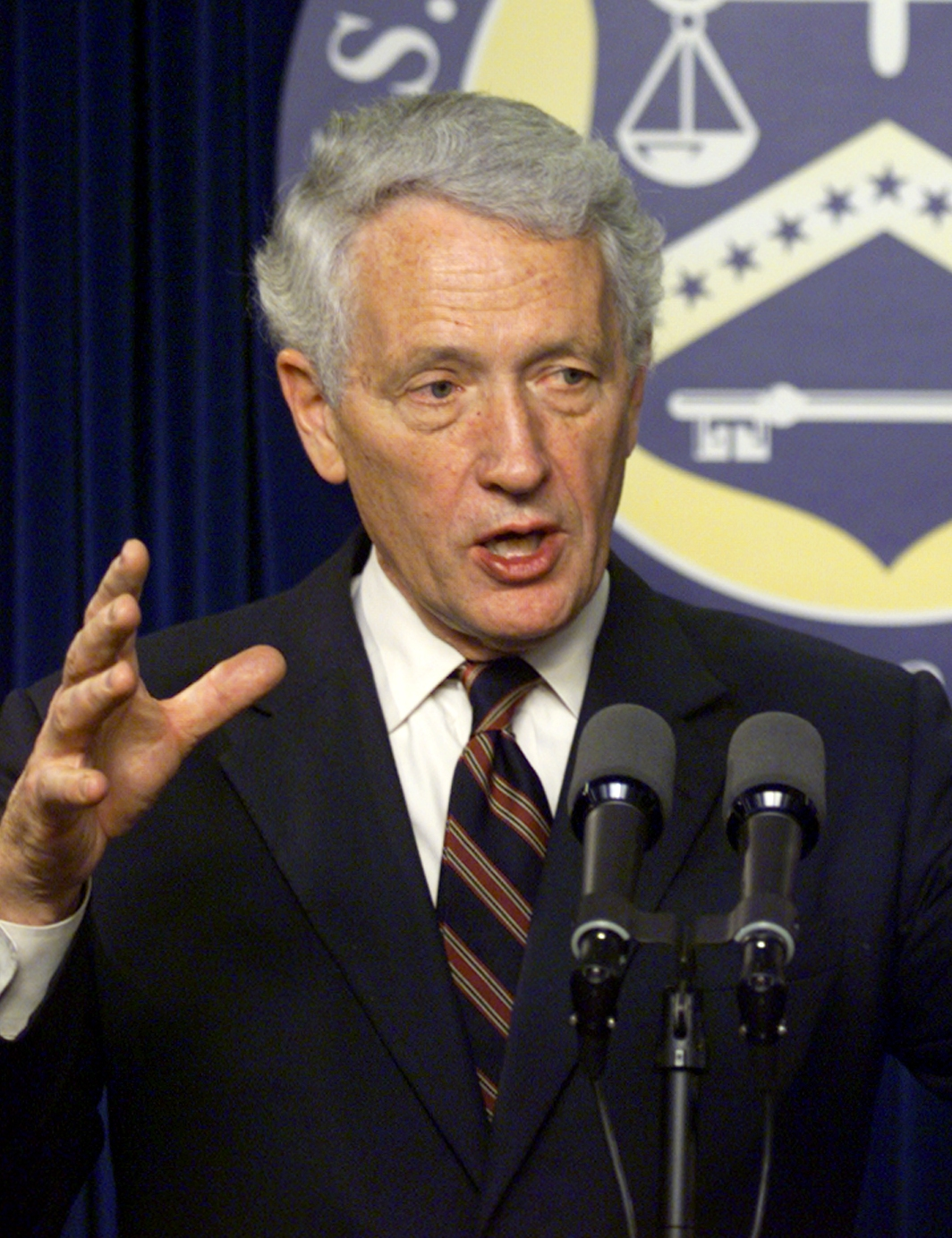

9th United States Deputy Secretary of the Treasury
- In office January 20, 2001 – July 13, 2004
- President: George W. Bush
- Preceded by: Stuart E. Eizenstat
- Succeeded by: Samuel Bodman

Acting United States Secretary of the Treasury
- In office December 31, 2002 – February 3, 2003
- President: George W. Bush
- Preceded by: Paul H. O'Neill (as Secretary of the Treasury)
- Succeeded by: John W. Snow (as Secretary of the Treasury)

8th United States Deputy Secretary of State
- In office September 23, 1982 – June 15, 1985
- President: Ronald Reagan
- Preceded by: Walter J. Stoessel Jr.
- Succeeded by: John C. Whitehead

Personal details
- Born: Kenneth Willard Dam; August 10, 1932 Marysville, Kansas, U.S.
- Died: May 31, 2022 (aged 89) Long Grove, Illinois, U.S.
- Education: University of Kansas (B.A.); University of Chicago Law School (J.D.)

Kenneth Willard Dam (August 10, 1932 – May 31, 2022) was an American politician and academic who served as Deputy Secretary of the Treasury (the second highest official in the United States Department of the Treasury) from 2001 to 2004, where he specialized in international economic development. He was a senior fellow of the Brookings Institution and a professor emeritus and senior lecturer at the University of Chicago Law School.

== Early life and education ==
Kenneth Willard Dam was born in Marysville, Kansas, the son of Ida (Hueppelheiser) and Oliver Dam, a grain and chicken farmer. His grandparents were German and Danish immigrants. He graduated from Marysville High School, in 1950 and from the University of Kansas in 1954, and earned his J.D. degree from the University of Chicago law school in 1957. He then served as a law clerk to United States Supreme Court justice Charles Whittaker in 1957 and 1958. He became an associate at the law firm of Cravath, Swaine & Moore until he joined the University of Chicago as a law professor in 1960, becoming provost in 1980. Dam was a longtime director of the University of Chicago Law School's program in Law & Economics.

== Career ==
Dam held a number of government positions during various Republican administrations while on leave from the University of Chicago:

- Program Assistant Director for national security and international affairs at the Office of Management and Budget (1971–1973)
- Executive Director of the White House Council on Economic Policy (1973)
- Deputy Secretary of State (1982–1985)

After leaving the Reagan administration in 1985, Dam became vice president for law and external relations at IBM until 1992. He served as president and CEO of the United Way of America in 1992, and helped lead an investigation of a highly publicized scandal in the leadership of that organization and reorganize its staff and governance. He then rejoined the University of Chicago law school faculty.

He has also been an arbitrator, most notably from 1996 to 2001 under the collective bargaining agreement between professional basketball players and the National Basketball Association. Dam has served on the board of a number of public policy institutions, including the Council on Foreign Relations, the Chicago Council on Foreign Relations, and the Brookings Institution. He was co-chairman of the Aspen Strategy Group from 1991 to 2001 and was, during 1999 and 2000, chairman of the German-American Academic Council. From 1987 to 2001 he was a member of the board of Alcoa. He is a former member of the Steering Committee of the Bilderberg Group. He first participated in their annual conference in 1983 when he was Under Deputy Secretary of State. He would miss only one conference between 1983 and 1997 and participate again in 2001 and 2002.

== Publications ==
- The Law-Growth Nexus: The Rule of Law and Economic Development, Brookings Institution Press, 2006 ISBN 0-8157-1720-2
- The Rules of the Global Game: A New Look at US International Economic Playmaking, University Of Chicago Press, 2001 ISBN 0-226-13493-8
- Economic Policy Beyond the Headlines, with George P. Shultz, University of Chicago Press, second edition 1998 ISBN 0-226-75599-1
- The Rules of the Game: Reform and Evolution in the International Monetary System, University of Chicago Press, 1982 ISBN 0-226-13499-7
- Oil Resources: Who Gets What How?, University of Chicago Press, 1978 ISBN 0-226-13498-9

== See also ==
- List of law clerks for the sixth seat of the Supreme Court of the United States

Political offices
Preceded by Walter J. Stoessel Jr.	United States Deputy Secretary of State; 1982–1985	Succeeded by John C. Whitehead
Preceded by Stuart E. Eizenstat	United States Deputy Secretary of the Treasury; 2001–2004	Succeeded by Samuel Bodman
Preceded by Paul H. O'Neill	United States Secretary of the Treasury; Acting; 2002–2003	Succeeded by John W. Snow
