= Walter J. Stoessel Jr. =

American diplomat (1920–1986)

Walter John Stoessel Jr.
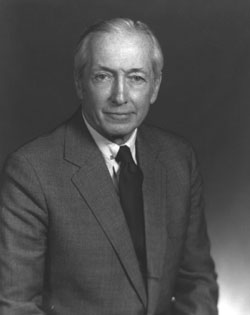

7th United States Deputy Secretary of State
- In office February 11, 1982 – September 22, 1982
- President: Ronald Reagan
- Preceded by: William P. Clark Jr.
- Succeeded by: Kenneth W. Dam

Acting United States Secretary of State
- In office July 5, 1982 – July 16, 1982
- President: Ronald Reagan
- Preceded by: Alexander Haig
- Succeeded by: George P. Shultz

United States Ambassador to West Germany
- In office October 27, 1976 – January 5, 1981
- Nominated by: Gerald Ford
- Preceded by: Martin J. Hillenbrand
- Succeeded by: Arthur F. Burns

United States Ambassador to the Soviet Union
- In office March 4, 1974 – September 13, 1976
- Nominated by: Gerald Ford
- Preceded by: Jacob D. Beam
- Succeeded by: Malcolm Toon

9th Assistant Secretary of State for European Affairs
- In office August 9, 1972 – January 7, 1974
- President: Richard Nixon
- Secretary: William P. Rogers; Henry Kissinger
- Preceded by: Martin J. Hillenbrand
- Succeeded by: Arthur A. Hartman

United States Ambassador to Poland
- In office September 12, 1968 – August 5, 1972
- Nominated by: Lyndon B. Johnson
- Preceded by: John A. Gronouski
- Succeeded by: Richard T. Davies

11th Under Secretary of State for Political Affairs
- In office February 28, 1981 – January 26, 1982
- Preceded by: David D. Newsom
- Succeeded by: Lawrence Eagleburger

Personal details
- Born: January 24, 1920 Manhattan, Kansas, U.S.
- Died: December 9, 1986 (aged 66) Washington, D.C., U.S.
- Education: Stanford University; Columbia University
- Profession: Diplomat

Walter John Stoessel Jr. (January 24, 1920 – December 9, 1986) was an American diplomat.

== Life and career ==
Born in Manhattan, Kansas, Stoessel was the son of Katherine (Haston) and Walter John Stoessel Sr. and graduated from Beverly Hills High School in California. He graduated from Stanford University in 1941 and later undertook graduate studies at Columbia University.

A career officer of the United States Foreign Service, Stoessel served as the U.S. ambassador to Poland from 1968 to 1972, U.S. Assistant Secretary of State for European and Canadian Affairs from 1972 to 1974, the U.S. ambassador to the Soviet Union between 1974 and 1976, and the ambassador to West Germany from 1976 through 1980. During his term as ambassador to Poland, Stoessel initiated contact with China and hosted talks on behalf of the United States, directly opening the door for President Richard Nixon's famous visit to China. In 1981, while ambassador to West Germany, he joined the delegation, with Walter Mondale, greeting the U.S. hostages released by Iran when they deplaned.

In 1982, President Ronald Reagan appointed Stoessel as the United States Deputy Secretary of State. During his term he served briefly as acting Secretary of State between the tenures of Alexander M. Haig and George P. Shultz.

He died in Washington, D.C., of leukemia and is buried at Arlington National Cemetery. The U.S. Department of State awards a Walter J. Stoessel Award for Distinguished Diplomatic Service in his honor.

Government offices
Preceded by Martin J. Hillenbrand	Assistant Secretary of State for European Affairs; 1972–1974	Succeeded by Arthur A. Hartman
Preceded by William P. Clark Jr.	United States Deputy Secretary of State; 1982	Succeeded by Kenneth W. Dam
Diplomatic posts
Preceded by William P. Clark Jr.	United States Ambassador to Poland; 1968–1972	Succeeded by Richard T. Davies
Preceded by Jacob D. Beam	United States Ambassador to the Soviet Union; 1974–1976	Succeeded by Malcolm Toon
Preceded by Martin J. Hillenbrand	United States Ambassador to West Germany; 1976–1981	Succeeded by Arthur F. Burns
Political offices
Preceded by David Newsom	Under Secretary of State for Political Affairs; 1981–1982	Succeeded by Lawrence Eagleburger
Preceded by Alexander Haig	Acting United States Secretary of State; 1982	Succeeded by George P. Shultz
