= Arthur A. Hartman =

American diplomat

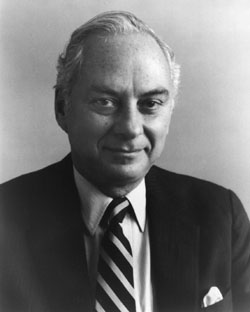

6th United States Ambassador to France
- In office July 7, 1977 – October 14, 1981
- President: Jimmy Carter; Ronald Reagan
- Preceded by: Kenneth Rush
- Succeeded by: Evan Griffith Galbraith

17th United States Ambassador to the Soviet Union
- In office September 28, 1981 – February 20, 1987
- President: Ronald Reagan
- Preceded by: Thomas J. Watson, Jr.
- Succeeded by: Jack F. Matlock, Jr.

10th Assistant Secretary of State for European Affairs
- In office January 8, 1974 – June 8, 1977
- Preceded by: Walter John Stoessel Jr.
- Succeeded by: George S. Vest

Personal details
- Born: Arthur Adair Hartman; March 12, 1926 New York City, New York, U.S.
- Died: March 16, 2015 (aged 89) Washington D.C., U.S.
- Profession: Diplomat

Arthur Adair Hartman (March 12, 1926 – March 16, 2015) was an American career diplomat who served as Ambassador to France under Jimmy Carter and Ambassador to the Soviet Union under Ronald Reagan.

== Career ==
Hartman served in the United States Army Air Corps from 1944 to 1946. He graduated from Harvard University in 1947 and attended Harvard Law School from 1947 to 1948. Rather than pursuing a degree, he took a job in the Marshall Plan administration in Europe, followed by work in the Foreign Service. Among his many postings with the State Department over the years were positions in Paris, Saigon, London and in Brussels as deputy chief of the U.S. Mission to the European Union. In 1974, Hartman was appointed Assistant Secretary of State for European and Canadian Affairs. From 1977 until 1981 he was the Ambassador to France and from 1981 until 1987 Ambassador to the Soviet Union.

Hartman was a member of the Council on Foreign Relations, the American Academy of Diplomacy, the French American Foundation and was on the Advisory Council of the Brookings Institution. He was also on the board of the Open Russia Foundation and Dreyfus Funds. He was awarded the French Légion d'honneur. In 2004, he was one of the 26 founders of Diplomats and Military Commanders for Change.

== Personal Life ==
Hartman was born in 1926 in Queens, New York. He was the son of Joel Hartman and May Hartman (nee Weinstein). He attended Flushing High School.

In 1949, he married Donna Van Dyke Ford, with whom he had four children.

Hartman died on March 16, 2015, in Washington, D.C., four days after his 89th birthday.

Government offices
Preceded by Walter John Stoessel, Jr.	Assistant Secretary of State for European Affairs; January 8, 1974 – June 8, 1977	Succeeded by George S. Vest
Diplomatic posts
Preceded by Kenneth Rush	United States Ambassador to France; 1977-1981	Succeeded by Evan G. Galbraith
Preceded by Thomas J. Watson, Jr.	United States Ambassador to the Soviet Union; 1981–1987	Succeeded by Jack F. Matlock, Jr.
