= J. Douglas Dykhouse =

American diplomat

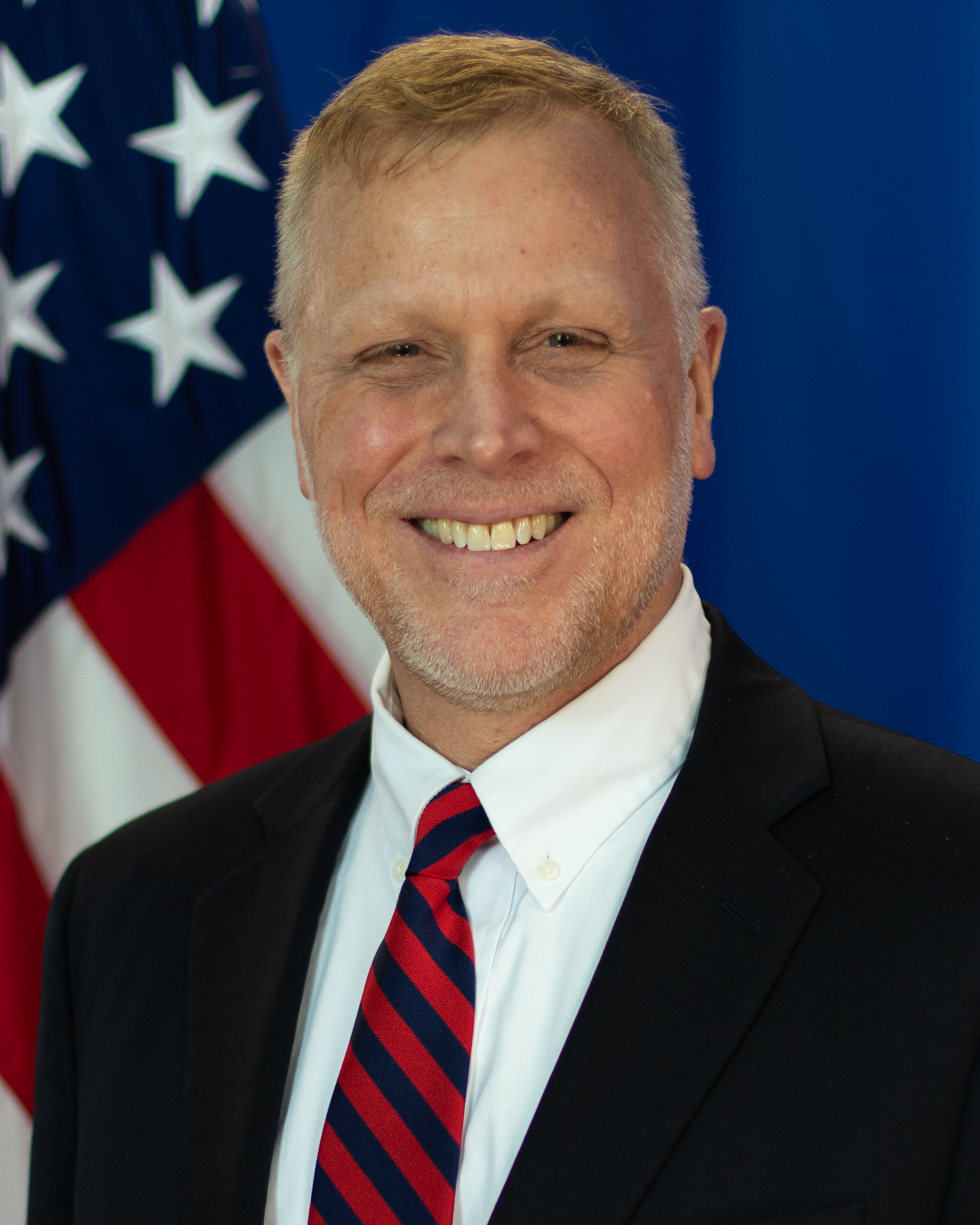
- Dykhouse in 2025
- Education: University of Michigan (BA, MA)
- Website: U.S. Embassy in Moscow

J. Douglas Dykhouse is the American diplomat who has served as the chargé d'affaires on an ad interim basis to Russia since 2025. He is the Deputy Chief of Mission at the U.S. Embassy in Moscow and has been the principal diplomatic officer since Lynne M. Tracy left the post on June 27, 2025. He was appointed deputy ambassador by Donald Trump in June 2025.
