= Aurora Prize for Awakening Humanity =

The Aurora Prize for Awakening Humanity
- Awarded for: Courage, commitment to a humanitarian cause and impact on the world
- Country: Armenia
- Presented by: Aurora Humanitarian Initiative
- First award: 2016
- No. of laureates: 7 laureates and 20 organizations as of 2022
- Website: aurorahumanitarian.org/en

The US $1,000,000 Aurora Prize for Awakening Humanity is an annual global humanitarian award recognizing individuals for humanitarian work. It is awarded on behalf of the survivors of the Armenian genocide.

The Aurora Prize ceremonies have taken place since April 24, 2016.

== History ==
The Aurora Humanitarian Initiative was founded by Noubar Afeyan, Vartan Gregorian (1934-2021), and Ruben Vardanyan. In the years that followed, Dr. Eric Esrailian and Lord Ara Darzi joined as Co-Founders, bringing transformative leadership to help guide the Initiative in its next decade of global impact. Together, they are committed to strengthening and expanding the Aurora humanitarian network.

The Aurora Prize for Awakening Humanity is one of the projects of the Aurora Humanitarian Initiative. It was officially announced at 100 LIVES launch event in New York on March 10, 2015. The creation of the Aurora Prize was inspired by many stories of the rescue of Armenians during the Armenian genocide.

The prize is named after Aurora Mardiganian, a survivor of the Armenian genocide and the author of the book Ravished Armenia.

The Aurora Humanitarian Index is an international opinion poll that measures attitudes about humanitarian issues and the impact of humanitarian intervention.

The inaugural 2016 Aurora Dialogues were held on April 23, 2016, in Matenadaran, Yerevan. Participants included Hina Jilani, Shirin Ebadi and Gareth Evans. 2017 Aurora Dialogues took place on May 27–28 in Armenia and on December 4–5 in Berlin, Germany. In 2018, Aurora Dialogues were held in New York (in March and September), Moscow, Yerevan and Berlin. 2019 Aurora Dialogues took place in Armenia on October 17–21, 2019, during the inaugural Aurora Forum. Due to the outbreak of COVID-19, the Aurora Dialogues were online in 2020. Some of the Aurora Dialogues events were online in 2021. The 2021 Aurora Dialogues event titled “Health Security: Humanitarian Impacts of the Covid-19 Pandemic” was held at the Ca' Zenobio degli Armeni in Venice.

== Aurora Prize ==
Nominations are solicited from humanitarian organizations and the public. The members of the Expert Panel assess all eligible nominations according to the Aurora Prize selection criteria to narrow the overall list to 20-25 nominees for the Selection Committee's attention. This panel is composed of humanitarian professionals and leaders of humanitarian organizations. The selection of finalists and the Aurora Prize laureate is made by the independent Aurora Prize Selection Committee.

=== 2016 Aurora Prize ===
Selection Committee Inaugural Selection Committee of the prize included the late Nobel Prize laureate Elie Wiesel, as well as Óscar Arias, Shirin Ebadi and Leymah Gbowee, former president of Ireland Mary Robinson, human rights activist Hina Jilani, former Australian foreign minister and president emeritus of the International Crisis Group Gareth Evans, president of the Carnegie Corporation of New York Vartan Gregorian and Academy Award-winning actor and humanitarian George Clooney.

Finalists

- Dr. Tom Catena
- Marguerite Barankitse
- Syeda Ghulam Fatima
- Father Bernard Kinvi

Ceremony The Aurora Prize for Awakening Humanity inaugural ceremony was held on April 24, 2016, in Yerevan at the Karen Demirchyan Sports and Concerts Complex.

The ceremony was hosted by an Armenian opera diva Hasmik Papian and American journalist and novelist David Ignatius. The ceremony was opened by an animated film directed by Eric Nazarian featuring Serj Tankian's"Aurora's Dream" as the soundtrack. Each of the finalists was introduced with a documentary mini-film directed by Andrei Loshak.

The live music during the ceremony was performed by State Youth Orchestra of Armenia conducted by Sergey Smbatyan. The fanfares of the ceremony was composed by Stepan Shakaryan. The statuette, created by Manvel Matevosyan was presented with an excerpt from Two Suns, a ballet by the Ballet2021 Foundation dance troupe (choreographer Rudolf Kharatyan), accompanied by Avet Terteryan's and Arno Babajanyan's music. The State Youth Orchestra of Armenia performed an excerpt from Aram Khachaturyan's Symphony No. 2 (Bell Symphony). The co-hostess, soprano Hasmik Papian performed Barsegh Kanachyan's "Lullaby". The ceremony was concluded with the song "Pour toi, Arménie" (For you, Armenia) performed by Gevorg Hakobyan and the State Youth Orchestra of Armenia.

Laureate The inaugural Aurora Prize was awarded to Marguerite Barankitse from Burundi.

Barankitse chose Fondation Jean-Francois Peterbroeck, Foundation du Grand-Duc et de la Grande-Duchesse, Bridderlech Deelen to receive $1 million awards as part of the prize package.

The statuette of the Aurora Prize for Awakening Humanity was created by Manvel Matevosyan and is called Towards Eternity.

=== 2017 Aurora Prize ===
Selection Committee The members of Selection Committee of 2017 Aurora Prize are George Clooney (co-chair), Vartan Gregorian, Oscar Arias, Shirin Ebadi, Gareth Evans, Leymah Gbowee, Hina Jilani, Mary Robinson and Ernesto Zedillo.

Finalists The nominations for 2017 Aurora Prize were opened on June 1 and the finalists were:

- Ms. Fartuun Adan and Ms. Ilwad Elman
- Ms. Jamila Afghani
- Dr. Tom Catena
- Mr. Muhammad Darwish
- Dr. Denis Mukwege

Laureate The 2017 Aurora Prize for Awakening Humanity was awarded to Dr. Tom Catena.

=== 2018 Aurora Prize ===
Selection Committee The members of Selection Committee of 2018 Aurora Prize are George Clooney (co-chair), Vartan Gregorian, Oscar Arias, Shirin Ebadi, Gareth Evans, Leymah Gbowee, Hina Jilani, Mary Robinson, Ernesto Zedillo, Lord Ara Darzi, Bernard Kouchner and Samantha Power.

Finalists

- Mr. Kyaw Hla Aung (1941-2021)
- Fr. Héctor Tomás González Castillo
- Mrs. Sunitha Krishnan

Laureate The 2018 Aurora Prize for Awakening Humanity was awarded to Mr. Kyaw Hla Aung.

=== 2019 Aurora Prize ===
Selection Committee

The members of Selection Committee of 2019 Aurora Prize are Oscar Arias, Shirin Ebadi, Leymah Gbowee, Mary Robinson, Hina Jilani, Gareth Evans, Ernesto Zedillo, Bernard Kouchner, Samantha Power, John Prendergast, Valery Gergiev, Vartan Gregorian, Lord Ara Darzi (chair), Benjamin Ferencz (honorary co-chair, 1920–2023) and George Clooney (honorary co-chair).

Finalists

- Mr. Mirza Dinnayi
- Mr. Zannah Mustapha
- Ms. Huda Al-Sarari

Laureate The 2019 Aurora Prize for Awakening Humanity was awarded to Mr. Mirza Dinnayi.

=== 2020 Aurora Prize ===
Selection Committee

The members of Selection Committee of 2020 Aurora Prize are Shirin Ebadi, Leymah Gbowee, Mary Robinson, Hina Jilani, Ernesto Zedillo, Bernard Kouchner, Samantha Power, Paul Polman, John Prendergast, Vartan Gregorian, Lord Ara Darzi (chair), Benjamin Ferencz (honorary co-chair, 1920–2023) and George Clooney (honorary co-chair).

Finalists

- Fartuun Adan and Ilwad Elman
- Angélique Namaika
- Sophie Beau and Klaus Vogel
- Sakena Yacoobi

Laureate The 2020 Aurora Prize for Awakening Humanity was awarded to Fartuun Adan and Ilwad Elman.

=== 2021 Aurora Prize ===
Selection Committee

The members of Selection Committee of 2020 Aurora Prize are Shirin Ebadi, Leymah Gbowee, Mary Robinson, Hina Jilani, Ernesto Zedillo, Bernard Kouchner, Dele Olojede, John Prendergast, Vartan Gregorian, Lord Ara Darzi (chair), Benjamin Ferencz (honorary co-chair, 1920–2023) and George Clooney (honorary co-chair).

Finalists

- Grégoire Ahongbonon
- Ruby Alba Castaño
- Paul Farmer
- Julienne Lusenge
- Ashwaq Moharram

Laureate

The sixth annual Aurora Prize for Awakening Humanity was awarded to Julienne Lusenge, a human rights defender, co-founder of Women's Solidarity for Inclusive Peace and Development (SOFEPADI) and Fund for Congolese Women (FFC), who has been helping the victims of wartime sexual violence for years.

=== 2022 Aurora Prize ===
Finalists

- Jamila Afghani
- Hadi Jumaan
- Mahienour El-Massry

Laureate

The seventh Aurora Prize for Awakening Humanity was awarded to Jamila Afghani, an educator, human rights defender, and founder of the Noor Educational and Capacity Development Organization (NECDO). Jamila has dedicated over 25 years of her life to giving the women of Afghanistan access to education.

=== 2024 Aurora Prize ===
Selection Committee

The 2024 Aurora Prize Selection Committee includes vice chair of Clinton Foundation and vice chair of Clinton Health Access Initiative Chelsea Clinton, Nobel laureate Leymah Gbowee; former president of Ireland Mary Robinson; president of Carnegie Corporation of New York Dame Louise Richardson; former president of Mexico Ernesto Zedillo; journalist and Pulitzer Prize winner Dele Olojede, former CEO of Unilever and co-founder and co-chair of IMAGINE Paul Polman, founder and CEO of Chobani and founder of the Tent Partnership for Refugees Hamdi Ulukaya, and human rights activist and co-founder of The Sentry John Prendergast. The committee is chaired by the co-director of the Institute of Global Health Innovation at Imperial College London, Lord Ara Darzi.

Finalists

- Abdulhadi Al-Khawaja
- Denis Mukwege
- Nasrin Sotoudeh

Laureate

The eighth Aurora Prize for Awakening Humanity was awarded to Dr. Denis Mukwege, a world-renowned gynecological surgeon and human rights activist from the Democratic Republic of the Congo (DRC). Dr. Mukwege is the president of Panzi Hospital and Foundation in the DRC, which he founded in 1999 to address the systemic issue of maternal healthcare and maternal mortality. Amidst ongoing conflict and critical healthcare needs stemming from war, the hospital has become one of the world’s preeminent treatment centers for survivors of sexual violence in conflict.

=== 2025 Aurora Prize ===
Finalists

- Sally Becker (UK)
- Jamal Eltaeb (Sudan)
- Zouhair Lahna (Morocco)
- Jill Seaman (USA/South Sudan)

Laureate

Dr. Jamal Eltaeb has been named the 2025 Aurora Prize Laureate. Amid Sudan’s devastating civil war and the near-total collapse of the country’s health system, Dr. Eltaeb has kept Al Nao Hospital in Omdurman operating as one of the last functioning referral hospitals in greater Khartoum—a testament to his resilience and leadership under fire.
