= The Diplomat (2015 film) =

- Film poster
- Directed by: David Holbrooke
- Produced by: Stacey Reiss
- Cinematography: Adam Vardy; Bao Nguyen; Jim Hurst; Richard Dallett
- Edited by: Seth Bomse
- Music by: Graham Reynolds
- Production companies: HBO Documentary Films; Giraffe Partners; Stacey Reiss Productions
- Distributed by: Home Box Office
- Release date: April 23, 2015 (Tribeca)
- Running time: 104 minutes
- Country: United States
- Language: English

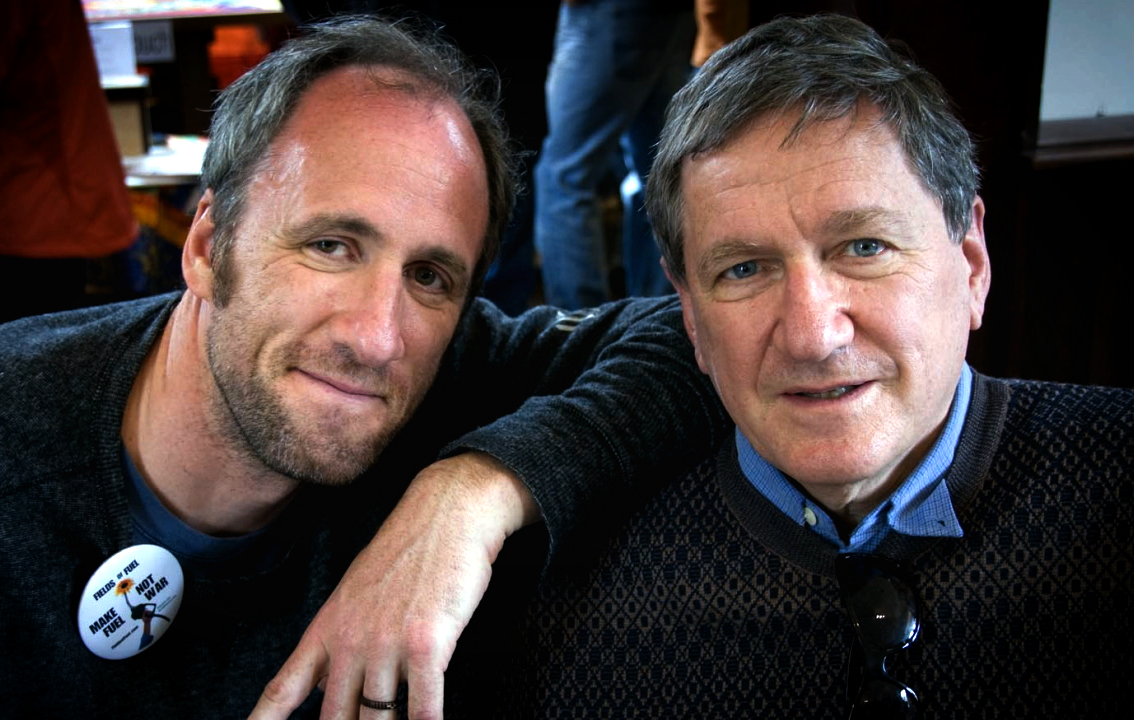
Director David Holbrooke (L) with his father, Ambassador Richard Holbrooke.

The Diplomat is a biographical documentary film released in 2015 about former U.S. Ambassador Richard Holbrooke, whose five-decade career began as a Foreign Service Officer in Vietnam during the war. At the time of his death in December 2010, he was the Obama administration's special representative for Afghanistan and Pakistan. The documentary's perspective is from Holbrooke's son, David, who directed the film.

== Release ==
The film had its U.S. premiere at the 2015 Tribeca Film Festival on April 23. Following the premiere, Director David Holbrooke and Producer Stacey Reiss participated in a Q&A session hosted by Katie Couric and featuring Roger Cohen and Ronan Farrow. In addition to Tribeca, the film played at additional festivals and was screened for audiences across the United States and Europe. Some notable screenings included AFI Docs, San Francisco International Film Festival, Traverse City Film Festival, Sarajevo Film Festival, Jerusalem Film Festival, and Telluride Mountainfilm.

The documentary aired nationally on HBO on November 2, 2015, in conjunction with the 20th anniversary of the Dayton Agreement which ended the Bosnian War.

== Cast ==
The film features interviews from "journalists and policy makers and military leaders" such as Madeleine Albright, Wesley Clark, Bill Clinton, Hillary Clinton, Tom Donilon, Al Gore, Christopher R. Hill, John Kerry, Henry Kissinger, Ashraf Ghani, Doug Lute, David Petraeus, Samantha Power, Strobe Talbott, Dan Feldman, Barnett Rubin, Vali Nasr, and Rina Amiri. Additionally, interviews from journalists who covered Holbrooke's career are included: Christiane Amanpour, Roger Cohen, Ronan Farrow, Dexter Filkins, Joe Klein, Stanley Karnow, George Packer, David Rohde, Diane Sawyer, and Bob Woodward. Also featured in the film is Anthony Holbrooke, Andrew Holbrooke, Litty Holbrooke, Les Gelb, Jim Johnson, Kati Marton, Frank Wisner, Kofi Annan, Mate Granic, Bakir Izetbegovic, Nancy Dupree, and Vladimir Lehovich.

== Production ==
The film attempts to trace the diplomatic career of Holbrooke by visiting the places that shaped his career in government. Location shoots include Vietnam, Bosnia and Herzegovina, Kosovo, Croatia, and Afghanistan.

The film was directed by David Holbrooke. His last film, Hard as Nails, aired on HBO in December 2007. Other documentaries include Freaks Like Me, Time for a New God and A Redwood Grows in Brooklyn. All are part of an ongoing series he created called "Original Thinkers."

== Critical response ==
Gordon Goldstein began his op-ed for Politico by stating the film "manages to be not just a poignant and surprisingly dispassionate portrait of his late father, the brilliant but divisive Richard Holbrooke, but also to illuminate the continuum of past and present U.S. foreign policy. In so doing it delivers important lessons on what we must do now to resolve our most complex and intractable problems abroad."

Brendan Vaughan from GQ said "the film is...a fascinating, ringside history of post-Cold War America, told through the prism of this one Zelig-like figure, and a moving father-son story that will leave any man who watches it reflecting on his own relationships. You don't have to be Richard Holbrooke, or even close, to hope that your children will be as understanding as David Holbrooke is about all the things you missed when you were still at the office."

Regina Weinreich from The Huffington Post wrote in her online review that "watching HBO's documentary, The Diplomat, offers a generous glimpse into Washington circles, and an important era in American history."

Neil Genzlinger from The New York Times offered that "the film is at its best when detailing Mr. Holbrooke’s work untangling the nightmare in the Balkans for President Bill Clinton and contending with the Serbian president, Slobodan Milošević. The 1995 Dayton peace agreement, which ended the war in Bosnia, is regarded as perhaps his finest achievement."

Dave Wiegand from the San Francisco Chronicle, commented that "as a director, David Holbrooke becomes the avatar for the film’s audience, sharing the driving desire to understand what made Richard Holbrooke great, often singularly effective and almost always the smartest guy in the room."

Chris Nashawaty gave the film an "A−" in his Entertainment Weekly review, saying the doc "balances poignant political insight with a heartfelt narrative about a man trying to reckon with his absent father’s legacy."

Robert Abele from the Los Angeles Times said "the portrait that emerges, with David on camera as a respectful but quizzical son as he pores through letters, photos, journals and audio recordings, is of a hard-driving, ambitious figure who preferred to mingle in the world and reflect reality in his diplomatic efforts rather than become trapped in a government-obfuscating bubble."

Manuel Roig-Franzia from The Washington Post observed that "the film doesn’t attempt to be a definitive account of Holbrooke, the relentless diplomatic figure who brokered peace in the Balkans, but it straddles the personal and the professional in a way that only a son’s film about his father could."

Norman Boucher writing for the Brown University Alumni Magazine said the film "displays rich depth as a conventional documentary. As Richard Holbrooke’s son, David Holbrooke earned the trust not only of an all-star group but of Holbrooke’s former aides and adversaries. The film’s ambition doesn’t stop there, however. Interwoven with the ambassadorial profile is a more intimate look at the man and his shortcomings as father and husband. At the beginning of The Diplomat, David Holbrooke makes the startling claim that only after Richard Holbrooke’s death did he realize his father was a historical figure."
