= Rina Amiri =

American diplomat and activist

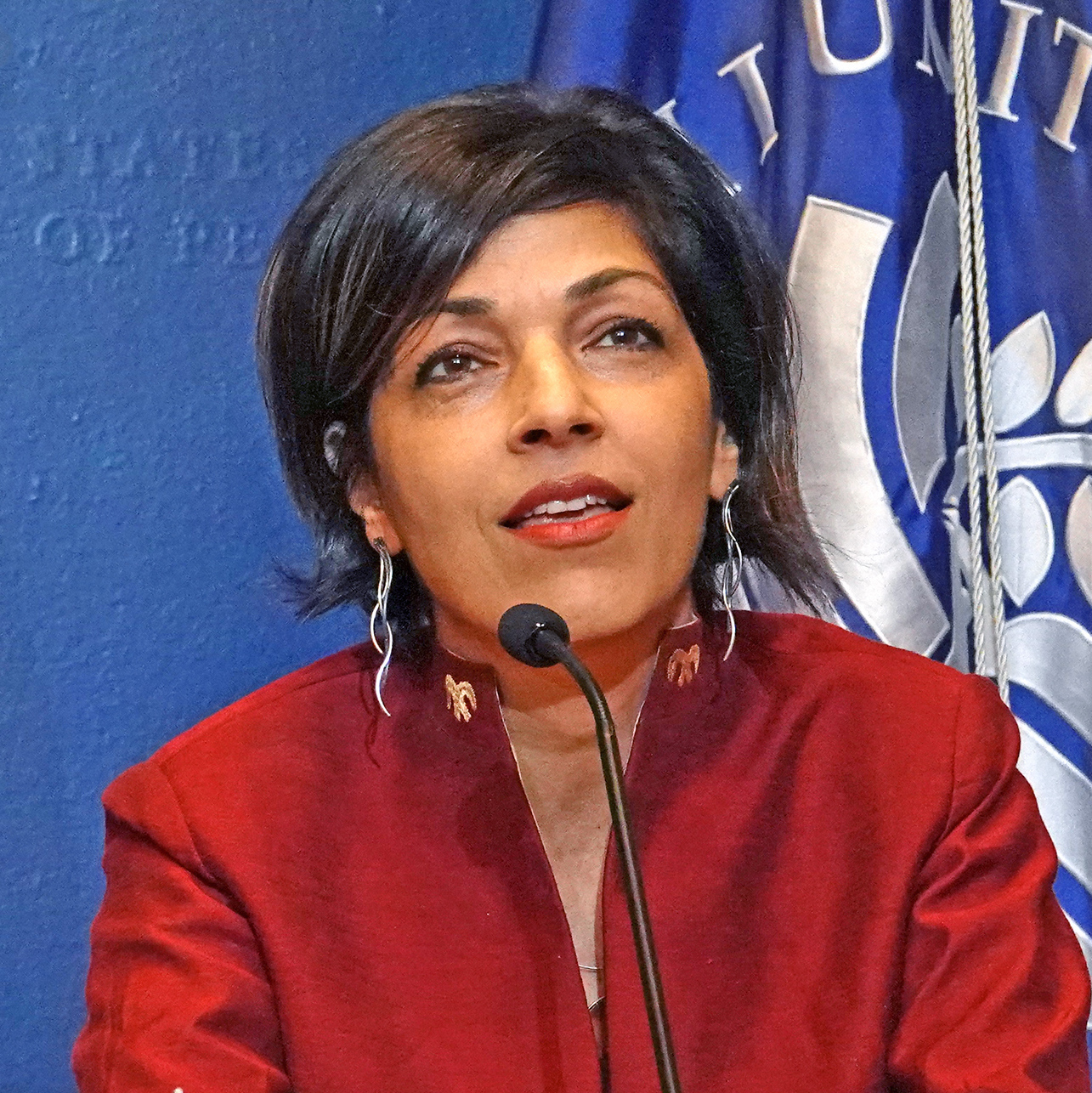
- Amiri in 2022

U.S. Special Envoy for Afghan Women, Girls and Human Rights
- In office January 6, 2022 – January 20, 2025
- President: Joe Biden

Personal details
- Born: 1969 (age 56–57) Kingdom of Afghanistan
- Citizenship: United States
- Education: Tufts University

Rina Amiri (born c. 1969) is an Afghan-born American diplomat and activist who served as the U.S. special envoy for Afghan women, girls and human rights from 2022 to 2025. She served as senior advisor to the U.S. special representative for Afghanistan and Pakistan under the Obama administration, has served in the United Nations in several peace building capacities, and has held senior positions in programs at Harvard, Princeton, and New York University. She has provided political analysis and commentary on MSNBC, PBS, CNN, and CSPAN, and was recognized as 125 Women of Impact by Newsweek.

== Early life and education ==
Amiri was born c. 1969 in Afghanistan. In 1973, at four years old, she became a refugee when her parents left secretly through the Khyber Pass out of Afghanistan and into Pakistan. They later moved to Mumbai before settling in California.

In 2007, Amiri completed a masters of arts in law and diplomacy, mediation, and international relations at the Fletcher School of Law and Diplomacy of Tufts University.

== Career ==
In 2002 when United States Senator John Kerry spoke at a forum at the Fletcher School of Law and Diplomacy at Tufts University after the September 11 attacks in 2001 and opened the floor to questions, she said "the color of our hair and our skin does not reflect what is in our hearts and minds... The Afghan population is not the Taliban. They have been the first victims of the Taliban."

She subsequently became a speaker on Afghanistan who appeared repeatedly in national media.

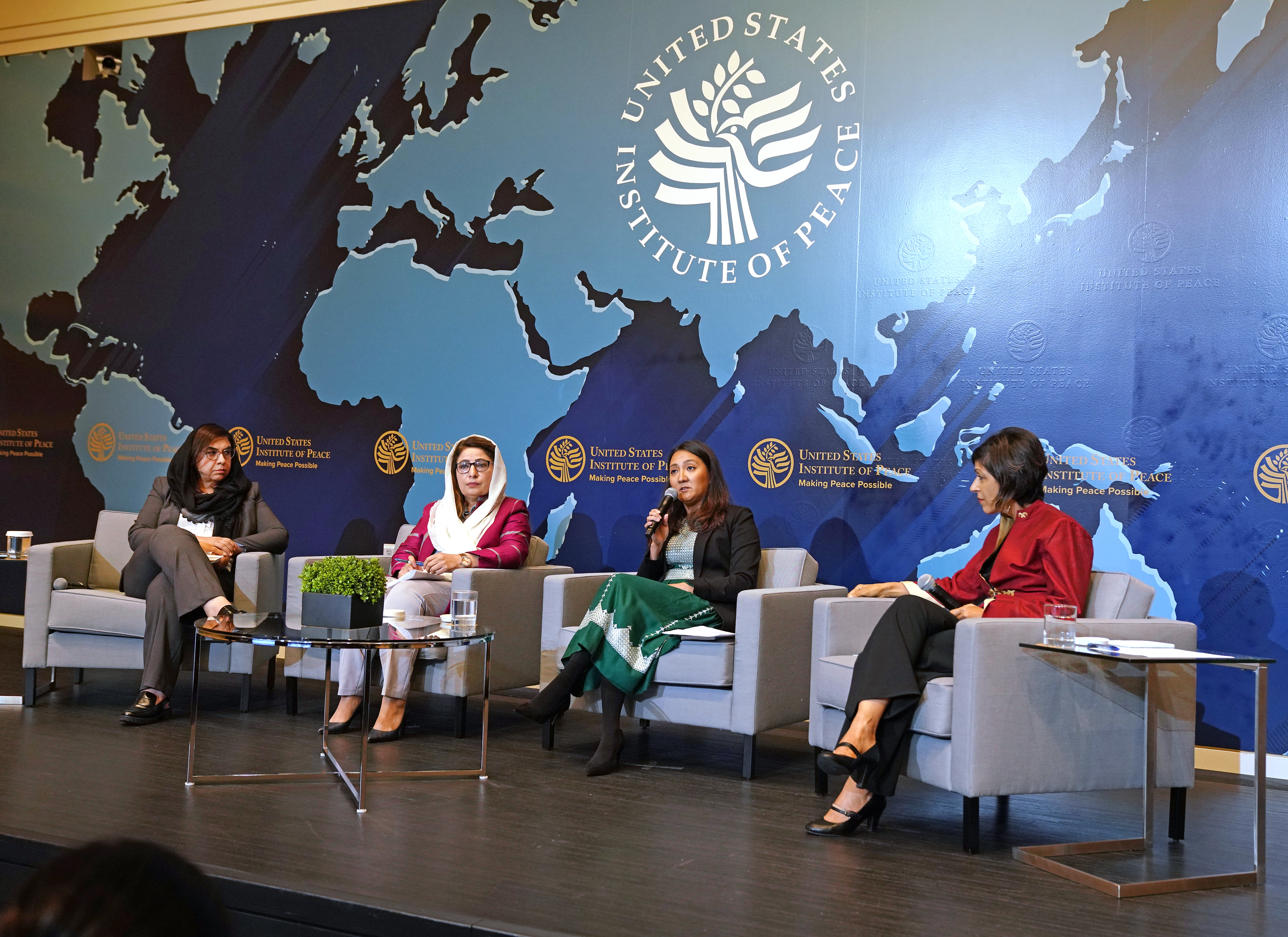
Discussion about "Engaging Afghan Women and Civil Society in U.S. Policymaking" in 2022. Left to right: Palwasha Hassan, Asila Wardak, Naheed Sarabi and Amiri.

Amiri was an advisor to Richard Holbrooke, who served as a special advisor to President Barack Obama on Afghanistan and Pakistan. In 2015, she appeared in the documentary film The Diplomat about the life of Holbrooke, filmed after his death.

On December 29, 2021, U.S. Secretary of State Antony Blinken announced her appointment as special envoy for Afghan women, girls, and human rights. Rina Amiri - United States Department of StateShe took office on January 6, 2022. The appointment came as women in the country were facing increased oppression by the ruling Taliban. She has also worked to raise international awareness of the plight of Afghan refugees who have been "stranded everywhere" and face years of uncertainty.
