= Saint-Camille (disambiguation) =

Saint-Camille may refer to one of two places in Canada:

- Saint-Camille, a township in Quebec
- Saint-Camille-de-Lellis, Quebec, a parish in Quebec

or a place in Burkina Faso:

- Saint-Camille, Burkina Faso in Doumbala Department

== See also ==
- Saint Camille Association
