= Henry E. Catto Jr. =

American diplomat

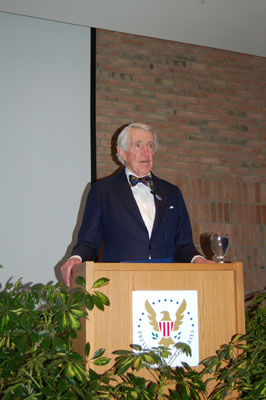
- Catto in 2006

United States Ambassador to the United Kingdom
- In office May 17, 1989 – March 13, 1991
- President: George H. W. Bush
- Preceded by: Charles H. Price II
- Succeeded by: Raymond G. H. Seitz

Assistant Secretary of Defense for Public Affairs
- In office May 22, 1981 – September 16, 1983
- President: Ronald Reagan
- Preceded by: Thomas B. Ross
- Succeeded by: Michael I. Burch

Ambassador to the United Nations Office at Geneva
- In office July 1, 1976 – April 4, 1977
- President: Gerald Ford; Jimmy Carter
- Preceded by: Francis L. Dale
- Succeeded by: William vanden Heuvel

17th Chief of Protocol of the United States
- In office April 3, 1974 – July 1, 1976
- President: Richard Nixon; Gerald Ford
- Preceded by: Marion H. Smoak
- Succeeded by: Shirley Temple Black

United States Ambassador to El Salvador
- In office October 21, 1971 – September 2, 1973
- President: Richard Nixon
- Preceded by: William G. Bowdler
- Succeeded by: James F. Campbell

Personal details
- Born: December 6, 1930 Dallas, Texas, U.S.
- Died: December 18, 2011 (aged 81) San Antonio, Texas, U.S.
- Profession: Diplomat

Henry Edward Catto Jr. (December 6, 1930 – December 18, 2011) was an American businessman and public servant.

A native of San Antonio, Texas, and son of a prominent insurance man, he was educated at T.M.I.—The Episcopal School of Texas, graduating in 1948, and at Williams College, graduating in 1952. In the early 1960s, Catto twice ran for the Texas Legislature as a Republican, losing both times. In his 1960 attempt, he lost to notorious San Antonio gambler V. E. "Red" Berry.

Catto held several positions within the United States government. He was Deputy Representative to the Organization of American States from 1969 to 1971, Ambassador to El Salvador from 1971 to 1973, Chief of Protocol of the United States from 1974 to 1976, Ambassador to the United Nations Office at Geneva from 1976 to 1977, and Assistant Secretary of Defense for Public Affairs from 1981 to 1983. In 1989, President George H. W. Bush appointed him as United States Ambassador to the United Kingdom. He held the position until 1991, when he became the director of the United States Information Agency.

From 1955 to 2000, he was a partner in the insurance brokerage firm Catto & Catto in San Antonio. From 1983 to 1989, he was vice chairman and president of a broadcast group at H&C Communications. In 1999, he was elected chairman of the Atlantic Council of the United States, and in 2007, its chairman emeritus. He was a contributing editor of the American Journalism Review. At the time of his death, he was vice chairman of the Aspen Institute, where he and his wife, Jessica Hobby Catto, had established the Catto Fellowship for a Sustainable Future. He and his wife also supported the Aspen Center for Environmental Studies.

Catto was a member of the board of the National Public Radio Foundation, having served on the NPR Board from 1995 to 2001. He was also a member of the Smithsonian National Board, and a member of the Council on Foreign Relations and the Advisory Council of America Abroad Media. He was Diplomat-in-Residence at the University of Texas at San Antonio, held honorary LLD degrees from the University of Aberdeen in Scotland and St. Mary's University in San Antonio, and was a member of the Honourable Society of the Middle Temple in London. He authored Ambassadors at Sea: The High and Low Adventures of a Diplomat (University of Texas Press, 1998).

Ambassador Catto was married to the late Jessica Hobby, daughter of William P. Hobby and Oveta Culp Hobby. Jessica Hobby Catto was a noted conservationist and journalist who wrote a blog for the Huffington Post on conservation, the media, and political issues until her death in 2009. Together the Cattos had four children. Henry Catto died at his home in San Antonio on December 18, 2011.

Diplomatic posts
Preceded by William G. Bowdler	U.S. Ambassador to El Salvador; October 21, 1971 – September 2, 1973	Succeeded by James F. Campbell
Preceded by Charles H. Price II	U.S. Ambassador to the United Kingdom; April 14, 1989 – March 13, 1991	Succeeded by Raymond G. H. Seitz
