= Ashwaq Moharram =

Yemeni physician and activist

Ashwaq Moharram (Arabic: أشواق محرم; born 1974 or 1975 (age 50–51)) is a Yemeni physician and activist, noted for her work dealing with starvation in the Yemeni city of Al Hudaydah.

Yemen

== Life ==
Moharram is married with 2 children. By late 2016, she lived alone in the Houthi-controlled city of Al Hudaydah,

Moharram trained as a gynecologist. She has done humanitarian work in Yemen since the early 2000s.

Moharram has said of her work: "I'm seeing the same thing I used to watch on TV when the famine unfolded in Somalia. I never thought I would see this in Yemen." Moharram has worked for numerous international aid organisations, but since 2015 has worked independently, delivering medicine and food in her car, serving as a mobile clinic. She has also organized the distribution of food and milk to children in need.

Moharram has spoken to news media about the need for humanitarian aid in Yemen.

== Awards and recognition ==
In 2016, after working as a doctor for twenty years, she was named one of the BBC 100 Women for her achievements.

In 2021, she was a finalist for the 2021 Aurora Humanitarian prize.
