= Manfred Cierpka =

Manfred Cierpka (13 April 1950, Nürtingen - 14 December 2017, Heidelberg) was a German psychiatrist, psychoanalyst and family therapist.

== Life ==
After studying medicine at the University of Ulm, he received his doctorate in 1977 with a dissertation on Personalpronomina als Indikatoren für interpersonale Beziehungen in einer psychoanalytischen Gruppentherapie ('Personal pronouns as indicators of interpersonal relationships in psychoanalytic group therapy'). This was followed by specialist training and his habilitation – the topic of which was: Zur Diagnostik von Familien mit einem schizophrenen Jugendlichen ('On the diagnosis of families with a schizophrenic adolescent').

From 1991 to 1998, he was Professor of Psychosomatic Medicine and Family Therapy at the University of Göttingen. From 1998, he was medical director of the Institute for Psychosomatic Cooperation Research and Family Therapy at the Center for Psychosocial Medicine of Heidelberg University Hospital. This institute houses Germany's only professorship for family therapy at a university hospital. He retired in 2015.

From 2009 to 2013, he was chairman of the Scientific Advisory Board for Psychotherapy . From 1990, Cierpka was, alongside Verena Kast (2001–2020) and Peter Henningsen (since 2011), scientific director of the Lindau Psychotherapy Weeks.

In 2017, Manfred Cierpka was awarded the Federal Cross of Merit, First Class.

Cierpka founded the (Göttingen Working Group for Interdisciplinary Research on Violence) with Klaus Vogel.

Manfred Cierpka was married to child and adolescent psychotherapist Astrid Brüß from 1972 until his death. The couple had two sons. He died of cancer at the age of 67.

== Fields of work ==
Cierpka's areas of work were psychotherapy and prevention research. Projects include the parenting school "Das Baby verstehen" ("Understanding the Baby"), "Keiner fällt durchs Netz" ("No One Falls Through the Net") and "Die Kieselschule" ("The Pebble School") – a musical curriculum to promote social-emotional skills in children.

He adapted the American program "Second Step" to set up Faustlos, a violence prevention program designed to promote children's socio-emotional skills. The goal of Faustlos is to prevent aggressive behavior by strengthening children's conflict resolution skills. Children with strong conflict resolution abilities are less likely to resort to violence in heated arguments because they do not need to stabilize their self-esteem at the expense of others. The Alliance for Children and Against Violence helps to achieve this goal. The German-language version of the program was developed in 1996/1997 under the direction of Manfred Cierpka and has been evaluated in several empirical studies. The program is used in kindergartens, primary schools, and, since 2011, in secondary schools. The curriculum teaches age-appropriate skills in the areas of empathy, impulse control, and managing anger and frustration. Faustlos is an integral part of the educational work in over 7,000 daycare centers and primary schools in Germany, Austria, Luxembourg, and Switzerland.

== Contribution to scientific journals ==
- Member of the advisory board of the journal Psychotherapy Research since 1991
- Editor of the journal Psychotherapeut from 1994 onwards
- From 1995 Scientific Advisory Board of the journal Group Dynamics and Group Therapy
- From 2007 onwards, member of the Scientific Advisory Board of the journal Trauma and Violence
- Editor-in-Chief of the journal Mental Health and Prevention from 2012

== Writings (selection) ==
=== As author ===
- With Ute Hennige, Ulambayar Badarch, Andreas Eickhorst: Healthy – Protected – Secure. Early Support for Families – A Project for Psychosocial Prevention for Young Parents in Difficult Circumstances in Ulaanbaatar/Mongolia (2013–2017). Heidelberg 2017.
- Nonviolent Conflict Resolution: How Children Learn to Resolve Conflicts Nonviolently. Herder, Freiburg im Breisgau 2005; 8th edition 2011.
- with Angelika Gregor: Understanding the Baby. The handbook for the parenting course for midwives. Karl-Kübel-Foundation for Child and Family, Bensheim 2005.

=== As editor ===
- Lindau Texts 1991–2000. Proceedings of the Lindau Psychotherapy Weeks 1990–1999; Springer, Heidelberg 1991–2000
- Handbook of Family Diagnostics. Springer, Berlin 1996; 3rd, updated and expanded edition: Springer, Heidelberg 2008.
- Possibilities for violence prevention. Vandenhoeck & Ruprecht, Göttingen 2005.
- Early Childhood 0–3 Years. Counseling and Psychotherapy for Parents with Infants and Toddlers. Springer, Berlin 2012; 2nd edition 2014.
