= Mirza Dinnayi =

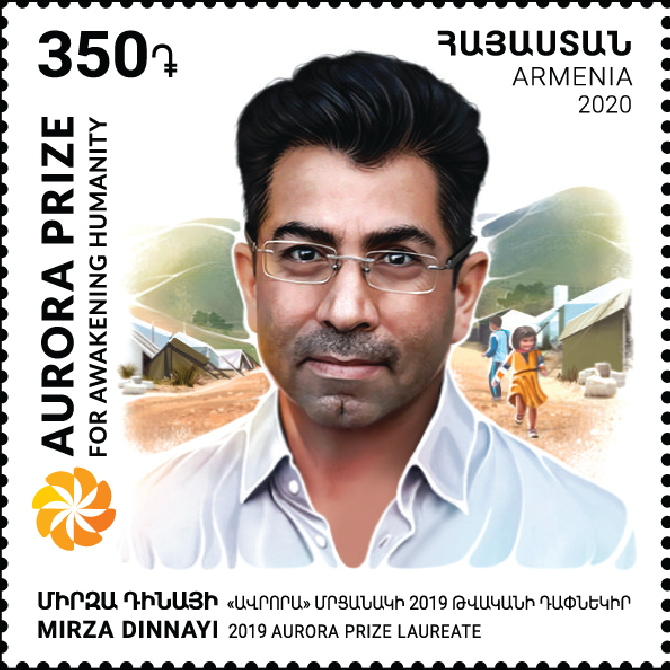
- Mirza Dinnayi on a 2020 stamp of Armenia
- Born: ميرزا حسن دنايي; 1973 (age 52–53); Sinjar, Iraq
- Occupations: Writer, Social Activist
- Known for: Air Bridge Iraq

Mirza Hassan Dinnayi (Arabic: ميرزا حسن دنايي; born 1973) is an Iraqi writer and Yazidi social activist, and a 2019 Aurora Humanitarian Award laureate.

Mirza Dinnayi is known as the director and co-founder of the Luftbrücke Irak, an organization which helps Yazidi victims of the Iraq war, rescues women and children from the ISIS-controlled territories and transfers them to Germany, where they receive medical care.

== Biography ==
Mirza Dinnayi was born in Sinjar, Iraq. His father Hasan Ali Aga was the chief of the Yazidi Dinnayi tribe. Since school Mirza started writing on Yazidi troubled state in Iraq. Later, as a student of the Medical faculty, he joined students’ opposition to Saddam Hussein and his statecraft. In 1992 he had to flee to Iraqi Kurdistan.

During the Iraqi Kurdish Civil War Mirza Dinnayi applied for political asylum in Germany. Soon, he became a prominent member of the Yazidi expatriate community. After the 2003 USA invasion of Iraq and Hussein’s fall, Dinnayi was offered a post of the presidential adviser for minority rights to Jalal Talabani. Mirza worked in this position for almost a year.

On August 14, 2007, two suicide bombers set off car bombs in two Yazidi towns near Mosul. Mirza Dinnayi initiated the fundraising company for the victims and asked his friends from Neue Osnabrücker Zeitung newspaper to print the call for help. Two German hospitals acceded, offering free of charge medical help to the injured children. The main issue was their transfer to Germany as the children were coming from poor families and had no documents. After the first mission, Dinnayi realized there were no charity organizations that worked with the Iraqi. This idea inspired him to establish Air Bridge Iraq (German: Luftbrücke Irak). Its name was taken after German: Berliner Luftbrücke, a West Berlin rescue mission in the World War II. In 2007–2014 Luftbrücke Irak helped 150 children and women to find asylum and get medical help in Germany.

In early August 2014, ISIS militants occupied Sinjar. The Yazidis escaped to the Sinjar Mountains. Mirza Dinnayi was one of the persons, who persuaded the Iraq prime minister to evacuate the civilians by helicopters. Dinnayi himself guided the pilots, who didn't know the local terrain. On the 12th of August, 2014, the Mi-7 helicopter with Dinnayi on board crashed in a few minutes after the ascent. With the broken leg and ribs, Mirza Dinnayi survived and was transported to Germany. Shortly afterward, in a wheelchair he returned to Iraq – to visit the rescue camp in Khanke, Kurdistan Region where displaced Yazidi refugees who fled from Sinjar region were staying.

In the rescue camp Dinnayi found out that the Yazidi women, saved from sexual slavery in ISIS, suffered from double psychological trauma – apart from the abuse itself, they experienced severe condemnation from the conservative Yazidi society. Mirza Dinnayi arranged the evacuation to Germany, where the specialist helped the victims to deal with severe depressions, anxiety attacks, self-imposed isolation, insomnia, and suicidal ideations. More than a thousand women and children were transferred to Germany, including future social rights activist and the Sakharov Prize winner Lamiya Haji Bashar and Nobel Prize Laureate Nadia Murad.

== Awards ==
In April 2016 Winfried Kretschmann, the prime minister of Baden-Württemberg, awarded Mirza Dinnayi with golden Staufer Medal for Humanitarian Service.

In October 2019 Dinnayi received the Aurora Award for Awakening Humanity. As the laureate, he could choose 3 organizations to share the $1 mln prize. Dinnayi picked Air Bridge Iraq, SEED Foundation and the Shai Fund.
