= Bernard Kinvi =

Central African priest

Father Bernard Kinvi
- Born: 1982 or 1983 (age 42–43); Togo
- Occupations: Catholic priest, missionary
- Known for: Protecting 1500+ Muslims during the Central African Republic conflict

Bernard Kinvi is a Togolese Catholic priest and a member of the Order of Saint Camillus. He is known for his humanitarian work during the conflict in the Central African Republic, particularly as the head of a Catholic mission in Bossemptélé. He was awarded the Alison Des Forges Award for Extraordinary Activism by Human Rights Watch for protecting more than 1,500 Muslim refugees in his church and hospital compound in 2014.

== Early life and education ==
Kinvi was born in Togo and experienced a difficult childhood marked by political instability and personal loss. He entered the seminary at a young age and later joined the Order of Saint Camillus, a Roman Catholic religious order dedicated to the care of the sick and vulnerable.

== Mission in the Central African Republic ==
In 2010, Kinvi was sent as a missionary to the Central African Republic, where he became head of a Catholic mission in Bossemptélé. The mission included a parish, a school, and a hospital, where he also served as administrator.

During the 2013–2014 conflict, violence between predominantly Muslim Seleka rebels and largely Christian Anti-balaka militias led to widespread attacks on civilians. Kinvi became known for providing shelter, medical care, and protection to Muslim civilians who were being targeted.

At the height of the violence in 2014, he sheltered more than 1,500 Muslim refugees within the mission compound. Despite threats from armed groups, he refused to hand over those under his protection. He also organized and personally accompanied evacuations of refugees to safer areas, including transport convoys to neighboring Cameroon. In addition to civilians, he treated wounded individuals from all sides of the conflict, emphasizing neutrality and the equal dignity of all human life.

== Humanitarian work ==
Kinvi's work is rooted in the charism of the Camillians, which emphasizes care for the sick even at great personal risk. He has advocated for impartial humanitarian assistance regardless of religion or ethnicity and has been involved in efforts to rebuild healthcare and community trust in post-conflict areas.

== Recognition ==
Kinvi has received international recognition for his actions during the conflict, including:

- Alison Des Forges Award for Extraordinary Activism (2014), presented by Human Rights Watch
- Finalist, Aurora Prize for Awakening Humanity (2016)

== Later life ==
After several years of service in the Central African Republic, Kinvi continued his involvement in humanitarian and healthcare initiatives and remained active in missionary and charitable work.

== Legacy ==
Kinvi is regarded as a symbol of humanitarian courage and religious commitment. His actions during the conflict in the Central African Republic have been highlighted in discussions of peacebuilding, interreligious cooperation, and the protection of civilians in war zones.
