= Manizha Wafeq =

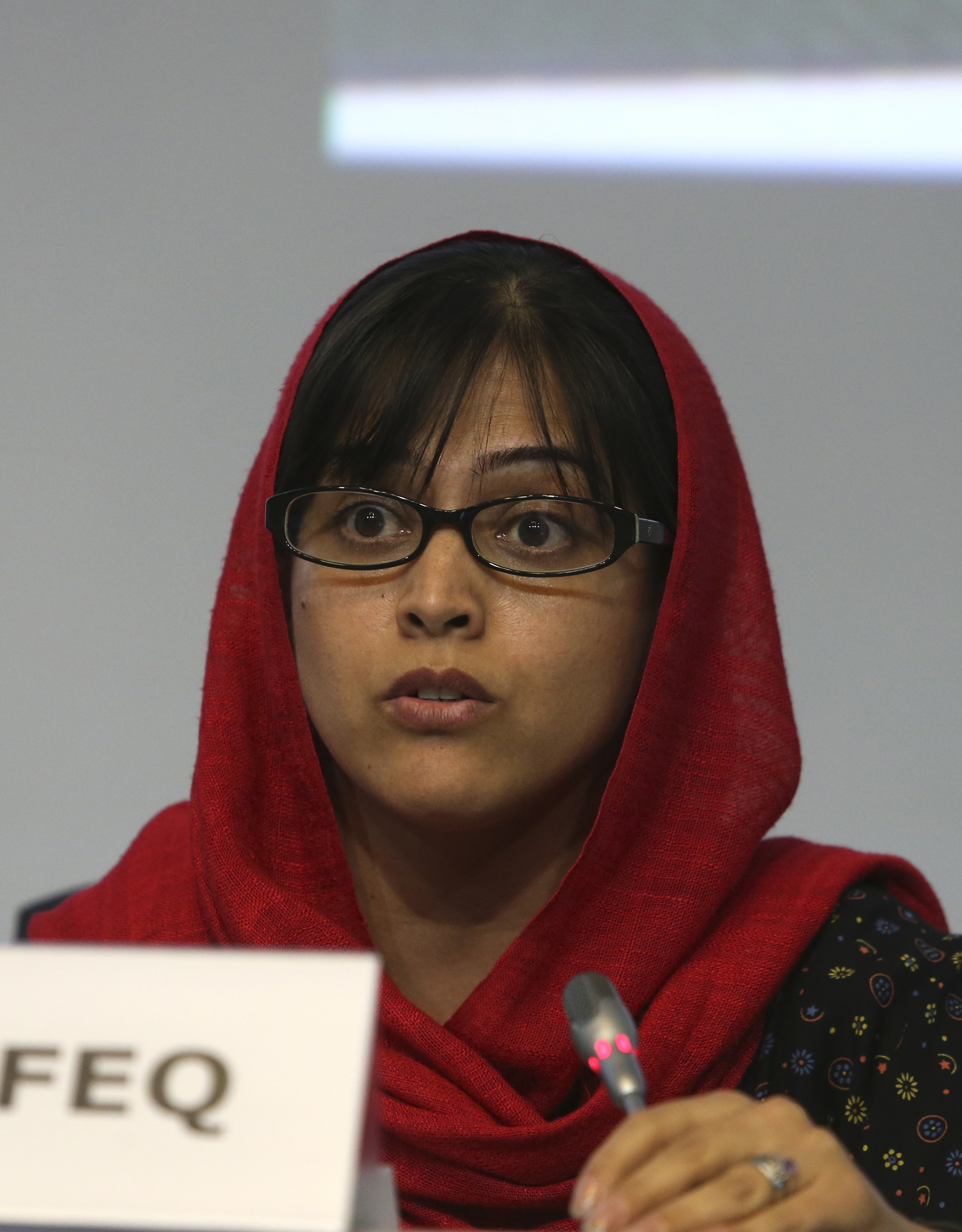
- Manizha Wafeq in 2016
- Education: degree in Economics
- Occupations: entrepreneur, campaigner

Manizha Wafeq is an Afghan entrepreneur and campaigner for women's rights.

== Career ==
With a degree in Economics, she has been working since 2002 with development projects for women's empowerment and gender equality. She has co-authored a Gender and the Legal Framework of Afghanistan training manual and training manual for Start-up Businesses. She has trained more than 500 government staff in Kabul and provinces on Gender Mainstreaming. She has worked 10 years with the Program "Peace Through Business"” a program of the Institute for Economic Empowerment of Women (IEEW) and has trained more than 250 business women from Kabul and provinces.

Wafeq worked as one of four women partners in a consulting firm in 2008 in Kabul. Later, Wafeq and her sister, Sania Wafeq established a clothing production company in 2012 called “Wonderland Women” which sells both ready-made and custom clothing. Though she has a busy schedule, her commitment for women's empowerment and gender equality encouraged her to serve as an executive board member for Afghan Women's Network (AWN) for two years and be one of the founders for Leading Entrepreneurs for Afghanistan Development (LEAD) to do advocacy for women's economic rights and role in Afghanistan.
