= Asila Wardak =

Afghan activist

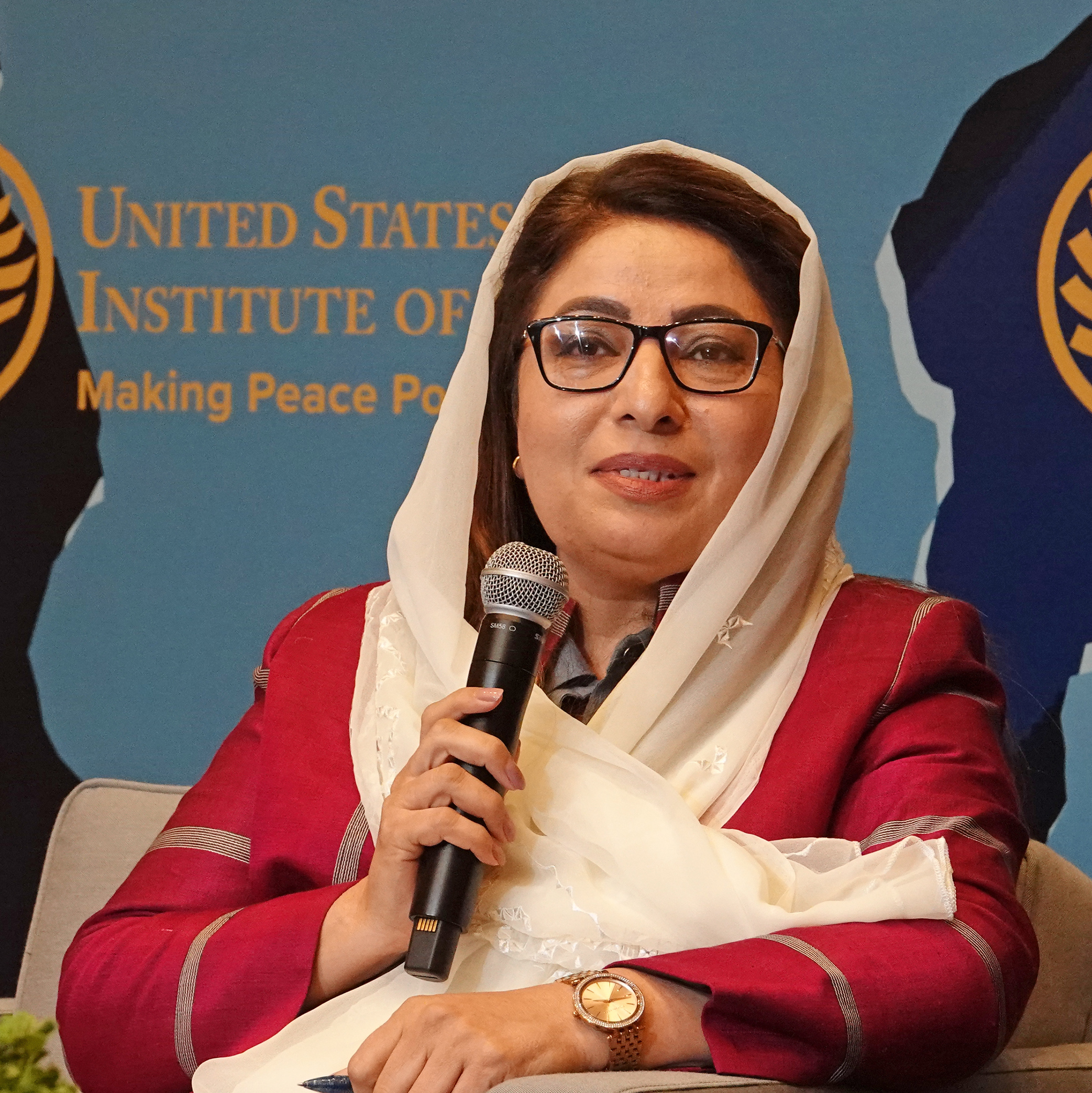
- Occupation: Diplomat
- Employer: Harvard Radcliffe Institute

Asila Wardak is an Afghan human rights activist, women's activist, former diplomat, and the first Afghan woman elected as a member of the Organization of the Islamic Cooperation (OIC) Independent Human Rights Commission. Wardak is one of the co-founders of the Afghan Women's Network. She served as Minister Counselor at the Afghanistan Mission to the United Nations. She also worked as the head of the human rights issue for Afghanistan's Ministry of Foreign Affairs.

On 7 July 2019 Wardak attended the Intra Afghan Dialogue talks in Doha as a member of the Afghanistan High Peace Council. Wardak also received violent threats in 2019 due to her activism.

In 2020, Wardak was an Advisory Board Member for Mina's List, an organization dedicated to women's political participation and equality.

Wardak is a 2022-2023 Harvard Radcliffe Institute fellow and a Robert G. James Scholar Fellow focusing on Policy & Practice. On 28 July 2022 Wardak appeared alongside U.S. Secretary of State Antony J. Blinken, Rina Amiri, U.S. Institute of Peace President Lisa Grande, Palwasha Hassan, Brookings Institution fellow Naheed Sarabi for the event "Engaging Afghan Women & Civil Society in U.S. Policymaking: The Launch of the U.S.-Afghan Consultative Mechanism" which marked the launch of the U.S.- Afghan Consultative Mechanism (USACM).
