= Thomas M. T. Niles =

American diplomat (1939–2025)

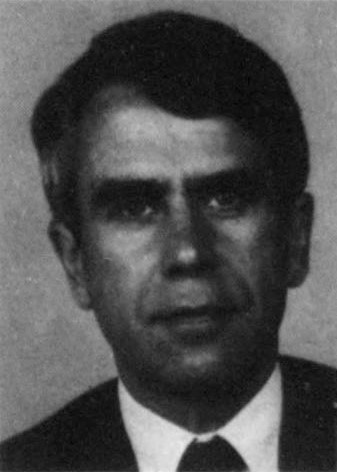
- Thomas M. T. Niles

16th Assistant Secretary of State for European and Canadian Affairs
- In office October 3, 1991 – April 1, 1993
- Preceded by: Raymond G.H. Seitz
- Succeeded by: Stephen A. Oxman

Personal details
- Born: September 22, 1939 Lexington, Kentucky, U.S.
- Died: April 30, 2025 (aged 85) Stamford, Connecticut, U.S.
- Parent: John Jacob Niles (father)
- Education: Harvard University; University of Kentucky

Thomas Michael Tolliver Niles (September 22, 1939 – April 30, 2025) was an American diplomat who served as a career Foreign Service Officer and United States Ambassador to Canada (1985–89), the European Union (1989–91), and Greece (1993–97). He later served as President and Vice Chairman of the United States Council for International Business and was a member of the American Academy of Diplomacy. He graduated from Harvard University and the University of Kentucky. Niles joined the Foreign Service in 1962. His father was the American composer John Jacob Niles. He died from cancer in Stamford, on April 30, 2025, at the age of 85.

Diplomatic posts
Preceded by Alfred H. Kingon	United States Ambassador to the European Union; September 10, 1985 – June 28, 1989	Succeeded by James F. Dobbins
Preceded by Paul H. Robinson, Jr.	United States Ambassador to Canada; June 23, 1989 – August 26, 1991	Succeeded by Edward Ney
Preceded by Michael G. Sotirhos	United States Ambassador to Greece; November 8, 1993 – September 27, 1997	Succeeded by R. Nicholas Burns
Government offices
Preceded by Raymond G. H. Seitz	Assistant Secretary of State for European and Canadian Affairs; October 3, 1991 – April 1, 1993	Succeeded by Stephen A. Oxman
