= Jamila Afghani =

Afghan women's rights activist (born 1976)

- جمیله افغانی
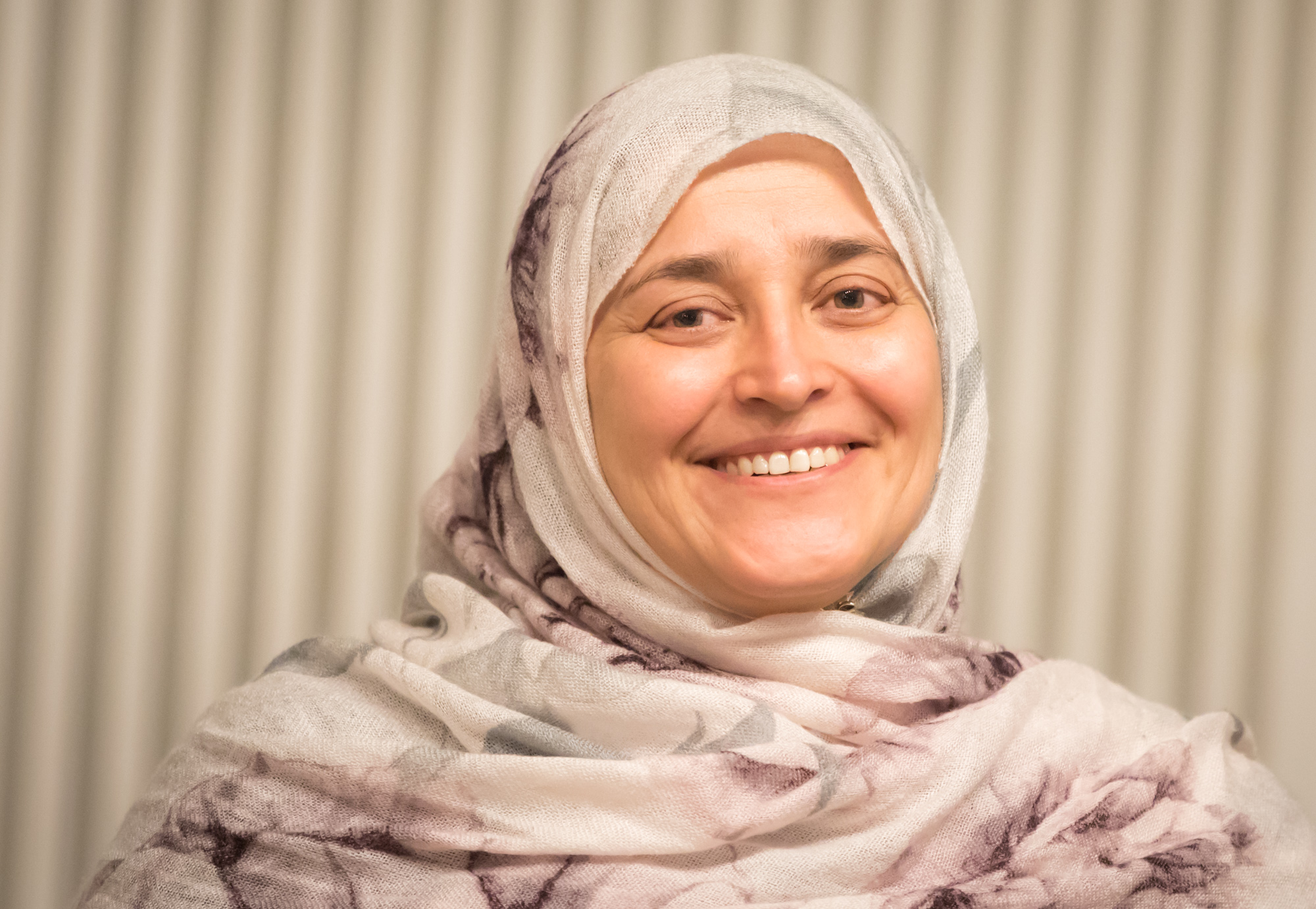
- Jamila Afghani in 2020

Afghan Women's Network

Personal details
- Born: 1976 (age 49–50) Kabul, Republic of Afghanistan
- Occupation: Women's rights activist
- Awards: Aurora Prize for Awakening Humanity (2022)

Jamila Afghani (Note: Dari: جمیله افغانی) (born 1976) is an Afghan women's rights activist. She is the founder and executive director of the Noor Educational and Capacity Development Organization (NECDO). She is also an executive member of the umbrella organization Afghan Women's Network (AWN). In 2022, Jamila Afghani was awarded the seventh annual Aurora Prize for Awakening Humanity.

== Biography ==
Jamila Afghani was born in 1976 in Kabul, Afghanistan. As a child, Afghani had polio and because of complications from the disease has to depend on a brace to walk. When she was fourteen, she was shot in the head during the Soviet War.

Afghani fled Kabul in the 1990s during the Afghan civil war, settling in Peshawar. Afghani earned bachelor's and master's degrees from the University of Peshawar. Afghani's first job was as a social worker for Afghan refugee camps in Pakistan. She also helped women in the camps become literate through Qur'anic education classes.

Afghani has stated that one of the greatest barriers to women getting education is a lack of female teachers. In 2001, Afghani founded NECDO, to facilitate education for women and children. NECDO also teaches sign language, and has classes about conflict resolution and gender issues. NECDO is known for creating innovative ways to reach out to women and girls. For example, it created a library for girls, but they recruited boys to bring the girls to visit the library, awarding prizes to the boys for every five girls they brought. Her organization serves around 50,000 women in 22 provinces.

Afghani's work directly challenges the misconception that Islam supports violence against women. She created the first "gender-sensitive training in Afghanistan for Imams." She started the project by finding interested Imams to look at the information she and others had prepared. The Imams started preaching the new materials, which cover women's rights from an Islamic point of view, right away. In 2015, she had about 6,000 Imams working with the program. In Kabul, her program has "resulted in a series of khutbas (Friday sermons) in twenty of the city's influential mosques. Afghani has discovered through her work that "women's mouths get shut when they don't have Islamic justifications" because Afghan culture is very religious and conservative. Her gender training has had strong effects on men who did not realize that Islam allowed women's rights and has helped turn men into advocates for women. Afghani has said that the "program is its own kind of revolution because religious leaders once known for oppressing women now use the words of the Quran to promote fairness for them."

She also works to challenge the patriarchal tribal system of government in Afghanistan. She believes that one of the problems with Afghanistan is that the citizens are unable to distinguish the differences between "Islam, culture and politics." She states that she has been threatened by some Afghans who are against her teaching and promoting a peaceful interpretation of Islam.

Afghani was awarded the Tanenbaum Peacemaker in Action Award in 2008. In 2017, she was among the finalists nominated for the Aurora Prize for Awakening Humanity. In 2021, Jamila Afghani was nominated for the Aurora Prize for the second time and went on to become the 2022 Aurora Prize Laureate.
