= Palwasha Hassan =

Afghan women's rights activist

- پلوشہ حسن
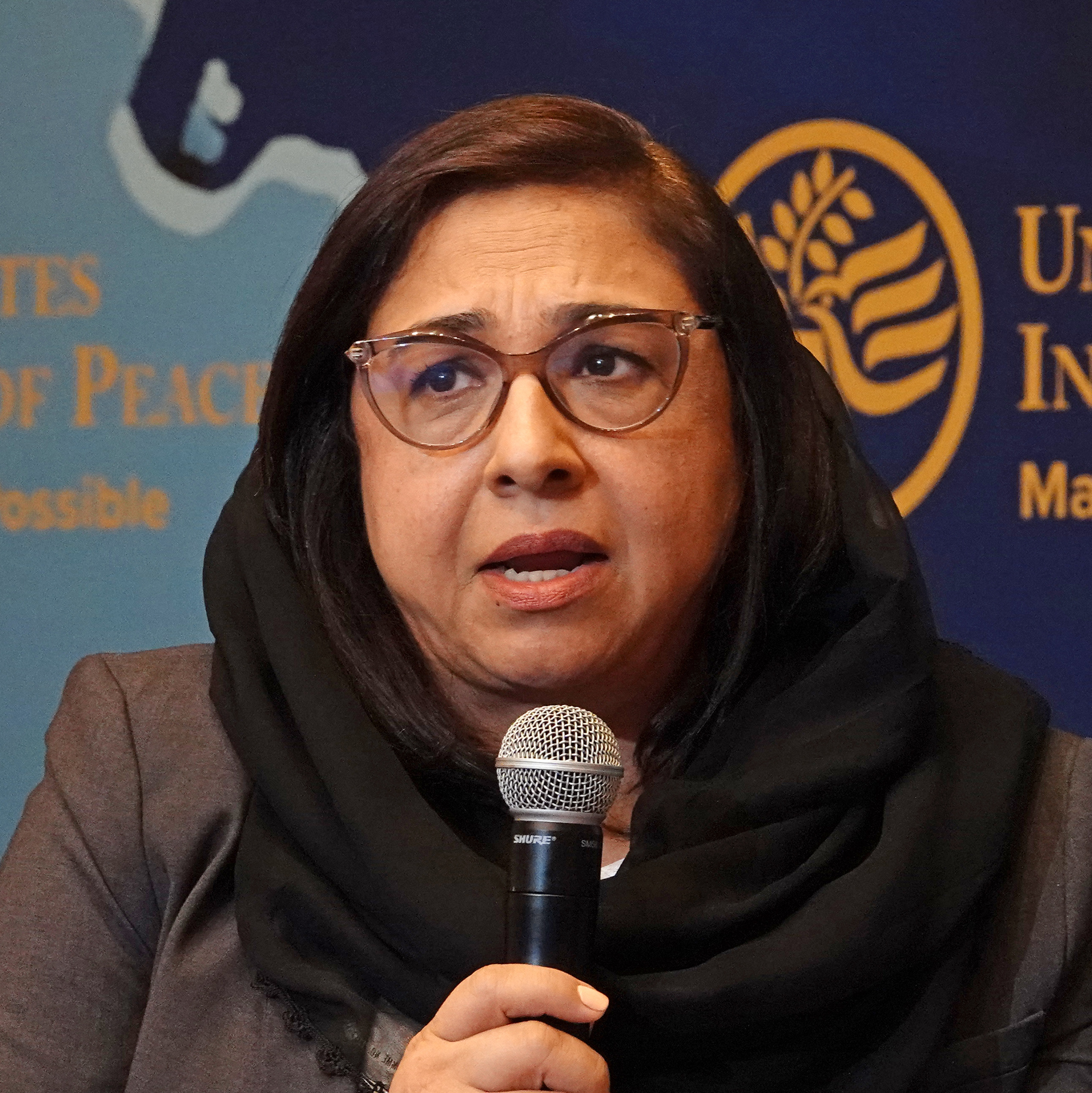
- Hassan in July 2022

Personal details
- Born: 1969 (age 56–57) Kabul, Afghanistan
- Occupation: Women's rights activist, peace activist

Palwasha Hassan (Pashto: پلوشہ حسن, born 1969 in Kabul, Afghanistan) is an Afghan women's rights and peace activist and former politician. She was the founder and executive director of the Kabul-based non-profit Afghan Women's Educational Center, founded in 1991.

Palwasha Hassan was one of 100 women delegates at the 2003 loya jirga that formed the new constitution. She contributed to the increase of women's representation in state affairs in the 2004 constitution, and other articles in it. In January 2010, Palwasha Hassan was picked to be the minister of women's affairs in the Karzai administration, but did not receive enough votes in the House of the People to assume office.

She holds a master's degree in Post-war Recovery Studies from the University of York.

In 2022 Hassan was the US Institute of Peace's Jennings Randolph Afghanistan Fellow. She was employed as their "Director for Rights and Democracy" for Afghanistan.

== Awards ==
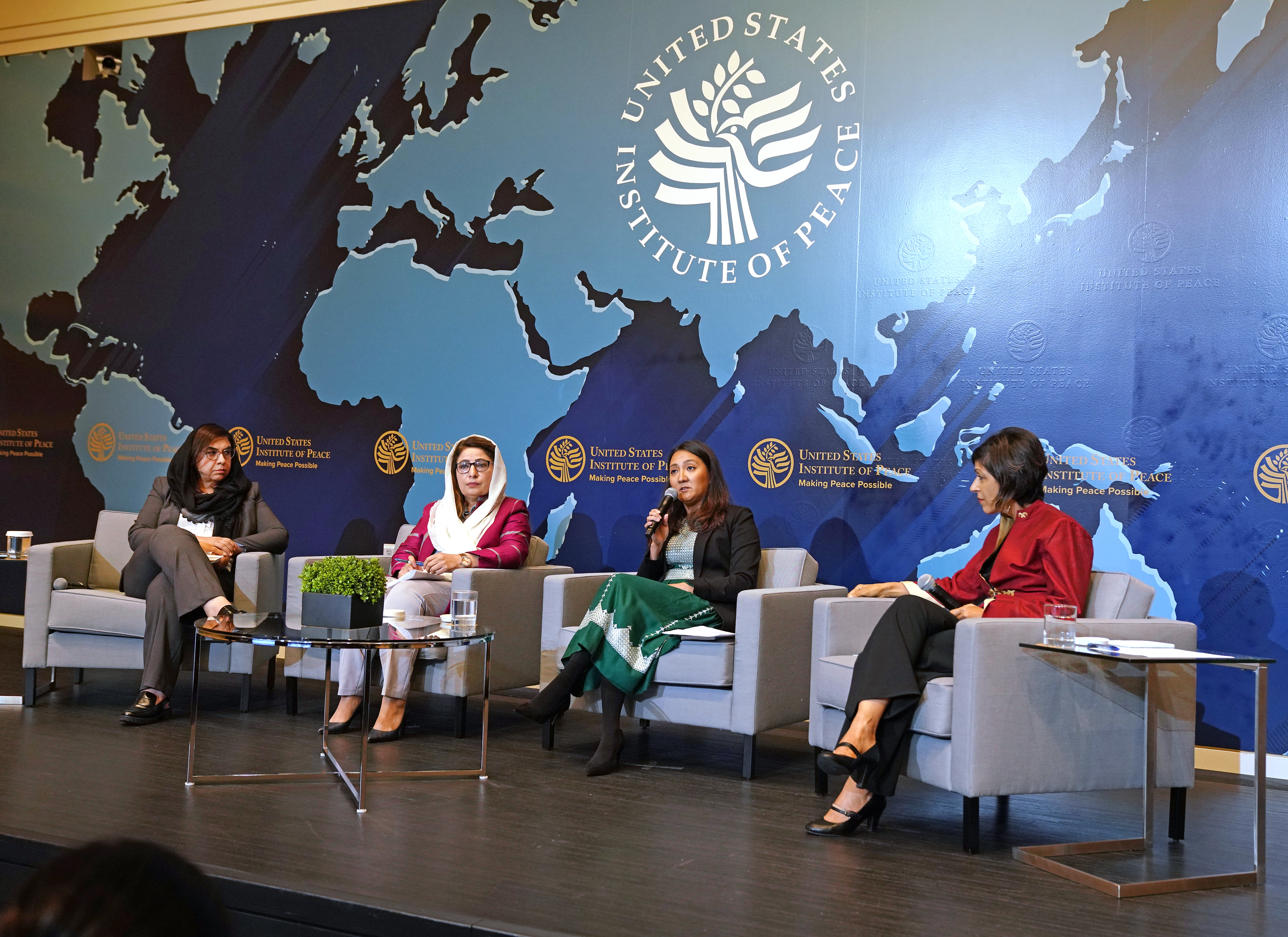
Discussion about "Engaging Afghan Women and Civil Society in U.S. Policymaking" in 2022. Left to right: Hassan, Asila Wardak, Naheed Sarabi and Rina Amiri

Palwasha Hassan was one of 1,000 women nominees for the 2005 Nobel Peace Prize. She was also one of 11 Afghan women who were jointly finalists in the 2021 Sakharov Prize, the European Parliament's annual human rights prize, which was given that year to Alexei Navalny.

In December 2021 she was awarded the Hillary Rodham Clinton Award for her efforts in promoting women's rights and peace.
