= Stephen A. Oxman =

American government official (born 1945)

17th Assistant Secretary of State for European and Canadian Affairs
- In office April 2, 1993 – August 15, 1994
- President: Bill Clinton
- Preceded by: Thomas M. T. Niles
- Succeeded by: Richard Holbrooke

Personal details
- Born: 1945 (age 80–81)
- Education: Princeton University (BA); Oxford University (PhD); Yale University (JD)

Stephen Alan Oxman (born 1945) was United States Assistant Secretary of State for European and Canadian Affairs from 1993 to 1994.

== Biography ==
Stephen A. Oxman was educated at Princeton University, graduating magna cum laude with a B.A. in 1967. He then earned a J.D. at Yale University, before becoming a Rhodes Scholar at Oxford University, where he earned a Ph.D.

In 1973, Oxman joined the law firm of Cravath, Swaine & Moore as an associate attorney. He left Cravath in 1977 when he became Executive Assistant to United States Deputy Secretary of State Warren Christopher. He later became a consultant to United States Secretary of State Cyrus Vance during the Iran hostage crisis.

Following the end of the Carter administration, in 1980, Oxman joined Shearman & Sterling as a litigation partner. In 1988, he moved to the newly founded investment bank of Wasserstein Perella & Co.

In 1981, he was selected to be one of the first Young Leaders of the French-American Foundation.

In 1993, President of the United States Bill Clinton nominated Oxman as Assistant Secretary of State for European and Canadian Affairs, and he held this office from April 2, 1993 until August 15, 1994.

Upon leaving government service in 1994, Oxman joined Wolfensohn & Company, a private investment and advisory firm founded by James Wolfensohn, as a senior partner. Bankers Trust acquired Wolfensohn & Co. in 1996, and Oxman became Senior Managing Director of BT Wolfensohn. He left Wolfensohn & Co. for Morgan Stanley in 1999.

Oxman currently serves as a trustee of Princeton University.

Government offices
Preceded by Thomas M. T. Niles	Assistant Secretary of State for European and Canadian Affairs; April 2, 1993 – August 15, 1994	Succeeded by Richard Holbrooke
