= Raymond G. H. Seitz =

American diplomat

Raymond Seitz
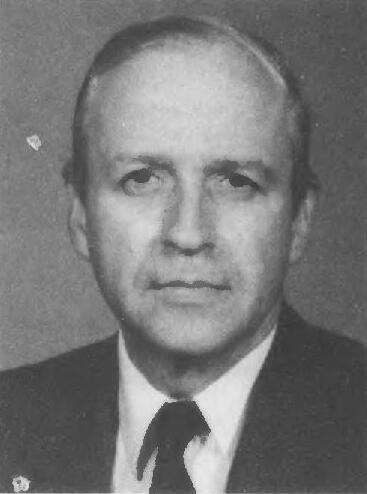

United States Ambassador to the United Kingdom
- In office June 25, 1991 – May 10, 1994
- President: George H. W. Bush; Bill Clinton
- Preceded by: Henry E. Catto Jr.
- Succeeded by: William J. Crowe

15th Assistant Secretary of State for European and Canadian Affairs
- In office August 8, 1989 – April 30, 1991
- President: George H. W. Bush
- Preceded by: Rozanne L. Ridgway
- Succeeded by: Thomas Niles

Personal details
- Born: December 8, 1940 (age 85) Honolulu, Territory of Hawaii (now State of Hawaii)
- Parent: John F. R. Seitz (father)
- Education: Yale University (BA)
- Profession: Diplomat

Raymond George Hardenbergh Seitz (born December 8, 1940) is a former career diplomat and U.S. Ambassador to the United Kingdom. He was born in Honolulu, Hawaii on December 8, 1940. He is the son of United States Army Major General John F. R. Seitz (d. 1978) and Helen (Hardenbergh) Seitz (d. 1953).

He graduated from Yale University in 1963 with a BA in history, following which he spent two years teaching in Dallas, Texas. He joined the US Foreign Service in 1966. He was the first career diplomat in modern history to be made Ambassador to the UK – the post is usually given to a political appointee.

== Career ==
- Seitz's first posting was in Montreal, Quebec, Canada as Consular Officer.
- In 1968 he was assigned to Nairobi, Kenya as Political Officer, serving concurrently as Vice-Consul in the Seychelle Islands.
- After two years as Principal Officer in Bukavu, Zaire, he returned to the State Department in 1972 to be appointed Director of the Secretariat Staff under Secretary of State Henry Kissinger.
- He subsequently served as Special Assistant to the Director General of the Foreign Service.
- In 1975 he was assigned for the first time to the US Embassy in London as First Secretary.
- In 1978 he received the Director General's Award for Reporting.
- He returned to Washington 1979 as Deputy Executive Secretary to the Department of State, serving in the offices of Secretaries of State Vance, Muskie and Haig.
- In October 1981, he became Deputy Assistant Secretary for Public Affairs.
- In July 1982, Secretary of State George Shultz appointed him Executive Assistant to the Secretary of State.
- Three years later, he returned to the London Embassy as Minister.
- In 1986 and 1988 he received the Presidential Award for Meritorious Service.
- President Bush nominated him as Assistant Secretary of State for European and Canadian Affairs in June 1989.
- On completion of his term as Assistant Secretary of State, the Federal Republic of Germany conferred on Ambassador Seitz the Knight Commander's Cross.
- He served in this capacity until his nomination by the President as Ambassador Extraordinary and Plenipotentiary of the United States of America to the United Kingdom of Great Britain and Northern Ireland. His nomination was received in the Senate on March 22, 1991, and the Senate granted confirmation on April 23, 1991.
- He was sworn in as ambassador to the Court of St. James's, by Secretary of State James Baker on April 25, 1991, and presented his credentials to Queen Elizabeth II on June 25, 1991.
- On May 10, 1994, he simultaneously resigned from his post as ambassador, and from the US Foreign Service, following a career of 28 years.

Seitz was a member of the Founding Council of the Rothermere American Institute at Oxford University.

== Retirement ==
Since retiring from the foreign service, Seitz has held numerous directorships, governorships, and trusteeships. He was Senior Managing Director at Lehman Brothers International from 1995 to 1996, and vice-chairman from 1996 to 2003. He has held non-executive directorships on the boards of British Airways, Hong Kong Telecom, Marconi, General Electric Company, Rio Tinto and Cable & Wireless. As of November 2004, he is currently on the boards of the Chubb Group, PCCW, and Hollinger International.

He was a trustee of the National Gallery between 1996 and 2001 and was a member of the Founding Council of the Rothermere American Institute, University of Oxford. He is a current governor of the Ditchley Foundation.

He is a former trustee of the Royal Academy of Arts and the World Monuments Fund. He is a former member of the Advisory Council of the Institute for International Studies at Stanford University.

He is married with three children.

== Honorary degrees ==
Seitz has received a number of honorary degrees, among them:

- Honorary Doctor of Public Administration, The American International University in London (Richmond), 1992
- Honorary Doctor of Laws, Reading University (UK), 1992
- Honorary Doctor of Laws, University of Bath (UK), 1993
- Honorary Doctor of Civil Law, University of Durham (UK), 1994
- Honorary Doctorate from Heriot-Watt University in November 1994
- Honorary Doctor of Laws, Leicester University (UK), 23 July 1999
- Honorary Doctor of Civil Law, University of Newcastle upon Tyne (UK), 13 October 1999

He has also received honorary degrees from the universities of Buckingham, Royal Holloway, Leeds, and the Open University.

== Awards ==
- 1999: Awarded the Churchill Medal of Honour by the English-Speaking Union.
- 1999: Became the first American citizen ever to be awarded the Freedom of the City of London.
- 2001: Elected as an Honorary Freeman of the Merchant Taylors' Company.

== Publications ==
Seitz has written several articles for the Daily Telegraph, Sunday Telegraph, The Times and The Literary Review, as well as broadcasting several essays for the BBC. He published his first book, Over Here in 1998, an autobiographical review of his time as ambassador and life in the UK.

== Notes ==
Government offices
Preceded by Rozanne L. Ridgway	Assistant Secretary of State for European and Canadian Affairs; August 8, 1989 – April 30, 1991	Succeeded by Thomas Niles
Diplomatic posts
Preceded by Henry Catto	United States Ambassador to the United Kingdom; 1991–1994	Succeeded by William J. Crowe, Jr.
