= Sophie Beau =

French humanitarian

Sophie Beau is a French humanitarian. She is the co-founder and general manager of SOS Méditerranée. She lives in Marseille.

== Biography ==
Sophie Beau was born in Tours.

Her father, Bertrand, was a doctor and her mother, Christiane, was working in a neighborhood social center. They live in Indre-et-Loire where they have set up a reception group for refugees.

She studied anthropology and political science in Paris, and got involved in literacy activities in an African household. In Mali, she studied the impact of migration on development projects.

Between 1998 and 2008 she worked for Médecins sans frontières and Médecins du monde, as project manager in the Middle East, the Maghreb, Guinea, Lebanon, Georgia, Palestine, etc. or at the head office, before committing to the fight against social exclusion in Marseille, for the Fédération nationale des associations d’accueil et de réinsertion sociale (FNARS).

== With SOS Méditerranée ==
In March 2015, she met the German merchant marine captain Klaus Vogel, with whom she launched SOS Méditerranée in May 2015; she is particularly involved in fundraising. Since March 2017, she has worked full time for SOS Méditerranée.

In 2018, according to the ranking by Vanity Fair, she was one of the most influential French personalities in the world.

In 2020, together with Klaus Vogel, she was recipient of an Aurora Humanitarian award.

In 2023, at a meeting timed during the visit of Pope Francis in Marseille, she said "...Ten years after the shipwreck off Lampedusa, we urgently call for global sea rescue missions and for the recognition of the valuable support of humanitarian Search and Rescue organisations."
