= Afghan Women's Network =

Non-governmental organization

The Afghan Women's Network (AWN) is a non-governmental organization (NGO) which was created in 1996 by Afghan women following the World Conference on Women in Beijing and works to "empower women and ensure their equal participation in Afghan society."

== About ==
The AWN sustains the vision of an Afghanistan in which women & men live in a justice and discrimination free society. AWN's axis of focus are:

- Women, peace and security
- Women's political participation and leadership
- Women's social and legal protection

The AWN acts as a foundation supporting other women's rights-oriented NGO in Afghanistan and Pakistan. The AWN receives funding from donor agencies such as the French Embassy, ActionAid, UNHCR, and Roland Berger Foundation. It operates from Kabul, Heart, Balkh, Kandahar, Bamyan, Paktia, Nangarhar, and Kunduz, ... It has more than 3,500 individual members (exclusively women) and 125 women's organizations with memberships.

Executive board members have included Manizha Wafeq and the current executive director is Hassina Safi.

== History ==
The Afghan Women's Network was established in 1995. Women who had participated in the United Nation Fourth World Conference on Women in Beijing, China decided that they wanted to create a network for Afghan women.

In 2013, The AWN played an active role in the curation of the exhibit Women Between Peace and War: Afghanistan by Leslie Thomas from ArtWORKS Projects for Human Rights.

In March 2014, the AWN launched the Afghan Women Vision 2024, the ONG's official newspaper supported by the Heinrich Boell Foundation. In 2014, the ONG stated that 150 honor killings affected Afghan women each year. Upon the progressive withdrawal of US troops from Afghanistan, the AWN brought its focus on maintaining the women's rights benefits gained during the presence of the US troops.

In February 2015, the AWN took part to the marches asking the president Ashraf Ghani to respect his word and name 4 women ministries in his government for fair gender representation. In 2016, the ONG spoke out about the revival of public executions of women in Afghanistan following the new peak of influence from the Taliban.

== See also ==
- Jamila Afghani
- Farida Azizi
- Taliban treatment of women
- Asila Wardak
