= Klaus Vogel (captain) =

German historian (born 1956)

Klaus (Anselm) Vogel (born 1956 in Hamburg) is a German historian and merchant sea captain who has been the founding chairman of the German sea rescue organization SOS Méditerranée since 2015.

After graduating from high school, Klaus Vogel went to sea on merchant ships, graduated from the Bremen University of Nautical Sciences (today part of the University of Bremen) and in 1981 acquired his “Patent auf großer Fahrt”. From 1983 he studied history, philosophy and economics in Göttingen, Bielefeld and Paris. In 1995 he received his doctorate with the study 'Sphaera terrae - das mittelalterliche Bild der Erde und die kosmographische Revolution' ("Sphaera terrae - the medieval image of the earth and the cosmographic revolution") at the University of Göttingen. In the same year he founded the “Göttingen Working Group for Interdisciplinary Research on Violence” with Manfred Cierpka. He was a fellow of the Alexander von Humboldt Foundation in Rome and worked at the Max Planck Institute for History in Göttingen. Since October 2000 Vogel has been sailing again, since 2005 as captain and since 2007 on container ships of the Hapag-Lloyd shipping company. Since 2015 he has dedicated himself to the sea rescue of refugees in the Mediterranean.

In 2016, he accepted the "Schwarzkopf Europe Award" on behalf of SOS Méditerranée.

In 2020, together with Sophie Beau, he was recipient of an Aurora Humanitarian award.

In 2023, Klaus Vogel made an acceptance speech for the Right Livelihood Award 2023, made to the European search and rescue organisation SOS Mediterranee.
