= St Camille Association =

St Camille Association or Association Saint-Camille de Lellis was founded in 1994 by Grégoire Ahongbonon to provide residential care for people in West Africa with mental illness.

== History ==
Ahongbonon was born in Benin and immigrated to Ivory Coast, and was formerly a mechanic.

As of 2005, SCA had 12 centres in Ivory Coast and Benin. As of 2023, they have 18 centres across Ivory Coast, Benin, and Togo.

The centres aim to reduce the number of people being 'treated' in West African Prayer Centres in which chaining mentally ill individuals to posts or trees is common practise. Founder Grégoire Ahongbonon said "As long as there is one man in chains, it is humanity who is chained."

The St Camille health centres provide basic personal care such as providing clean water and food, shelter, and washing/cutting hair. Patients are then given an official diagnosis and prescribed medication at an affordable price. Even within these clinics, some patients have their legs chained to stop them from running away. However, the standard of care is generally far superior to other options available.

One concern with the organisation is that as there is not enough staff to routinely monitor patients long-term, some may be over-medicated. People experiencing a single acute psychotic episode could be prescribed heavy psychotropic medication for the remainder of their life, experiencing unnecessary side effects. Additionally, most of the care is provided by nurses, often without adequate supervision from psychiatric specialists due to staff shortages.

== See also ==
- Camillus de Lellis
