= Richard Holbrooke =

American diplomat and author (1941–2010)

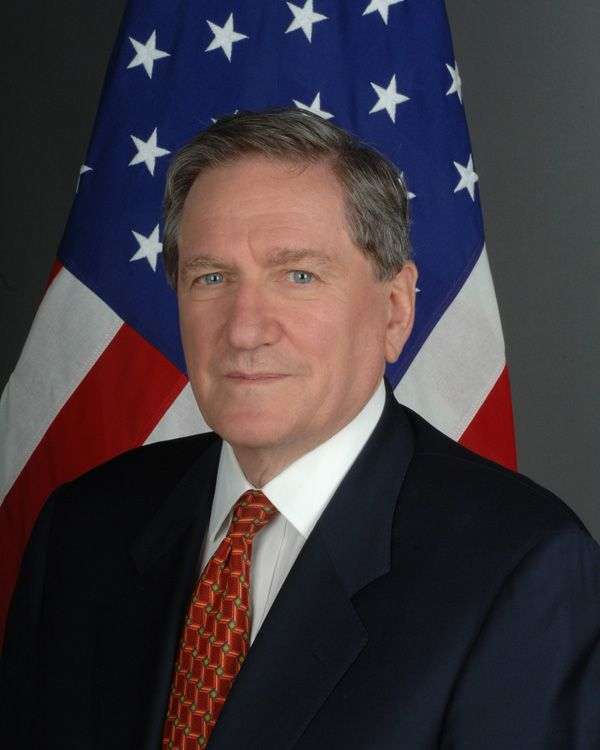

United States Special Representative for Afghanistan and Pakistan
- In office January 22, 2009 – December 13, 2010
- President: Barack Obama
- Preceded by: Position established
- Succeeded by: Marc Grossman

22nd United States Ambassador to the United Nations
- In office September 7, 1999 – January 20, 2001
- President: Bill Clinton
- Preceded by: Peter Burleigh (acting)
- Succeeded by: John Negroponte

18th Assistant Secretary of State for European and Canadian Affairs
- In office September 13, 1994 – February 21, 1996
- President: Bill Clinton
- Preceded by: Stephen A. Oxman
- Succeeded by: John C. Kornblum

United States Ambassador to Germany
- In office October 19, 1993 – September 12, 1994
- President: Bill Clinton
- Preceded by: Robert M. Kimmitt
- Succeeded by: Charles E. Redman

14th Assistant Secretary of State for East Asian and Pacific Affairs
- In office March 31, 1977 – January 20, 1981
- President: Jimmy Carter
- Preceded by: Arthur W. Hummel Jr.
- Succeeded by: John H. Holdridge

Personal details
- Born: Richard Charles Albert Holbrooke; April 24, 1941 New York City, U.S.
- Died: December 13, 2010 (aged 69) Washington, D.C., U.S.
- Party: Democratic
- Spouses: Larrine Sullivan (m. 1964; div. 1972); Blythe Babyak (m. 1977; div. 1978); Kati Marton (m. 1995)
- Children: 2
- Education: Brown University (BA)

Richard Charles Albert Holbrooke (April 24, 1941 – December 13, 2010) was an American diplomat and author. He was the only person to have held the position of Assistant Secretary of State for two different regions of the world, (Asia from 1977 to 1981 and Europe from 1994 to 1996) assisting in brokering a peace agreement among the warring factions in Bosnia leading to the signing of the Dayton Peace Accords. Holbrooke was a prime contender to succeed Warren Christopher as Secretary of State but was passed over in 1996 as President Bill Clinton chose Madeleine Albright instead.

From 1999 to 2001, Holbrooke served as U.S. Ambassador to the United Nations. He was an adviser to the presidential campaign of Senator John Kerry in 2004. Holbrooke then joined the 2008 presidential campaign of Senator Hillary Clinton and became a top foreign policy adviser. Holbrooke was considered a likely candidate for Secretary of State had Kerry or Hillary Clinton been elected president. In January 2009, Holbrooke was appointed as a special adviser on Pakistan and Afghanistan, working under President Barack Obama and Secretary of State Hillary Clinton. During his career, Holbrooke worked to improve the lives of refugees, particularly the Hmong of Indochina. On December 13, 2010, Holbrooke died from complications of an aortic dissection.

Holbrooke's unfulfilled ambition was to become Secretary of State; he, along with George Kennan and Chip Bohlen, were considered among the most influential U.S. diplomats who never achieved that position. Several considered Holbrooke's role in the Dayton Accords to merit the Nobel Peace Prize.

== Early life ==
Holbrooke was born on April 24, 1941, in New York City, to Dan Holbrooke (né Goldbrajch), a doctor, and Trudi Kearl (née Moos), a potter; brother, Andrew, survives him. Holbrooke's mother, whose Jewish family fled Hamburg in 1933 for Buenos Aires before coming to New York, took him to Quaker meetings on Sundays. She stated: "I was an atheist, his father was an atheist... We never thought of giving Richard a Jewish upbringing. The Quaker meetings seemed interesting."

Holbrooke's father, who died of colon cancer when Richard was 15 years old, was born of Polish Jewish parents in Warsaw and took the name Holbrooke after migrating to the United States in 1939. The original family name was Goldbrajch. During his teens, Holbrooke spent more time at the house of his friend David Rusk than his own home. David's father was Dean Rusk who became President Kennedy's Secretary of State in 1960. Rusk inspired Holbrooke; however, he did not give him any special treatment during his career.

After Scarsdale High School, Holbrooke earned a Bachelor of Arts in history from Brown University in 1962, attending on a full-tuition scholarship. He was later a fellow at the Woodrow Wilson School of Public and International Affairs at Princeton University, leaving in 1970. At Brown, Holbrooke was the Editor-in-Chief of the Brown Daily Herald in his senior year (1961–62).

== Career ==
=== Foreign Service (1962–1969) ===
President John F. Kennedy's call to service inspired Holbrooke to enter government work. A few weeks after college graduation, Holbrooke entered the Foreign Service where he underwent Vietnamese language training. He served for six years in Vietnam, first in the Mekong Delta, as a civilian representative for the Agency for International Development working on the rural Pacification Program, a program supporting the South Vietnam government with economic development and enacting local political reforms. Holbrooke later became a staff assistant to Ambassadors Maxwell Taylor and Henry Cabot Lodge Jr., by securing the position from his best friend, Anthony Lake.

During this time, he served with many other young diplomats who would play a major role in American foreign policy in the decades ahead, including John Negroponte, Frank G. Wisner, Les Aspin and Peter Tarnoff. When Holbrooke was 24, he joined a team of experts, formed by President Lyndon Johnson that was separate from the National Security Council.

Following his time in the White House, Holbrooke served as a special assistant to Under Secretaries of State (then the number-two position in the State Department) Nicholas Katzenbach and Elliot Richardson. In 1968, Holbrooke was asked to be part of the American delegation to the 1968 Paris peace talks, which was led by former New York Governor Averell Harriman and Deputy Secretary of Defense Cyrus Vance. He also drafted a volume of the Pentagon Papers, a top-secret report on the government's decision-making in Vietnam. Following these assignments, Holbrooke spent a year as a mid-career fellow at the Woodrow Wilson School at Princeton University.

=== Peace Corps and Foreign Policy (1970–1976) ===
In 1970, at his own request, Holbrooke was assigned to be the Peace Corps Director in Morocco. Holbrooke initially rejected an offer to become the editor of the magazine Foreign Policy instead recommending his friend, John Campbell. After two years, he left the Foreign Service to become the managing editor of the magazine after Campbell died of thyroid cancer. Holbrooke held the position from 1972 to 1976. During his tenure, the magazine ran investigative reports on Vietnam and the Middle East which disturbed some members of the foreign policy community. At the same time (1974–75), he was a consultant to the President's Commission on the Organization of the Government for the Conduct of Foreign Policy and was a contributing editor to Newsweek International.

=== Carter Administration (1977–1981) ===
In the summer of 1976, Holbrooke left Foreign Policy to serve as campaign coordinator for national security affairs to Governor Jimmy Carter (D-Ga.) in his bid for the White House. During the campaign, Holbrooke helped Carter prepare for his foreign policy debates with President Gerald Ford. After Carter's victory, Holbrooke followed in the footsteps of such diplomatic mentors as Philip Habib, Dean Rusk and Averell Harriman and, on March 31, 1977, became Assistant Secretary of State for East Asian and Pacific Affairs, making him the youngest person ever to hold that position, a post he held until 1981. While at State, he was a top adviser to Secretary of State Cyrus Vance. During his service, he feuded with Carter's National Security Advisor, Zbigniew Brzezinski, although they both held similar positions on policy. Holbrooke oversaw a warming with Cold War adversaries in the region, culminating in the normalization of relations with China in December 1978. He was also deeply involved in bringing hundreds of thousands of Indochinese refugees to the United States, thus beginning a lifelong involvement with the refugee issue.

=== East Timor controversy ===
In August 1977, then Assistant Secretary of State, Holbrooke traveled to Indonesia to meet with President Suharto in the midst of Indonesia's occupation of East Timor, in which over 100,000 East Timorese were ultimately killed or starved to death. According to Brad Simpson, director of the Indonesia and East Timor Documentation Project at the National Security Archives, Holbrooke had visited officially to press for human rights reform but, after meeting Suharto, had instead praised him for Indonesia's human rights improvements, for the steps that Indonesia had taken to open East Timor to the West, and for allowing a delegation of congressmen to enter the territory under strict military guard, where they were greeted by staged celebrations welcoming the Indonesian armed forces.

=== Wall Street years (1981–1993) ===
In January 1981, Holbrooke left government and became both senior advisor to Lehman Brothers and vice president of Public Strategies, a consulting firm he formed with James A. Johnson, a former top aide to Walter Mondale. From 1985 until 1993, Holbrooke served as managing director of Lehman Brothers. During this time, he co-authored Counsel to the President, The New York Times best-selling memoirs of legendary Democratic wise man and Defense Secretary Clark Clifford, published in 1991. He was a top policy adviser to then-Senator Al Gore (D-TN) during his 1988 campaign for the Democratic presidential nomination. And four years later he advised Bill Clinton, in his quest for the White House.

Holbrooke also remained deeply engaged in prominent foreign policy issues. He visited Bosnia twice in 1992 as a private citizen and a member of the board of Refugees International, witnessing firsthand the damage and devastating human costs of the conflict. This experience committed Holbrooke to pursuing a more aggressive policy in the Balkans and, in a memo to his colleagues, he urged that "Bosnia will be the key test of American policy in Europe. We must therefore succeed in whatever we attempt."

=== U.S. Ambassador to Germany (1993–1994) ===
In 1993, after Bill Clinton became president, Holbrooke was initially slated to be Ambassador to Japan due to his depth of knowledge and long experience in Asian affairs. However, this appointment eventually went to former Vice President Walter Mondale, and Holbrooke unexpectedly was appointed Ambassador to Germany. In 1992, Holbrooke was also a member of the Carnegie Commission on America and a Changing World and chairman and principal author of the bipartisan Commission on Government and Renewal, sponsored by the Carnegie Foundation and the Peterson Institute. He was chairman and principal author of the "Memo to the President-Elect: Harnessing Process to Purpose," a blue-ribbon Commission report sponsored by the Carnegie Endowment for International Peace and the Institute for International Economics.

Holbrooke served in Germany during a dramatic moment: only a few years after German reunification, he helped shape U.S. relations with a new Germany. A highlight of his tenure was President Bill Clinton's visit to Berlin in July 1994, when thousands of Germans crammed the streets to welcome the American leader. While in Germany, Holbrooke also was a key figure in shaping the U.S. policy to promote NATO enlargement, as well as its approach to the war in Bosnia.

In 1994, while serving as U.S. Ambassador to Germany, he conceived the idea of a cultural exchange center between the people of Berlin and Americans. With Richard von Weizsäcker, former President of Germany, and Henry A. Kissinger as co-chairman, this institution—The American Academy in Berlin—was announced on September 9, 1994, the day after the U.S. Army Berlin Brigade left Berlin. The American Academy in Berlin opened three years later in a villa on the Wannsee once owned by the German-Jewish banker Hans Arnhold. The American Academy in Berlin is now (as of 2009) one of the most important links between Germany and the United States. Its Fellows have included writers (including Pulitzer Prize winning authors Arthur Miller and Jeffrey Eugenides), economists, government officials, and public policy experts such as Dennis Ross and former U.S. Ambassador to The People's Republic of China, J. Stapleton Roy. In 2008, The American Academy in Berlin awarded its annual Henry A. Kissinger Award for Transatlantic Relations to George H. W. Bush. In 2007, the Award's first recipient was former German Chancellor Helmut Schmidt.

=== Assistant Secretary of State for European and Eurasian Affairs (1994–1996) ===
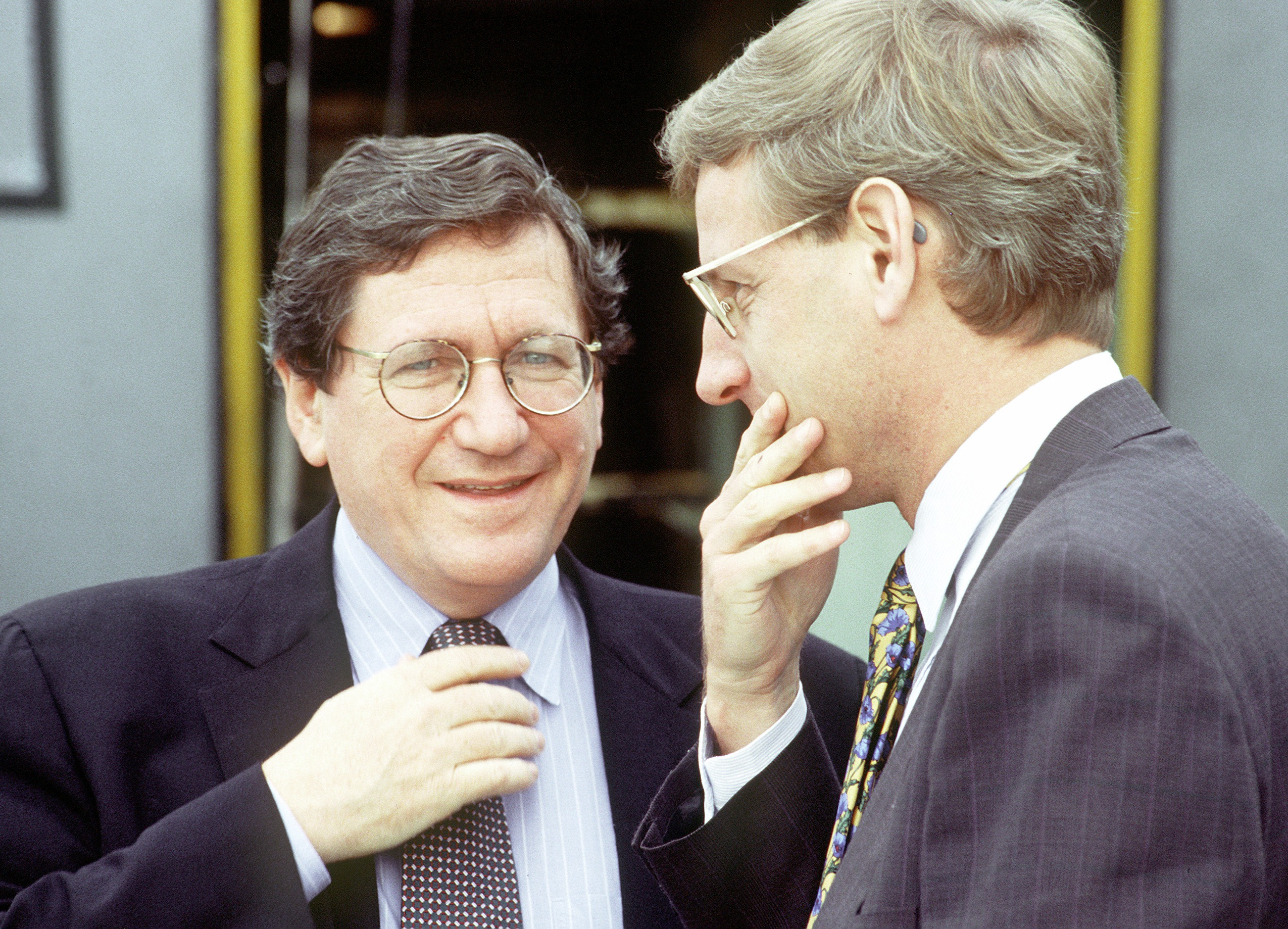
Holbrooke and Carl Bildt before peace talks in Sarajevo, Bosnia and Herzegovina in October 1995

In 1994, Holbrooke returned to Washington to become the assistant secretary for European and Eurasian Affairs, a position he held until 1996, when he resigned for personal reasons (he had recently married the author Kati Marton and wished to return to New York). While assistant secretary, Holbrooke led the effort to implement the policy to enlarge NATO and had the distinction of leading the negotiation team charged with resolving the Balkans crisis.

On August 19, an armoured personnel carrier following the Humvee Holbrooke was riding in fell off the side of Mt. Igman near Sarajevo. Three of Holbrooke's five-man delegation team perished in the incident. In Holbrooke's telling of the incident, he portrayed himself and the other surviving member of his delegation, General Clark, as active participants in the rescue mission. However, Holbrooke's biographer George Packer, discredited Holbrooke's story, stating that another man traveling with the delegation, Colonel Banky, was in fact the person who searched for the APC while Holbrooke and Clark waited near the Humvee. A report on the incident stated that the driver of the APC was going too fast.

In Paris in December 1995, Holbrooke was the chief architect of the Dayton Peace Accords which ended the three-and-a-half-year-long war in Bosnia. In 1996, he was awarded the Manfred Wörner Medal, awarded by the German Ministry of Defense for public figures who have rendered "special meritorious service to peace and freedom in Europe."

=== Balkan envoy (1996–1999) ===
External videos
- Booknotes interview with Holbrooke on To End a War, July 26, 1998, C-SPAN
- Presentation by Holbrooke to the National Press Club on To End a War, June 18, 1998, C-SPAN

Upon leaving the State Department, Holbrooke was asked by President Clinton to become, as a private citizen, a special envoy to the Balkans given his service in the region. In 1997, Holbrooke became a special envoy to Cyprus and the Balkans on a pro-bono basis as a private citizen. During 1998 and 1999, in his capacity as special presidential envoy, Holbrooke worked to end the conflict between the armed forces of the Federal Republic of Yugoslavia and the Kosovo Liberation Army (KLA), who were fighting for an independent Kosovo in the Kosovo War. Holbrooke returned to Bosnia two years later to the city of Sarajevo. In March 1999 he traveled to Belgrade to deliver the ultimatum to Yugoslav president Slobodan Milošević before the NATO attack began. Holbrooke was strongly anti-Serbia and referred to Serbs as "murderous assholes". Holbrooke wrote numerous articles about his experiences in the Balkans, and in 1998, published the widely acclaimed book, To End a War, a memoir of his time as the chief negotiator of the Dayton Peace Accords, ending the Bosnian civil war. The New York Times ranked the book as one of the eleven best books of the year in 1998. In his book he assessed Bosnian president Alija Izetbegovic negatively stating, "although he paid lip service to the principles of a multi-ethnic state, he was not the democrat that some supporters in the West saw".

According to Radovan Karadžić and Muhamed Sacirbey, ex-Bosnian foreign minister, Holbrooke signed an agreement with Karadžić that if the latter withdrew from politics he would not be sent to the Hague tribunal. Holbrooke denied these terms, saying Karadžić's statement was "a flat-out lie."

Holbrooke and Bildt were considered candidates for the Nobel Peace Prize as a result of the Dayton Peace Accords. However, Holbrooke's personal lobbying for the award may have been detrimental to their chances.

=== U.S. Ambassador to the United Nations (1999–2001) ===
In August 1999, Holbrooke was sworn in as the 22nd U.S. Ambassador to the United Nations, replacing Bill Richardson. Holbrooke initially had issues passing the Senate because of perceived abuses of authority while as Clinton's Balkan envoy. During his tenure, Holbrooke was known for innovation and for achieving diplomatic breakthroughs that settled a series of longstanding tensions in the United States' relationship with the UN. His highest-profile accomplishment was negotiating a historic deal between the United States and the UN's then 188-Member States to settle the bulk of arrears owed by the United States to the United Nations. The deal, achieved with the agreement of the UN's entire membership in late December 2000, lowered the rate of UN dues paid by the United States to the UN, fulfilling the terms of a U.S. law championed by Senators Jesse Helms (R-NC) and Joseph Biden (D-DE). In return for the reduction, the United States paid the UN over $900 million in back dues. During his time as ambassador Hobrooke forwent the official ambassador's residence at the Waldorf Astoria hotel instead letting his chief of staff temporarily use the residence.

Holbrooke secured a reduction in U.S. dues to the UN despite a booming American economy by enfolding the U.S. position within a broad push to update the UN's long-outdated financial system. As negotiations reached a critical phase in the fall of 2000, Holbrooke bridged a gap between what the United States was legally permitted to pay and the amounts the rest of the UN membership were willing to shoulder by securing an unprecedented contribution by billionaire Ted Turner, founder of the UN Foundation. Holbrooke and his team received a standing ovation in the United States Senate Foreign Relations Committee when the terms of the deal were presented.

Holbrooke's other achievements as UN Ambassador included getting the United Nations Security Council to debate and pass a resolution on HIV/AIDS, the first time that body had treated public health as a matter of global security. In January 2000, Holbrooke used the United States' presidency of the UN Security Council to spotlight a series of crises in Africa, holding six consecutive UN debates that brought together leaders from the region and the across the globe, including former South African President Nelson Mandela and then U.S. Vice President Al Gore, to catalyze more effective UN interventions in the Democratic Republic of Congo, Angola, and elsewhere. Ambassador Holbrooke's lobbying kept Sudan off the UN Human RIghts Commission in 2000 due to the genocide and chattel slavery practiced in the country. Holbrooke decried a "double standard" whereby African conflicts received insufficient global attention.

In 2000, Holbrooke led a UN Security Council delegation in a series of diplomatic negotiations throughout Africa, including to the Democratic Republic of Congo, Zambia, Zimbabwe, Rwanda, and Uganda. Holbrooke also secured membership for Israel in the UN's Western European and Others regional group, ending Israel's historic exclusion from regional group deliberations and allowing it to, for the first time, stand for election to leadership positions in UN sub-bodies. During the final weeks of his term, Holbrooke secured consultative status at the United Nations for Hadassah, the Jewish women's service organization, overcoming strenuous objections from certain Arab delegations.

==== GBCHealth ====
In January 2000, when the United States was in the rotating presidency of the UN Security Council, Ambassador Holbrooke held an unprecedented meeting of the Security Council to discuss AIDS in Africa. No Security Council session in the history of the UN had ever been devoted to a health issue prior to this historic meeting. Vice President Al Gore presided over the Security Council and declared that AIDS was a security threat to all nations.

Upon leaving the UN a year later, Holbrooke took over a nearly moribund NGO that was intended to mobilize businesses and corporations in the fight against AIDS. At the time, it had 17 members. Over the next six years, Holbrooke turned this organization—originally called the Global Business Council on HIV/AIDS—into a worldwide organization with over 225 members. It expanded to include malaria and tuberculosis, becoming the Global Business Coalition on HIV/AIDS, Tuberculosis and Malaria in 2006. In 2011, the organization became GBCHealth and expanded its mandate to include an array of health issues. GBCHealth is the official focal point for mobilizing the business community in support of The Global Fund to Fight AIDS, Tuberculosis and Malaria, and has grown into an important part of the ongoing war against these three diseases.

=== Hillary Clinton's 2008 presidential campaign ===
Holbrooke was Clinton's lead foreign policy advisor in her 2008 campaign for president and was believed to be her preferred choice for Secretary of State. When Obama defeated Clinton and selected her as Secretary of State, Holbrooke was her preferred option for Deputy Secretary of State, but was vetoed by Obama.

=== Special representative for Afghanistan and Pakistan (2009–2010) ===
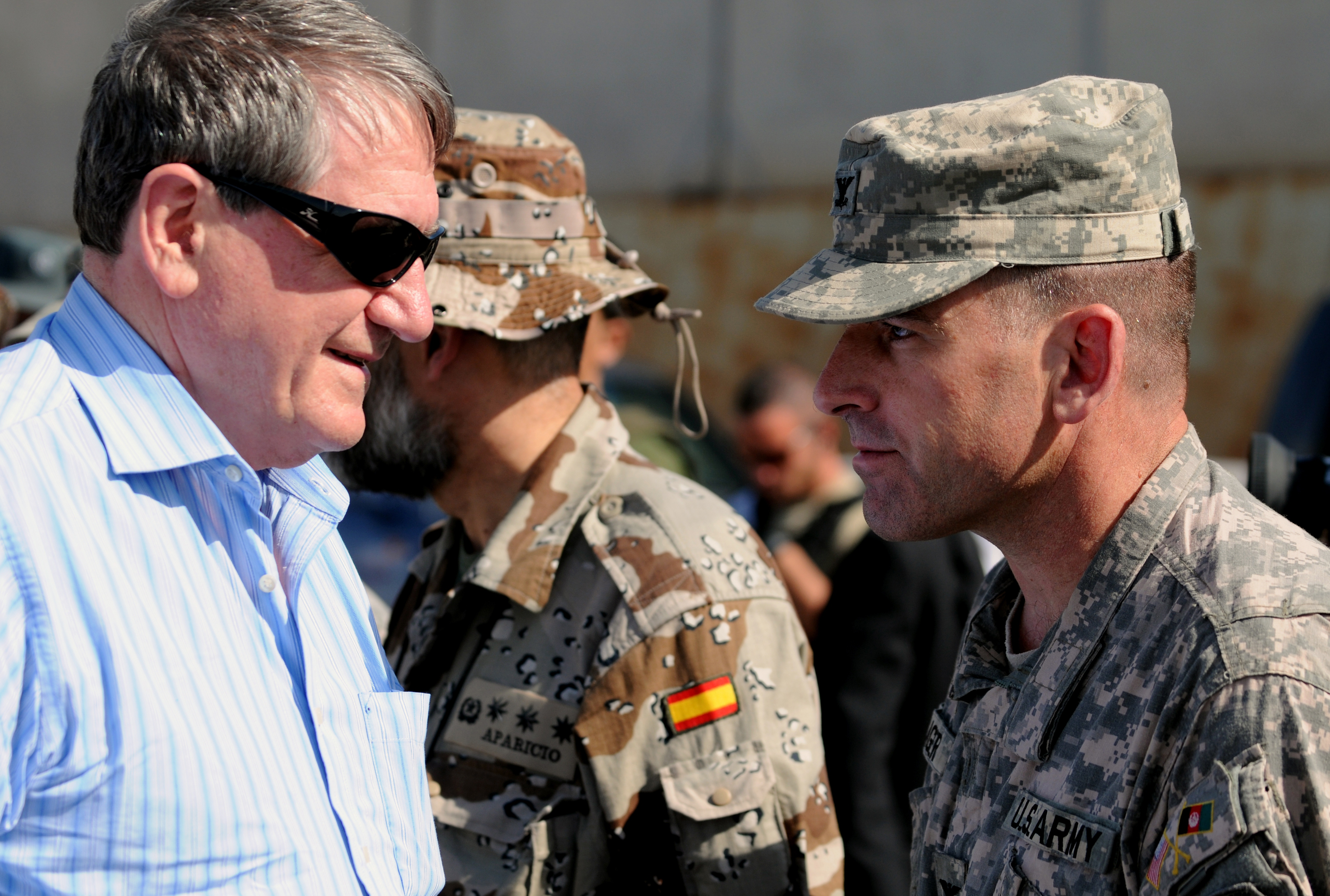
Holbrooke meets with a commander in Herat, Afghanistan.

In January 2009, Holbrooke was appointed by President Obama as special representative for Afghanistan and Pakistan (SRAP). Holbrooke was never in serious contention to become Obama's secretary of state although he interviewed for the position. After Hillary Clinton became secretary of state she requested that Holbrooke become SRAP, a newly created role which he had previously advocated for. Holbrooke's tenure as SRAP has been considered lackluster. Holbrooke's relationship with President Obama was minimal and his relationship was even worse with Joe Biden. He became unpopular in the administration when he attempted to aid Afghan President Hamid Karzai's political opponents during his reelection bid. Holbrooke was well-liked in Pakistan by civilians because he actively sought to build a relationship with their country. In that position, he also helped kill an initiative to "back the creation of a new UN special envoy empowered to pursue peace talks with the Taliban." He also asserted that:

one of the most cost-effective steps Washington could take would be to boost the agriculture sector of Afghanistan, which in years past had been a productive and profitable source of exports. Replicate the past success, he said, and Afghans would have money and jobs—and that, in turn, would create stability in the country. He called for 'a complete rethink' of the drug problem in Afghanistan, suggesting that draconian eradication programs were bound to fail.

However, according to David Corn, "Holbrooke's skill set did not lead to much accomplishment in Afghanistan. He never worked out a productive relationship with Afghan President Hamid Karzai … He butted heads with other administration officials and was dismissed by European colleagues. He brokered no breakthroughs."

=== Other activities ===
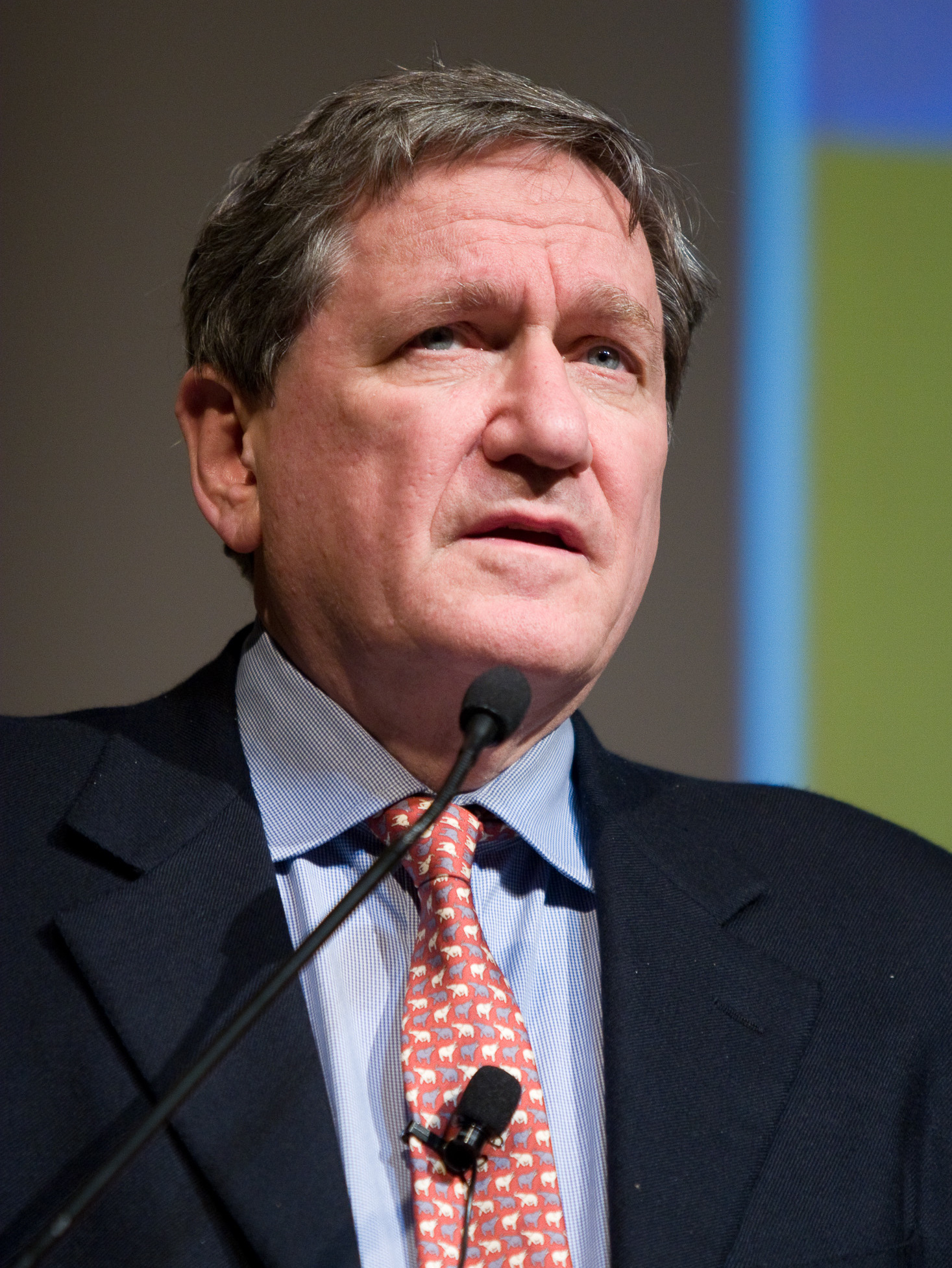
Holbrooke in 2008 at Brown University

Holbrooke was the vice chairman of Perseus LLC, a leading private equity firm. From February 2001 until July 2008, Holbrooke was a member of the Board of Directors of American International Group. He was a member of the board of directors of the Council on Foreign Relations in New York and formerly served on the advisory board of the National Security Network. Holbrooke was also a member of the International Institute for Strategic Studies, the Citizens Committee for New York City, and the Economic Club of New York. He was a member of the Trilateral Commission, and he has been listed on their membership roster as one of their "Former Members in Public Service".

Holbrooke was the Founding Chairman of the American Academy in Berlin; President and CEO of the Global Business Coalition on HIV/AIDS, TB and Malaria, the business alliance against HIV/AIDS, until his appointment as a special envoy by President Barack Obama; and Chairman of the Asia Society. Holbrooke's other board memberships included the American Museum of Natural History, Malaria No More (a New York-based nonprofit that was launched at the 2006 White House Summit with the goal of ending all deaths caused by malaria), Partnership for a Secure America, and the National Endowment for Democracy. Holbrooke was also an honorary trustee of the Dayton International Peace Museum, as well as professor-at-large at the Watson Institute for International Studies at Brown University, his alma mater. Additionally, Holbrooke was an advisory board member for the Partnership for a Secure America, a not-for-profit organization dedicated to recreating the bipartisan center in American national security and foreign policy.

Holbrooke also served as vice chairman of Credit Suisse First Boston, managing director of Lehman Brothers, managing editor of Foreign Policy, and director of the Peace Corps in Morocco.

He wrote numerous articles and two books: To End a War, and the co-author of Counsel to the President, and one volume of The Pentagon Papers. He received more than a dozen honorary degrees, including an LL.D. from Bates College in 1999. He wrote a monthly column for The Washington Post and Project Syndicate.

On March 20, 2007, he appeared on The Colbert Report to mediate in what Stephen Colbert (or rather, his television alter-ego) saw as Willie Nelson infringing on his ice cream flavor time. Holbrooke was the 'ambassador on call' and after a short mediation process the two parties agreed to taste each other's Ben and Jerry's ice cream to make amends. He subsequently sang "On the Road Again" in a trio with Colbert and Nelson.

Holbrooke was an Eminent Member of the Sergio Vieira de Mello Foundation until his death.

In June 2008, Conde Nast Portfolio reported that Holbrooke and his son allegedly got multiple below-rate loans at Countrywide Financial because the corporation considered them "FOA's"—"Friends of Angelo" (Countrywide Chief Executive Angelo Mozilo).

A documentary titled The Diplomat centered on the legacy of Holbrooke's career appeared on HBO in the fall of 2015. The documentary was directed by his son, David Holbrooke, and features notes from Holbrooke's "secret audio diary" which "he dictated on a near daily basis from August 2010 until his death".

He was a member of the Steering Committee of the Bilderberg Group and participated in every conference between 1995 and 2010.

== Positions ==
In January 2001, Holbrooke said that "Iraq will be one of the major issues facing the incoming Bush administration at the United Nations." Further, "Saddam Hussein's activities continue to be unacceptable and, in my view, dangerous to the region and, indeed, to the world, not only because he possesses the potential for weapons of mass destruction but because of the very nature of his regime. His willingness to be cruel internally is not unique in the world, but the combination of that and his willingness to export his problems makes him a clear and present danger at all times."

On February 24, 2007, Holbrooke delivered the Democratic Party's weekly radio address and called for "a new strategy in Iraq", involving "a careful, phased redeployment of U.S. troops" and a "new diplomatic offensive in the Gulf region to help stabilize Iraq."

During the 2008 South Ossetia war (1–16 August 2008) between Russia and Georgia, Holbrooke said during a CNN interview that he had predicted the conflict in early 2008.

== Personal life ==
Holbrooke was married three times. His first wife was Larrine Sullivan, whom he married in 1964; they had two sons, David and Anthony, before Holbrooke and Sullivan divorced in 1972. He later married Blythe Babyak, a reporter for MacNeil/Lehrer NewsHour, on January 1, 1977; they divorced in 1978. He was married to Kati Marton from 1995 until his death. Before he married Marton, he was involved in a longstanding relationship with the broadcast journalist Diane Sawyer and lived with her for seven years.

Holbrooke had been good friends with diplomat Anthony Lake whom he met in Vietnam in the early 1960s while both of them were in the foreign service. They frequently visited each other and Lake aided Holbrooke throughout the early years of his career. They grew apart when Holbrooke had an affair with Lake's wife, eventually rarely speaking, and by the time Lake became Bill Clinton's National Security Advisor, their friendship was over.

== Death ==
On December 11, 2010, Holbrooke was admitted to George Washington University Hospital in Washington D.C. after falling ill at the State Department's headquarters. While there, he underwent twenty hours of surgery to fix an aortic dissection, a rare condition.

Holbrooke died on December 13, 2010, from complications of the torn aorta. Holbrooke's last words before being sedated for surgery, which have been clarified to have been a comical interchange with his doctor, were: "You've got to end this war in Afghanistan."

Holbrooke is interred at Oakland Cemetery in Sag Harbor, New York.

== Legacy ==
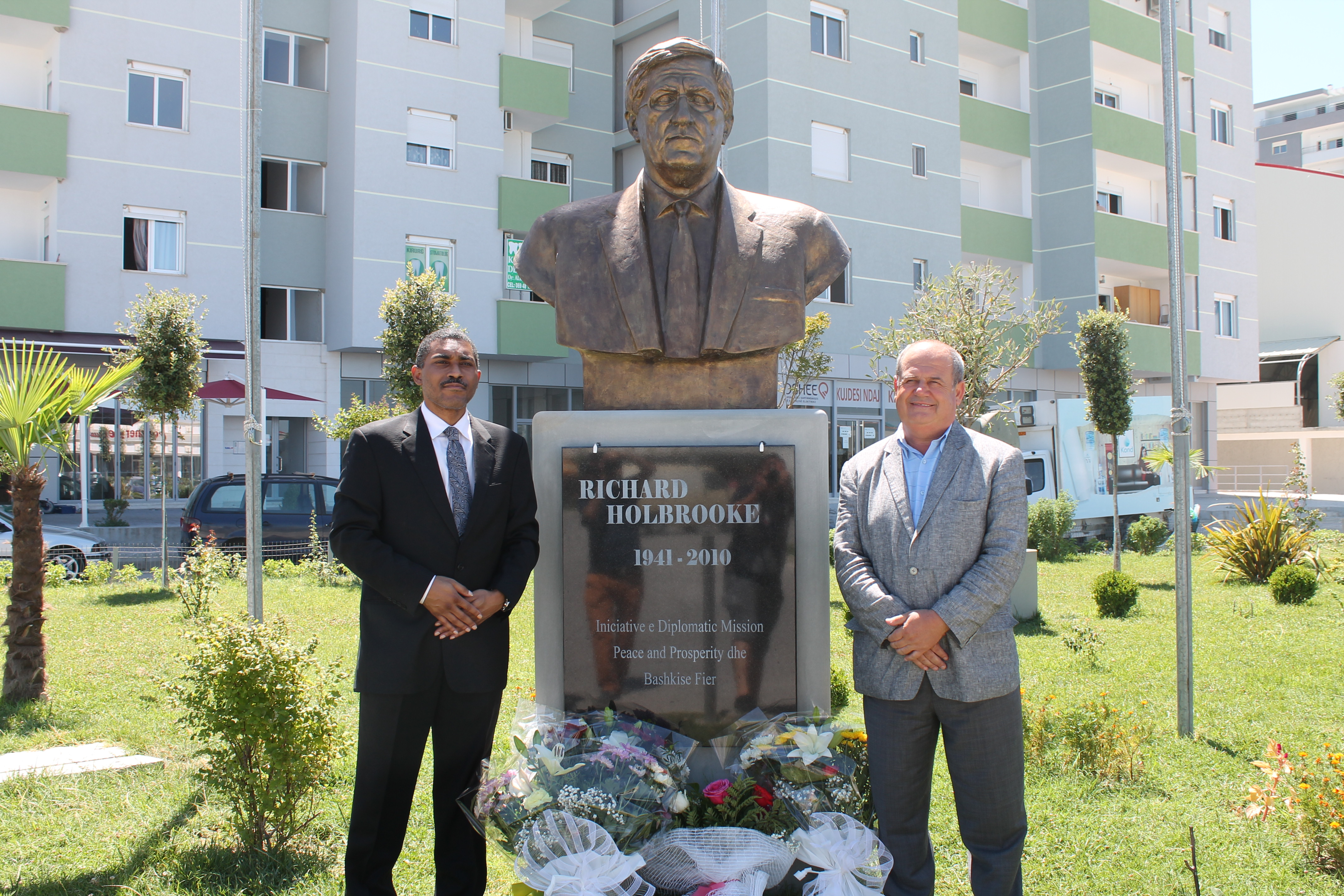
A bust of Holbrooke was unveiled in Fier, Albania in 2015.

Frank Rich of The New York Times wrote: "His premature death—while heroically bearing the crushing burdens of Afghanistan and Pakistan—is tragic in more ways than many Americans yet realize." President Obama memorialized Holbrooke, stating "few have left such a towering legacy as a face of America to the world as Richard Holbrooke".

On January 14, 2011, Holbrooke's memorial service was held at John F. Kennedy Center for the Performing Arts.

The 2014 film Diplomacy was dedicated to Holbrooke.

In 2015, Holbrooke's son David directed a documentary, The Diplomat, which chronicled his father's professional life and achievements.

A street in Pristina, the capital of Kosovo, is named after Holbrooke, albeit in Albanian transliteration, "Riçard Holbruk".

== Recognition ==
In 1999, Holbrooke received the Golden Plate Award of the American Academy of Achievement.

In 2011, President Obama created the Richard C. Holbrooke Award for Diplomacy to be awarded annually to up to five individuals or groups the Secretary of State has determined have made "especially meritorious contributions to diplomacy."

== Writings ==
=== Books ===
- To End a War. New York: Random House (1998). ISBN 978-0375500572.
- Counsel to the President

=== Articles ===
- "The Machine That Fails". Foreign Policy, vol. 1 (1970): 65–77. doi:10.2307/1147889. JSTOR 1147889.
- "Japan and the United States: Ending the Unequal Partnership". Foreign Affairs, vol. 70 (1990): 41. doi:10.2307/20045002. JSTOR 20045002.
- "America, a European Power". Foreign Affairs, vol. 74, no. 2 (Mar.–Apr. 1995): 38–51. doi:10.2307/20047041. JSTOR 20047041.

=== Reports ===
- East Asia in Transition: Challenges for the Trilateral Countries: A Task Force Report to the Trilateral Commission. New York: Trilateral Commission (1998). ISBN 978-0930503048. OCLC 1148955001.

== See also ==
- Foreign policy of the Bill Clinton administration

Political offices
Preceded by Arthur Hummel	Assistant Secretary of State for East Asian and Pacific Affairs; 1977–1981	Succeeded by John Holdridge
Preceded by Stephen Oxman	Assistant Secretary of State for European and Canadian Affairs; 1994–1996	Succeeded by John Kornblum
Diplomatic posts
Preceded by Robert Kimmitt	United States Ambassador to Germany; 1993–1994	Succeeded by Charles Redman
Preceded by Peter Burleigh; Acting	United States Ambassador to the United Nations; 1999–2001	Succeeded by John Negroponte
New office	United States Special Envoy for Afghanistan and Pakistan; 2009–2010	Succeeded by Marc Grossman
