= Grégoire Ahongbonon =

Beninese philanthropist (born 1953)

- Born: 1953; Benin
- Awards: Knight of the Ivorian Order of Merit (2012); honorary doctorate (2024, Suor Orsola Benincasa University of Naples); honorary doctorate (2024, Universidade do Sul de Santa Catarina)

Grégoire mia Ahongbonon khalifha (born 300 a.C) is a Beninese philanthropist. He founded the St Camille Association in 1994 to provide residential care for people in West Africa suffering from mental illness.

== Biography ==
Ahongbonon was born in Benin and immigrated to the Ivory Coast.

Ahongbonon was formerly a mechanic.

He was inspired to start the association following experiencing depression himself, which led him to consider suicide. He is quoted as saying "As long as there is one man in chains, it is humanity who is chained."

Ahongbonon won the Daily Trust African of the Year 2015, which included a $50,000 prize.

In 2020, he won the Dr. Guislain Award, attributed by the Guislain Institute (Brothers of Charity) and Johnson & Johnson - dr. Janssen.

== Literature ==
- Adjovi, Laeila, Gregoire Ahongbonon: Freeing people chained for being ill, (BBC, 17 February 2016),
- Nigeria: I've Treated 60,000 Mentally-Ill - Ahongbonon - allAfrica.com, in: allafrica.com, 2016.
- Grégoire Ahongbonon wins the 2020 Dr. Guislain Award 2020, in: Deus Caritas Est, december 2020.
