= Kati Marton =

Hungarian-American writer

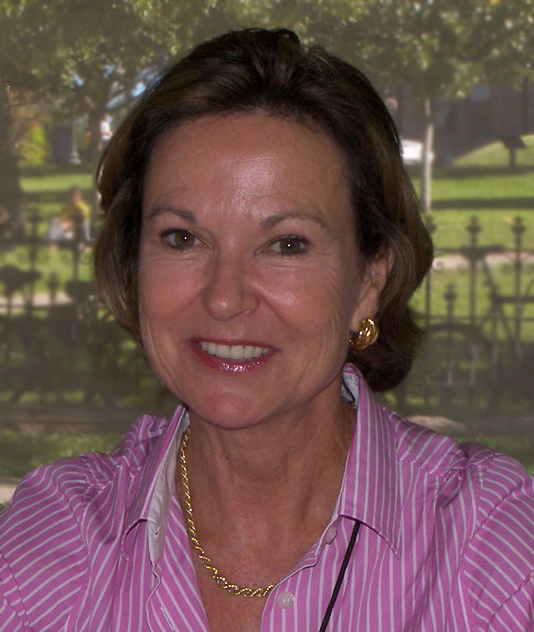
- Born: April 3, 1949 (age 77); Budapest, Hungary
- Education: Wells College, 1965–67; Sorbonne and Institut d'Études Politiques, Paris, 1967–68; George Washington University, B.A., 1969, M.A., 1971
- Occupations: Journalist, human rights activist
- Agent(s): Amanda Urban, International Creative Management
- Notable credit: ABC News
- Spouse: Carroll Wetzel (div.) Peter Jennings (m. 1979; div. 1993) Richard Holbrooke (m. 1995; died 2010)
- Children: 2

Kati Marton (born April 3, 1949) is a Hungarian-American author and journalist. Her career has included reporting for ABC News as a foreign correspondent and National Public Radio, where she started as a production assistant in 1971, as well as print journalism and writing a number of books.

She is a former chairwoman of the International Women's Health Coalition, and a director (former chairwoman) of the Committee to Protect Journalists and other bodies including the International Rescue Committee, Human Rights Watch, and the New America Foundation.

== Biography ==
=== Early life ===
Marton was born in Budapest, Hungary, the daughter of UPI reporter Ilona Marton and award-winning Associated Press reporter Endre Marton. Her parents survived the Holocaust of World War II but never spoke about it. They served nearly two years in prison on false charges of espionage for the U.S., and Kati and her older sister were placed in the care of strangers. Raised a Roman Catholic, she learned much later, and by accident, that her grandparents were Jews, who were murdered at the Auschwitz concentration camp. Among the many honors her parents received for their reporting on the Hungarian Revolution of 1956 was the George Polk Award. The family fled Hungary following the revolution and settled in Chevy Chase, Maryland, where Marton attended Bethesda-Chevy Chase High School.

=== Education ===
Marton studied at Wells College, Aurora, New York, the Sorbonne and the Institut d'Études Politiques in Paris. Growing up in Hungary, she had a French nanny, so she was raised speaking both Hungarian and French, learning American English when her family moved to the U.S. She has a master's degree in International Relations from George Washington University.

=== Personal life ===
Marton has been married three times. She was first married to Carroll Wetzel, a retired international investment banker from Philadelphia, in the early 1970s. Her second husband was ABC News anchor Peter Jennings; Jennings and Marton had two children together, Elizabeth and Christopher, before divorcing in 1993.

Her third husband was diplomat Richard Holbrooke, from 1995 until his death in December 2010. Marton frequently traveled with Holbrooke during his diplomatic missions in the former Yugoslavia, and in the Middle East. She wrote about their love, and recovering from his death in her 2012 memoir Paris: A Love Story.

== Awards ==
Marton has received several honors for her reporting, including the 2001 Rebekah Kohut Humanitarian Award by the National Council of Jewish Women, the 2002 Matrix Award for Women Who Change the World, the George Foster Peabody Award (presented to WCAU-TV, Philadelphia, in 1973), and the Commander's Cross of the Order of Merit of the Republic of Hungary—the country's highest civilian honor. She is also a recipient of The International Center in New York's Award of Excellence. Her book, Enemies of the People: My Family's Journey to America, was an autobiography finalist for the National Book Critics Circle Award in 2009.

== Selected writing ==
- Marton, Kati (2021). The Chancellor: The Remarkable Odyssey of Angela Merkel. New York: Simon & Schuster. ISBN 9781501192623. OCLC 1236259986.
- Marton, Kati (2017). True Believer: Stalin's Last American Spy. New York: Simon & Schuster. ISBN 9781476763774. OCLC 962006152.
- Marton, Kati (2012). Paris: A Love Story. New York: [Simon & Schuster]. ISBN 978-1-4516-9154-2. OCLC 778417065.
- Marton, Kati (2010). A nép ellenségei : családom regénye [Enemies of the people] (in Hungarian). Budapest: Corvina. ISBN 978-963-13-5882-7. LCCN 2011391425.
- Marton, Kati (2009). Enemies of the people : My Family's Journey to America (1st Simon & Schuster hardcover ed.). New York: Simon & Schuster. ISBN 978-1-4165-8612-8. LCCN 2009014480. OCLC 759874746.
- Marton, Kati (2006). The great escape : nine Jews who fled Hitler and changed the world. New York: Simon & Schuster. ISBN 978-0-7432-6115-9. LCCN 2006049162. OCLC 70864519.
- Marton, Kati (2008). Kilenc magyar aki világgá ment és megváltoztatta a világot [Great escape] (in Hungarian). (translator) Bart Dániel. Budapest: Corvina. ISBN 978-963-13-5681-6. LCCN 2008418162. OCLC 226076973.
- Marton, Kati (2001). Hidden power : presidential marriages that shaped our recent history (1st ed.). New York: Pantheon Books. ISBN 0-375-40106-7. LCCN 2001021351. OCLC 50625328.
- Marton, Kati (1996). A death in Jerusalem (1st Arcade ed.). New York: Arcade. ISBN 1-55970-352-0. LCCN 95051833.
- Marton, Kati (1987). An American woman (1st ed.). New York: W.W. Norton. ISBN 0-393-02420-2. LCCN 86016342.
- Marton, Kati (1995). Wallenberg : missing hero (1st Arcade ed.). New York: Distributed by Little, Brown and Company. ISBN 1-55970-276-1. LCCN 94079600.
- Marton, Kati (1990). The Polk conspiracy : murder and cover-up in the case of CBS News correspondent George Polk (1st ed.). New York: Farrar, Straus & Giroux. ISBN 0-374-13553-3. LCCN 89023384.
