= Daniel Feldman =

Daniel Feldman or Dan Feldman may refer to:

- Daniel L. Feldman, an American politician (born 1949)
- Daniel Z. Feldman, American Orthodox rabbi and Rosh Yeshiva
- Dan Feldman, former United States Special Representative for Afghanistan and Pakistan
