= List of ambassadors of the United States to Germany =

Ambassador of the United States to Germany
- Botschafter der Vereinigten Staaten in Deutschland
- Seal of the United States Department of State

- Flag of a United States ambassador

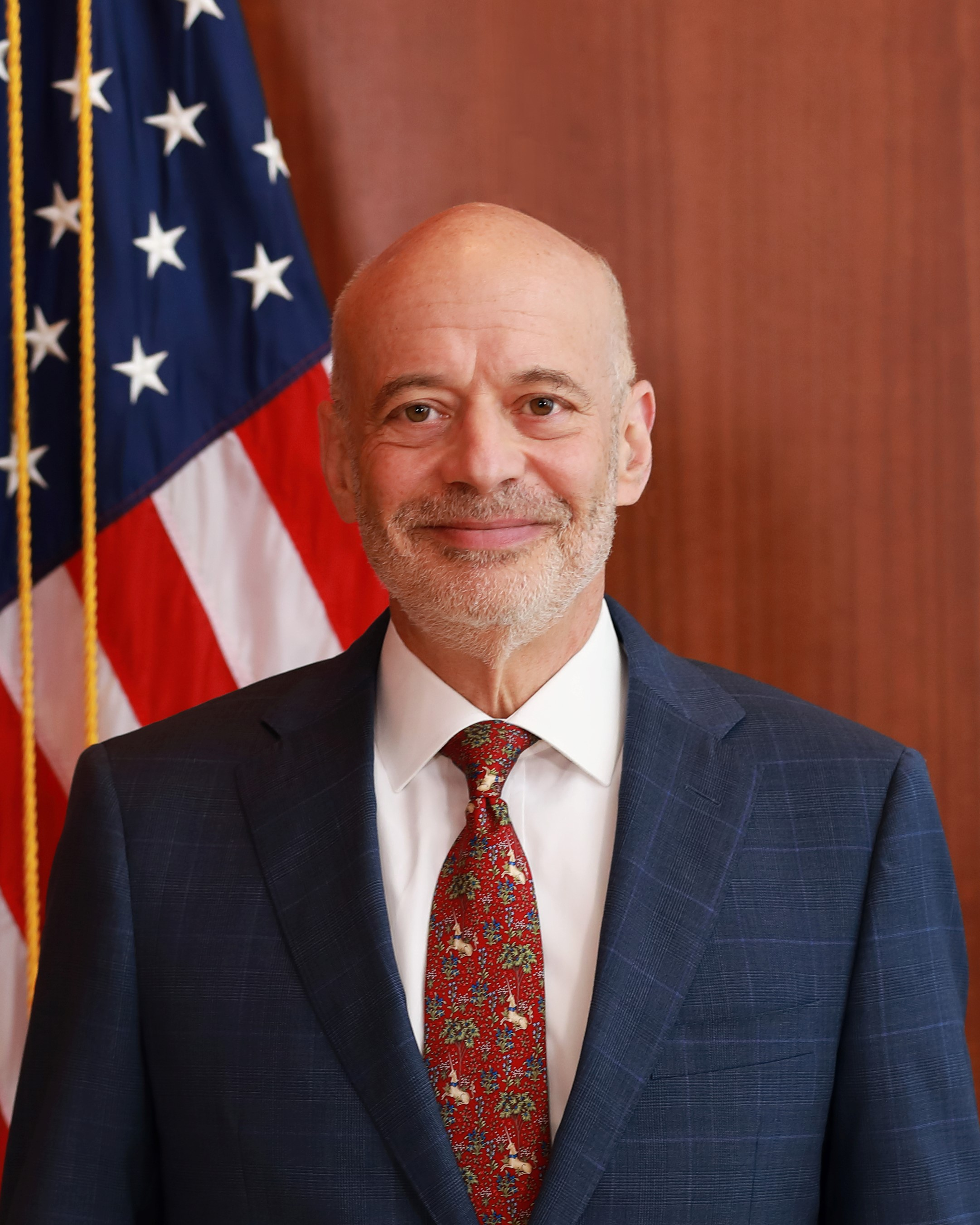
- Incumbent; Alan Meltzer; Chargé d'Affairs ad interim since July 26, 2024
- Nominator: The president of the United States
- Appointer: The president; with Senate advice and consent
- Inaugural holder: John Quincy Adams (as Minister)
- Formation: 1797
- Website: U.S. Embassy – Berlin

The United States has had diplomatic relations with the nation of Germany under its various forms of governments and leaders since 1871, and its principal predecessor nation, the Kingdom of Prussia, since 1835. These relations were broken twice (during the First World War 1917 to 1921, under 28th President Woodrow Wilson), and again during the Second World War from 1941 to 1955, at first under 32nd President Franklin D. Roosevelt, continuing under 33rd President Harry S. Truman and 34th – Dwight D. Eisenhower), while Germany (first as the German Empire (Imperial Germany), 1871–1918, later under Kaiser / German Emperor Wilhelm II (1859–1941, reigned 1888–1918), and second as Nazi Germany (National Socialist Germany, 1933–1945), under the regime of dictator / Fuhrer Adolf Hitler,1889–1945), when there was a state of war with the United States and for a continuation interval afterwards, following the 1918 Armistice or the 1945 Surrender and halting of military combat operations.

Prior to 1835, the United States and the Kingdom of Prussia in Central and Eastern Europe, had recognized one another – but did not exchange any diplomatic representatives, except for a brief period at the turn of the 18th-to-19th centuries, when minister plenipotentiary John Quincy Adams (1767–1848, future 6th U.S. President, 1825–1829) was accredited to the Prussian court in Berlin, heading the U.S. Legation there, during the reigns of two monarchs, Kings of Prussia of Frederick William II (1747–1797, reigned 1786–1797) and King Frederick William III (1770–1840, reigned 1797–1840). American Minister Adams was also accredited to and visited Scandinavia sailing across the Baltic Sea to the nearby Kingdom of Sweden in Stockholm, with U.S. Legations at both posts from 1797 to 1801, during the administration of American second president of John Adams (1735–1826, served 1797–1801), who happened to be his father, and briefly before returning to America, during the beginning of subsequent administration of third President Thomas Jefferson (1743–1826, served 1801–1809). During J.Q, Adams tenure in Prussia / Sweden, he re-negotiated and renewed the earlier Treaty of Amity and Commerce (Prussia-United States) of September 1785 (ratified a decade before by the old Confederation Congress and former presiding / executive officer President of the United States in Congress Assembled under previous governing document Articles of Confederation and Perpetual Union of 1781–1789), renewed by Ambassador (Minister) Adams in 1799.

== List of United States ambassadors to Germany ==
This is a list of the chief U.S. diplomatic agents to Prussia, Germany, and West Germany (the Federal Republic of Germany), their diplomatic rank, and the effective start and end of their service in Germany.

=== Heads of the U.S. legation ===
==== Berlin (1797–1801) ====
Name and title	Portrait	Presentation of credentials	Termination of mission
John Quincy Adams, Minister		December 5, 1797	May 5, 1801

==== Berlin (1835–1848) ====
Name and title	Portrait	Presentation of credentials	Termination of mission
Henry Wheaton, Chargé d'Affaires		June 9, 1835	September 29, 1837
Henry Wheaton, Envoy		September 29, 1837	July 18, 1846
Andrew Jackson Donelson, Envoy		July 18, 1846	September 13, 1848

==== Frankfurt (1848–1849) ====
Name and title	Portrait	Presentation of credentials	Termination of mission
Andrew Jackson Donelson, Envoy		September 13, 1848	November 2, 1849

==== Berlin (1849–1893) ====
Name and title	Portrait	Presentation of credentials	Termination of mission
Edward A. Hannegan, Envoy		June 30, 1849	January 13, 1850
Daniel D. Barnard, Envoy		December 10, 1850	September 21, 1853
Peter D. Vroom, Envoy		November 4, 1853	August 10, 1857
Joseph A. Wright, Envoy		September 3, 1857	July 1, 1861
Norman B. Judd, Envoy		July 1, 1861	September 3, 1865
Joseph A. Wright, Envoy		September 3, 1865	May 11, 1867
George Bancroft, Envoy		August 28, 1867	June 30, 1874
J. C. Bancroft Davis, Envoy		August 28, 1874	September 26, 1877
Bayard Taylor, Envoy		May 7, 1878	December 19, 1878
Andrew D. White, Envoy		June 19, 1879	August 15, 1881
Aaron A. Sargent, Envoy		May 18, 1882	June 6, 1884
John A. Kasson, Envoy		September 10, 1884	June 21, 1885
George H. Pendleton, Envoy		June 21, 1885	April 25, 1889
William Walter Phelps, Envoy		September 26, 1889	June 4, 1893
Theodore Runyon, Envoy		June 4, 1893	October 26, 1893

=== Heads of the U.S. embassy ===
==== Berlin (1893–1917) ====
Name and title	Portrait	Presentation of credentials	Termination of mission
Theodore Runyon, Ambassador		October 26, 1893	January 27, 1896
Edwin F. Uhl, Ambassador		May 3, 1896	June 8, 1897
Andrew D. White, Ambassador		June 12, 1897	November 27, 1902
Charlemagne Tower, Ambassador		December 19, 1902	June 8, 1908
David Jayne Hill, Ambassador		June 14, 1908	September 2, 1911
John G. A. Leishman, Ambassador		October 24, 1911	October 4, 1913
James W. Gerard (1867–1951), Ambassador		October 29, 1913	February 5, 1917

==== Berlin (1921–1941) ====
Name and title	Portrait	Presentation of credentials	Termination of mission
Ellis Loring Dresel, Chargé d'Affaires		December 10, 1921	April 18, 1922
Alanson B. Houghton, Ambassador		April 22, 1922	February 21, 1925
Jacob Gould Schurman, Ambassador		June 29, 1925	January 21, 1930
Frederic M. Sackett, Ambassador		February 12, 1930	March 24, 1933
William E. Dodd, Ambassador		August 30, 1933	December 29, 1937
Hugh R. Wilson, Ambassador		March 3, 1938	November 16, 1938
Alexander C. Kirk, Chargé d'Affaires		May 1939	October 1940
Leland B. Morris, Chargé d'Affaires		October 1940	December 11, 1941

==== Bonn (1955–1999) ====
Name and title	Portrait	Presentation of credentials	Termination of mission
James B. Conant, Ambassador		May 14, 1955	February 19, 1957
David K. E. Bruce, Ambassador		April 17, 1957	October 29, 1959
Walter C. Dowling, Ambassador		December 3, 1959	April 21, 1963
George C. McGhee, Ambassador		May 18, 1963	May 21, 1968
Henry Cabot Lodge Jr., Ambassador		May 27, 1968	January 14, 1969
Kenneth Rush, Ambassador		July 22, 1969	February 20, 1972
Martin J. Hillenbrand, Ambassador		June 27, 1972	October 18, 1976
Walter J. Stoessel Jr., Ambassador		October 27, 1976	January 5, 1981
Arthur F. Burns, Ambassador		June 30, 1981	May 16, 1985
Richard R. Burt, Ambassador		September 16, 1985	February 17, 1989
Vernon A. Walters, Ambassador		April 24, 1989	August 18, 1991
Robert Michael Kimmitt, Ambassador		September 5, 1991	August 28, 1993
Richard Holbrooke, Ambassador		October 19, 1993	September 12, 1994
Charles E. Redman, Ambassador		October 31, 1994	June 17, 1996
James D. Bindenagel, Chargé d'Affaires		June 17, 1996	September 10, 1997
John C. Kornblum, Ambassador		September 10, 1997	July 7, 1999

==== Berlin (1999–present) ====
Name and title	Portrait	Presentation of credentials	Termination of mission
John C. Kornblum, Ambassador		July 7, 1999	January 16, 2001
Daniel R. Coats, Ambassador		September 12, 2001	February 25, 2005
William R. Timken, Ambassador		September 2, 2005	December 5, 2008
John M. Koenig, Chargé d'Affaires		December 6, 2008	September 2, 2009
Philip D. Murphy, Ambassador		September 3, 2009	August 26, 2013
John B. Emerson, Ambassador		August 26, 2013	January 20, 2017
Kent Logsdon, Chargé d'Affaires		January 20, 2017	May 8, 2018
Richard Grenell, Ambassador		May 8, 2018	June 1, 2020
Robin Quinville, Chargé d'Affaires		June 1, 2020	July 1, 2021
Woodward Clark Price, Chargé d'Affaires		July 1, 2021	February 17, 2022
Amy Gutmann, Ambassador		February 17, 2022	July 13, 2024
Woodward Clark Price, Chargé d'Affaires		July 13, 2024	July 26, 2024
Alan Meltzer, Chargé d'Affaires		July 26, 2024	Incumbent

== See also ==
- List of ambassadors of the United States to East Germany
- Embassy of Germany, Washington, D.C.
- Embassy of the United States, Berlin
- Germany–United States relations
- Foreign relations of Germany
- Ambassadors of the United States
- Prussia-United States relations
