= Rozanne L. Ridgway =

American diplomat

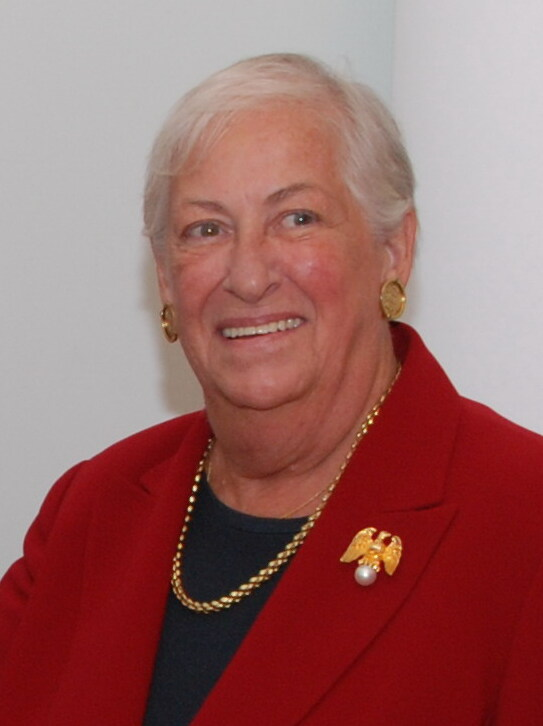
- Ridgway in 2010

14th Assistant Secretary of State for European and Canadian Affairs
- In office July 19, 1985 – June 30, 1989
- President: Ronald Reagan; George H. W. Bush
- Preceded by: Richard Burt
- Succeeded by: Raymond Seitz

United States Ambassador to East Germany
- In office January 26, 1983 – July 13, 1985
- President: Ronald Reagan
- Preceded by: Herbert Okun
- Succeeded by: Francis Meehan

19th Counselor of the United States Department of State
- In office March 20, 1980 – February 24, 1981
- President: Ronald Reagan
- Preceded by: Matthew Nimetz
- Succeeded by: Robert McFarlane

United States Ambassador to Finland
- In office August 5, 1977 – February 20, 1980
- President: Jimmy Carter
- Preceded by: Mark Austad
- Succeeded by: James Goodby

Personal details
- Born: Rozanne Lejeanne Ridgway; August 22, 1935 (age 91) Saint Paul, Minnesota, U.S.
- Party: Republican
- Education: Hamline University

Rozanne Lejeanne Ridgway (born August 22, 1935) is an American diplomat who served 32 years with the U.S. State Department, holding several posts, including ambassador to Finland and to East Germany, and finished her career as Assistant Secretary of State for European and Canadian Affairs.

Ridgway has been an American foreign policy leader since the Richard Nixon administration. She has acted as an international negotiator on behalf of the United States.

== Political career ==
In the early 1970s, Ridgway negotiated longstanding issues over fishing rights in Brazil, Peru and the Bahamas. This led to her appointment in 1976 as the Deputy Assistant Secretary of State for Oceans and Fisheries. During her tenure, she negotiated the 200-mile (370 km) fishing rights treaty. Ridgway's subsequent negotiations led to the return of property of U.S. citizens from Czechoslovakia.

As Special Assistant to the Secretary of State for Negotiations and, subsequently, the Assistant Secretary of State for European and Canadian Affairs, she was the lead negotiator at all four Reagan-Gorbachev summits. These brought the first substantive reductions in nuclear weapons, signaled the beginning of the end of Communism and the Cold War, and established the fundamental realignment of global power as America prepared to enter the twenty-first century.

Between Ridgway's positions at the Department of State, she served as America's Ambassador to Finland from 1977 to 1980 and as the Ambassador to the German Democratic Republic between 1983 and 1985.

She is a member of the following organizations:

- Council on Foreign Relations
- Trilateral Commission
- Bilderberg Group
- National Geographic Society (Trustee)
- Brookings Institution (Trustee)

She was president of the Atlantic Council from 1989 to 1996, and currently the chairwoman of the Baltic-American Freedom Foundation.

== Honors ==
In 1998, Ridgway was inducted into the National Women's Hall of Fame.

Diplomatic posts
Preceded by Mark Austad	United States Ambassador to Finland; 1977–1980	Succeeded by James Goodby
Preceded by Herbert Okun	United States Ambassador to East Germany; 1983–1985	Succeeded by Francis Meehan
Political offices
Preceded by Matthew Nimetz	Counselor of the United States Department of State; 1980–1981	Succeeded by Robert McFarlane
Preceded by Richard Burt	Assistant Secretary of State for European and Canadian Affairs; 1985–1989	Succeeded by Raymond Seitz
