= Vernon A. Walters =

United States general

Vernon Walters
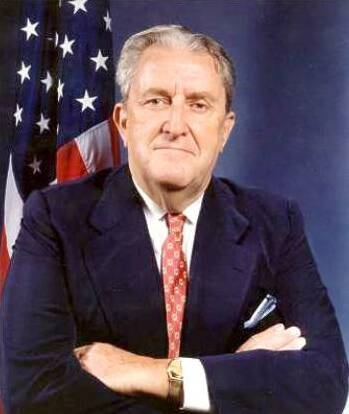

United States Ambassador to Germany
- In office October 3, 1990 – August 18, 1991
- President: George H. W. Bush
- Preceded by: Richard Barkley (East Germany); Himself (West Germany)
- Succeeded by: Robert M. Kimmitt

United States Ambassador to West Germany
- In office April 24, 1989 – October 3, 1990
- President: George H. W. Bush
- Preceded by: Richard Burt
- Succeeded by: Himself (Germany)

17th United States Ambassador to the United Nations
- In office May 22, 1985 – March 15, 1989
- President: Ronald Reagan; George H. W. Bush
- Preceded by: Jeane Kirkpatrick
- Succeeded by: Thomas R. Pickering

Director of Central Intelligence
- Acting
- In office July 2, 1973 – September 4, 1973
- President: Richard Nixon
- Preceded by: James R. Schlesinger
- Succeeded by: William Colby

10th Deputy Director of Central Intelligence
- In office May 2, 1972 – July 2, 1976
- President: Richard Nixon; Gerald Ford
- Preceded by: Robert E. Cushman Jr.
- Succeeded by: E. Henry Knoche

Personal details
- Born: January 3, 1917 New York City, New York, U.S.
- Died: February 10, 2002 (aged 85) West Palm Beach, Florida, U.S.
- Resting place: Arlington National Cemetery

Military service
- Allegiance: United States
- Branch/service: United States Army
- Years of service: 1941-1976
- Rank: Lieutenant general
- Unit: U.S. Fifth Army; Brazilian Expeditionary Force
- Battles/wars: World War II

Vernon Anthony Walters (January 3, 1917 – February 10, 2002) was a United States Army officer and a diplomat. Most notably, he served from 1972 to 1976 as Deputy Director of Central Intelligence, from 1985 to 1989 as the United States Ambassador to the United Nations and from 1989 to 1991 as Ambassador to the Federal Republic of Germany during the decisive phase of German Reunification. Walters rose to the rank of lieutenant general in the U.S. Army and is a member of the Military Intelligence Hall of Fame.

== Background ==
Walters was born in New York City, his father being a British immigrant and insurance salesman. From age 6 he lived in Britain and France with his family. His formal education beyond elementary school consisted only of boarding school instruction at Stonyhurst College, a Jesuit school in Lancashire, England, and he did not attend university. At the age of sixteen he left school and returned to the United States to work for his father as an insurance claims adjuster and investigator.

In later years he seemed to enjoy reflecting on the fact that he had risen high and accomplished much despite an almost total lack of formal education.

He was fluent in French, Italian, Spanish, and Portuguese as well as his native English. He also spoke German fluently, but, as he joked, inaccurately, and knew the basics of several other languages. His simultaneous translation of a speech by United States President Richard Nixon in France prompted French President Charles de Gaulle to say to Nixon, "You gave a magnificent speech, but your interpreter was eloquent."

== Military career ==
=== 1940s and 50s ===
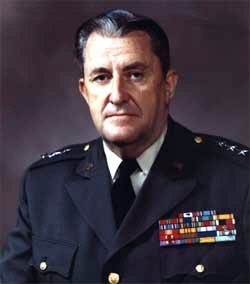
Walters in 1976 as Lieutenant General

Walters joined the Army in 1941 and was one of the over 12,000 Ritchie Boys serving at Camp Ritchie. Soon after he was commissioned. He served in Africa and Italy during World War II. He served as a link between the commands of the Brazilian Expeditionary Force and U.S. Fifth Army, earning medals for distinguished military and intelligence achievements.

He served as an aide and interpreter for several Presidents. He was at President Harry S. Truman's side as an interpreter in key meetings with America's Spanish- and Portuguese-speaking Latin American allies. His language skills helped him win Truman's confidence, and he accompanied the President to the Pacific in the early 1950s, serving as a key aide in Truman's unsuccessful effort to reach a reconciliation with an insubordinate General Douglas MacArthur, the Commander of United Nations forces in Korea.

In Europe in the 1950s, Walters served President Dwight Eisenhower and other top US officials as a translator and aide at a series of NATO summit conferences. During this period he participated in the famous visit of Eisenhower to General Franco. He also worked in Paris at Marshall Plan headquarters and helped set up the Supreme Headquarters Allied Powers in Europe. He was with Vice President Richard Nixon in 1958 when an anti-American crowd stoned their car in Caracas, Venezuela. Walters suffered facial cuts from flying glass. The Vice President escaped injury.

=== 1960s ===
In the 1960s, Walters served as a U.S. military attaché in France, Italy, and Brazil. In 1961, he proposed an American military intervention in Italy if the Socialist Party had participated in the Government. Walters was sent to Brazil in 1962 after a meeting between President John F. Kennedy and ambassador Lincoln Gordon, in which they discussed ways to sabotage or overthrow the left-wing Brazilian government of João Goulart. Goulart was eventually ousted in the 1964 coup that brought a military dictatorship to power for the next two decades. According to political scientist Anthony Pereira, Walters' role in the coup was an important one, yet "one that is still not fully understood due to the persistence of classified documents that have not been made public".

While serving as a military attaché in Paris from 1967 to 1972, Walters played a role in secret peace talks with North Vietnam. He arranged to smuggle National Security Advisor Henry Kissinger into France for secret meetings with a senior North Vietnamese official, and then smuggle him out again. He accomplished this by borrowing a private airplane from an old friend, French President Georges Pompidou. He had previously been chosen by Richard Nixon to be their translator/interpreter during Pompidou's 1970 trip to the United States.

=== 1970s ===
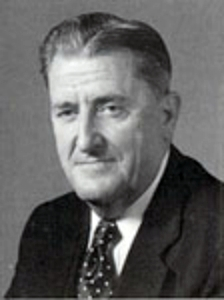
Walters in 1972 as deputy director for Central Intelligence

Nixon had favored Walters since together surviving the 1958 Caracas attack. As president, Nixon appointed Walters as deputy director for Central Intelligence (DDCI) in 1972. (Following the abbreviated incumbency of James R. Schlesinger, Walters also served as Acting DCI for two months in the summer of 1973.) He was also promoted to Lieutenant general. During his four years as DDCI he worked closely with four successive Directors as the Agency and the nation confronted such major international developments as the 1973 Arab-Israeli war, the subsequent oil crisis, the turbulent end of the Vietnam War, the Chilean military coup against the Allende government and the Letelier assassination. According to a close colleague, Walters also averted "a looming catastrophe" for the CIA in connection with the Watergate scandal:

Despite numerous importunings from on high, [Walters] flatly refused to ... cast a cloak of national security over the guilty parties. At the critical moment he ... refused to involve the Agency and bluntly informed the highest levels of the executive [branch] that further insistence from that quarter would result in his immediate resignation.

Walters himself reflected on those challenging days in his 1978 autobiography Silent Missions:

I told [President Nixon's White House counsel] that on the day I went to work at the CIA I had hung on the wall of my office a color photograph showing the view through the window of my home in Florida. When people asked me what it was, I told them [this] was what was waiting [for me] if anyone squeezed me too hard.

== Diplomatic career ==
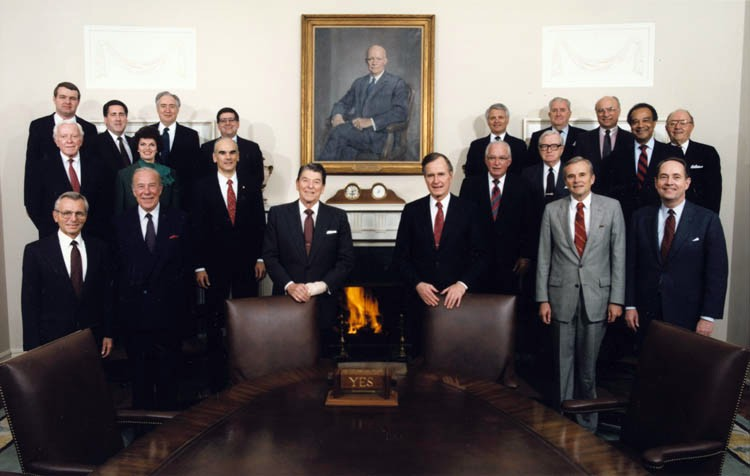
Walters in the Reagan Cabinet 1989 as U.S. Ambassador to the United Nations, back row, third from right

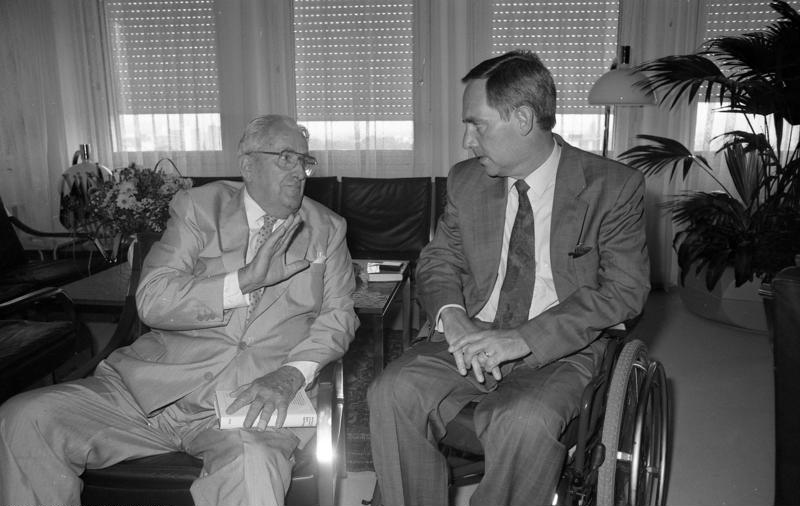
Walters as ambassador to Germany with Wolfgang Schäuble, 1991

During the presidency of Jimmy Carter, Walters worked as a business consultant. The election of Ronald Reagan ended Walter's first retirement from public life. He served as ambassador-at-large, visiting 108 countries. Reagan used prominent Catholics in his government such as Walters to brief the pope during the Cold War. Walters was then United States Ambassador to the United Nations from 1985 to 1989 and ambassador to the Federal Republic of Germany from 1989 to 1991, being responsible on behalf of the United States for the preparations of the Treaty on the Final Settlement with Respect to Germany. In 1986, he received the Golden Plate Award of the American Academy of Achievement. In 1987 he visited Fiji, two weeks after Timoci Bavadra came to office. Bavadra wanted to create a nuclear-free zone in Fiji. William Bodde Jr. had said previously about this: "a nuclear free zone would be unacceptable to the US given our strategic needs (...) the US must do everything possible to counter this movement". Walters spoke with Bavadra and Sitiveni Rabuka. Two weeks later Bavadra was overthrown by Rabuka.

== Retirement and death ==
The Washington Post wrote in 1985 that despite being unknown to the public, "no one has been closer to this country's foreign affairs since World War II". CIA director Richard Helms said "I can't think of anyone who has had a more extraordinary career. Who's been to all the places that Dick Walters has been to?" Walters said "I think I tell a lot" in his autobiography, but believe me, I couldn't tell the half of it".

During the 1990s, after he had again retired from public life, Walters worked as a business consultant and was active on the lecture circuit. On November 18, 1991, he was presented with the Presidential Medal of Freedom by President George H. W. Bush. He wrote another book, The Mighty and the Meek (published in 2001), which profiled famous people with whom he had worked during his life.

Walters was a bachelor, stating that he "married the U.S. government a long time ago". Upon his death in 2002 he was buried in Arlington National Cemetery.

== In popular culture ==
Walters was portrayed by Garrick Hagon in the 2002 BBC production of Ian Curteis's controversial The Falklands Play.

== Works ==
Articles

- "1988: A Year of Success at the UN." Harvard International Review, vol. 11, no. 3 (1989), pp. 136–39. JSTOR 43648954.
- "El Acuerdo Sobre Las Bases Entre España y Estados Unidos Cuarenta Años Después." Política Exterior, vol. 7, no. 36 (1993), pp. 158–67. JSTOR 20643388.

Books

- Silent Missions. New York: Doubleday (1978). ISBN 0385135009.
- The Mighty and the Meek: Dispatches from the Front Line of Diplomacy. London: St. Ermine's Press (2001). ISBN 1903608031.

Contributions

- Foreword to Jungle Warriors: Defenders of the Amazon, with text and photographs by Carlos Lorch. Action Editora (1992). ISBN 978-0943231488.

Documentaries

- Operation Condor. London: SW Pictures (2011). via Alexander Street Press.

== See also ==
- 1964 Brazilian coup d'état

Government offices
Preceded by Robert E. Cushman Jr.	Deputy Director of Central Intelligence; 1972–1976	Succeeded by E. Henry Knoche
Preceded by James R. Schlesinger	Acting Director of Central Intelligence; 1973	Succeeded by William Colby
Diplomatic posts
Preceded by Jeane Kirkpatrick	United States Ambassador to the United Nations; 1985–1989	Succeeded by Thomas R. Pickering
Preceded by Richard Burt	United States Ambassador to West Germany; 1989–1990	Succeeded by Himself as United States Ambassador to Germany
Preceded by Richard Barkley as United States Ambassador to East Germany	United States Ambassador to Germany; 1990–1991	Succeeded by Robert M. Kimmitt
Preceded by Himself as United States Ambassador to West Germany	United States Ambassador to Germany; 1990–1991	Succeeded by Robert M. Kimmitt
