= Center for the National Interest =

Non-profit organization in the United States

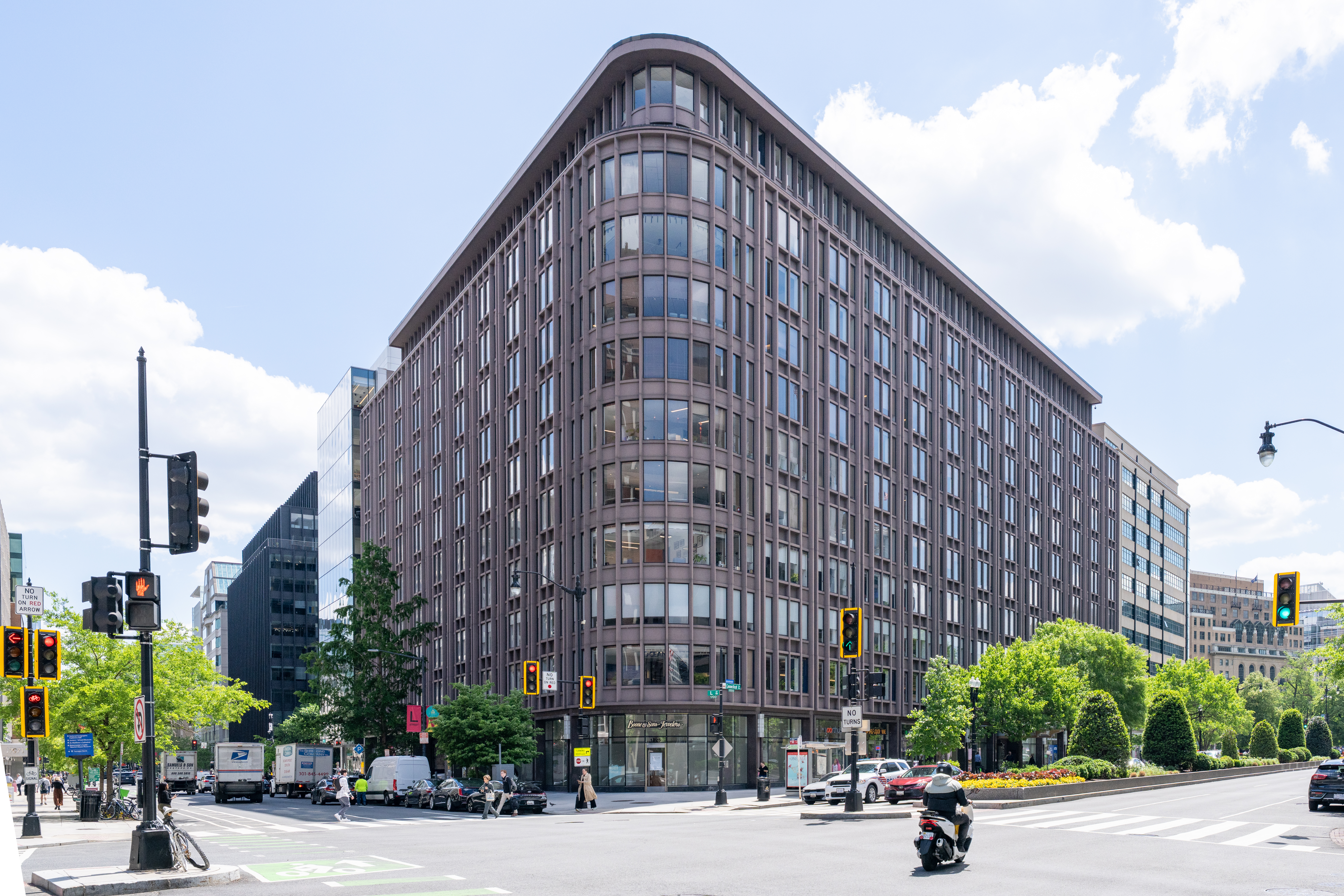
- The center's office is located in 1025 Connecticut Avenue.
- Founder: Richard Nixon
- Established: 1994
- Focus: Foreign policy
- Staff: 18
- Subsidiaries: The National Interest
- Formerly called: Nixon Center for Peace and Freedom
- Address: 1025 Connecticut Ave NW, S-1200; Washington, DC 20036
- Location: United States
- Coordinates: 38.9033°N 77.0393°W
- Interactive map of Center for the National Interest
- Website: cftni.org

The Center for the National Interest (CFNI) is a Washington, D.C.–based public policy think tank. It was established by former U.S. President Richard Nixon on January 20, 1994, as the Nixon Center for Peace and Freedom.

== History ==
The group changed its name to The Nixon Center in 1998. In 2001 the center acquired The National Interest, a bimonthly journal, in which it tends to promote the realist perspective on foreign policy.

In March 2011, the center was renamed the Center for the National Interest (CFTNI or CNI). The change was due to a conflict between Center leadership and the Richard Nixon Family Foundation and was part of "a long-running battle over former President Richard Nixon's complicated legacy," with Foundation members criticizing the center's president for "attacking their party's presidential candidate, John McCain, for his denunciations of Russia's invasion of Georgia," and "discomfort at the Center over the Foundation’s obsession with re-litigating Watergate and its legacy." Despite its separation from the Nixon Foundation, the center's leadership expressed its desire to "continue its forward-looking application of Nixon's foreign policy principles to today's international environment."

According to the 2014 Global Go To Think Tank Index Report (Think Tanks and Civil Societies Program, University of Pennsylvania), the center is number 43 (of 60) in the "Top Think Tanks in the United States". According to the 2019 Global Go To Think Tank Index Report, the center is number 46 (of 107) in the "Top Think Tanks in the United States". In 2006 it had an annual budget of $1.6 million.

In 2016, the think tank hosted Donald Trump's first major foreign policy address, leading to one of its fellows being fired for criticizing the organization's decision in an op-ed article. The Trump campaign's interactions with Simes and the Center became part of the 2017–2019 Special Counsel investigation. The Mueller report ultimately found no evidence of wrongdoing by Simes or the center, but the investigation reportedly hurt the think tank financially.

== Organization ==
As of 2008, the center had a staff of approximately twenty people supporting seven main programs: Korean Studies, Energy Security and Climate Change, Strategic Studies, US-Russia Relations, U.S.-Japan Relations, China and the Pacific, and Regional Security (Middle East, Caspian Basin and South Asia).

As of 2023, its Board of directors consists of Chairman Emeritus Maurice R. Greenberg, Chairman Drew Guff, and Vice Chairman Richard Plepler. Members include Senator Pat Roberts, Graham Allison, Jeffrey Bewkes, former ambassador Richard Burt, Kris Elftmann, Jacob Heilbrunn, David Keene, former ambassador Zalmay Khalilzad, Julie Nixon Eisenhower, Grover Norquist, William Ruger, Paul J. Saunders, Dimitri K. Simes, J. Robinson West and David Zalaznick.

As of 2023, its Advisory Council includes Chairman Dov Zakheim, Ahmed Charai, Peter Charow, Susan Eisenhower, Evan Greenberg, Bob Kerrey, John D. Negroponte, Lee Feinstein, and Thomas Pickering.

Its CEO for nearly 30 years was Dimitri K. Simes, who retired at the end of 2022. The current president, Paul J. Saunders, was appointed in early 2024. Saunders is a former Senior U.S. State Department official.

== See also ==
- Timeline of Russian interference in the 2016 United States elections
- Timeline of investigations into Trump and Russia (2019–2020)
