= Richard R. Burt =

American diplomat

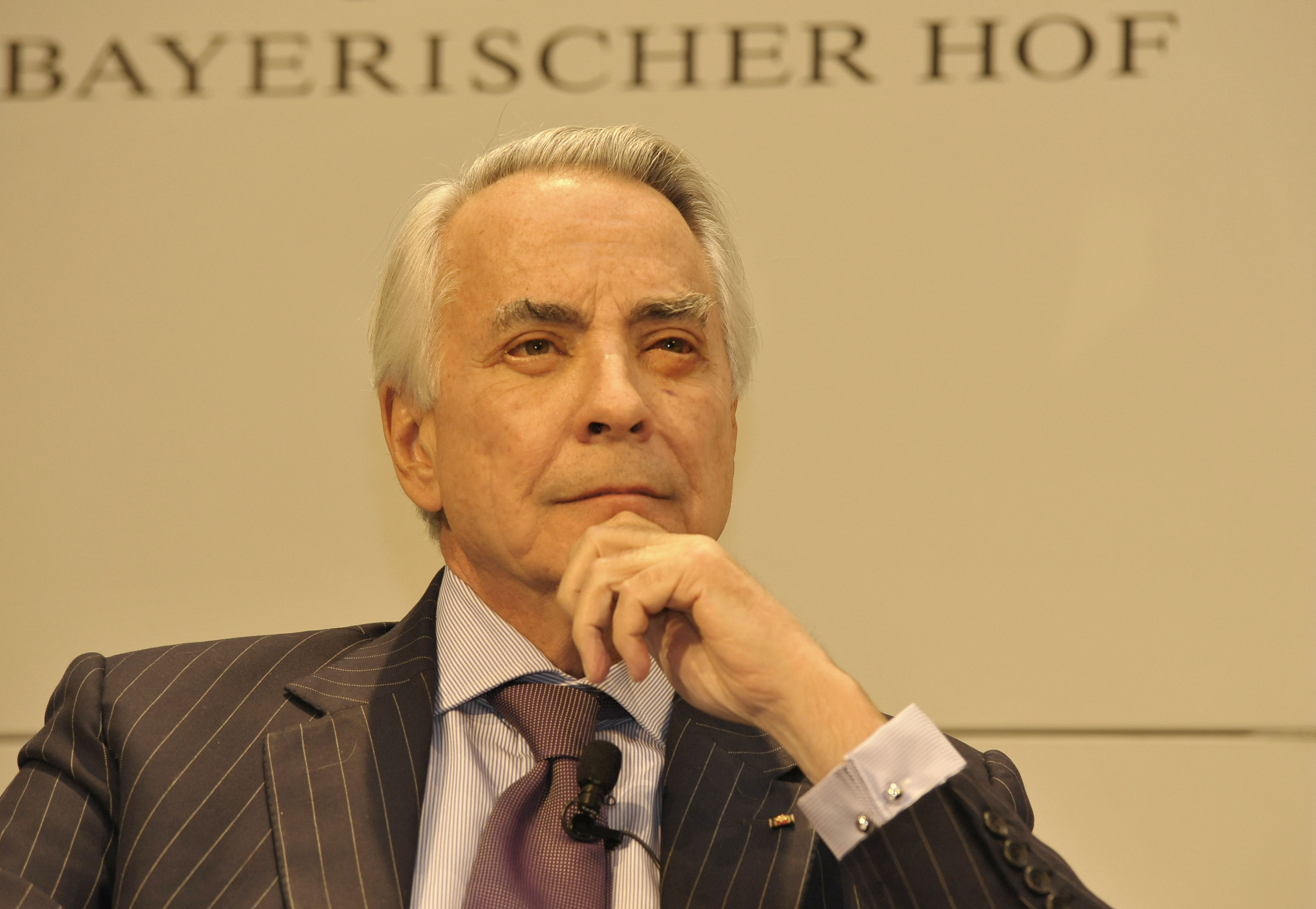

United States Ambassador to West Germany
- In office September 16, 1985 – February 17, 1989
- President: Ronald Reagan
- Preceded by: Arthur F. Burns
- Succeeded by: Vernon A. Walters

13th Assistant Secretary of State for European and Canadian Affairs
- In office February 18, 1983 – July 18, 1985
- Preceded by: Lawrence Eagleburger
- Succeeded by: Rozanne L. Ridgway

6th Director of the Bureau of Political-Military Affairs
- In office January 23, 1981 – February 17, 1982
- Preceded by: Reginald H. Bartholomew
- Succeeded by: Jonathan Howe

Personal details
- Born: February 3, 1947 (age 79) Sewell, Chile
- Party: Republican
- Education: Cornell University; Tufts University

Richard R. Burt (born February 3, 1947) is an American businessman and diplomat who served as United States Ambassador to Germany and was a chief negotiator of the Strategic Arms Reduction Treaty. Prior to his diplomatic career, Burt worked as director of a non-governmental organization and from 1977 to 1980 was a national security correspondent for The New York Times.

== Early life and education ==
Burt was born on February 3, 1947, in Sewell, Chile. He attended Cornell University, where he was a member of Alpha Delta Phi. He earned his bachelor's degree, and earned a master's degree in international relations from the Fletcher School of Law and Diplomacy at Tufts University in 1971. Following graduate school, he was selected for a research fellowship at the United States Naval War College. Following this fellowship, Burt moved to London to work as a research associate and later Assistant Director of the International Institute of Strategic Studies. In 1977, he was hired by The New York Times to work as a correspondent on national security issues.

== Career ==
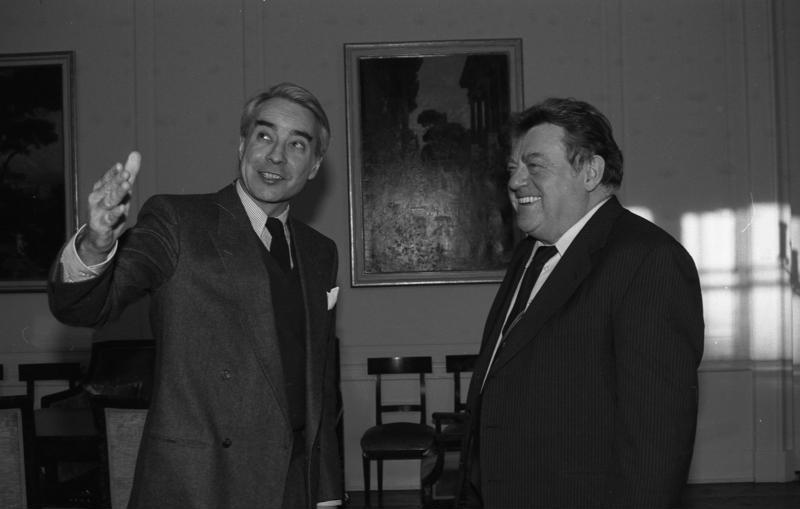
Richard Burt (left) with Franz Josef Strauß

Burt began working for the United States Department of State in the early 1980s. In 1981, he was appointed Director of Politico-Military Affairs, and in 1983 Assistant Secretary of State for European and Canadian Affairs. In 1985, he became the United States Ambassador to Germany. He assisted in the 11 February 1986 exchange of nine persons including Anatoly Shcharansky and Hana and Karl Koecher across the Glienicke Bridge in Berlin. His tenure as Ambassador to Germany coincided with the beginning of the process that would lead to the reunification of Germany. In 1989, President George H. W. Bush appointed Burt as chief negotiator for the Strategic Arms Reduction Treaty (START I) between the United States and the Soviet Union, with the rank of ambassador. The treaty, signed in 1991, limited the number of nuclear weapons that the two countries could have.

After negotiation of the START I treaty, Burt left government service and entered the private sector. He served as John McCain's top national security adviser during McCain's 2000 and 2008 Presidential campaigns.

=== Private intelligence firm (2000–2007) ===
In 2000, he, Lord Powell of Bayswater and others founded the Washington, D.C.–based private intelligence and risk-assessment and management firm Diligence with Diligence Europe headed by Michael Howard. While he chaired Diligence, Nathaniel Rothschild, a close friend of Oleg Deripaska, purchased a large stake in Diligence. While Deripaska was banned from entering the United States from 1998 to 2010, he hired Diligence for corporate intelligence gathering, visa lobbying through its considerable GOP connections and, crucially, helping to obtain a $150 million World Bank/European Bank for Reconstruction and Development loan for the Komi Aluminum Project at Sosnogorsk, Komi Republic, a Deripaska subsidiary of Rusal. Through the support from Diligence, Deripaska received a multiple entry visa to the United States in December 2005. From the spring to October 2005, Diligence performed Project Yucca for BGR (Note: Founded by Haley Barbour, BGR was hired by Alfa Group through its subsidiary Altimo. The IPOC International Growth Fund, which controls several Russian telecoms, is closely associated with Leonid Reiman.) in which the auditing firm KPMG was infiltrated by Diligence in order to obtain KPMG's audit of the Jeffrey Galmond and Leonid Reiman associated firm IPOC International Growth Fund for the benefit of Alfa Group's telecom subsidiary Altimo. During Project Yucca, the shareholders of Diligence were CEO Nick Day who was a former British agent, the Chairman of Diligence Richard Burt, the Exxel Group which is a Buenos Aires private equity firm, and Edward Mathias from The Carlyle Group which is a private equity company from Washington D.C. The Bermuda government had accused the IPOC International Growth Fund, which is a Bermuda registered owner of Russian telecoms, (Note: In 2006, the beneficial owner of IPOC International Growth Fund was found to be Leonid Reiman according to a Zurich ruling by the International Chamber of Commerce.) of money laundering and also accused Diligence of impersonating secret service personnel. KPMG successfully sued Diligence for fraud and unjust enrichment and received a settlement of $1.7 million from Diligence on June 20, 2006.

=== Consulting work after Diligence (since 2007) ===
In 2007, he left Diligence to work with Henry Kissinger's consulting firm, Kissinger McLarty Associates. (Note: Vladimir Putin is very close to and has a very warm longtime relationship with Henry Kissinger. Kissinger Associates does not disclose if it lobbies on behalf of Russian foreign policy interests.)

He has also worked as a partner in consulting firms McKinsey and Company and now serves as a managing partner of McLarty Associates in Washington, D.C. In addition, he has served on boards for the Atlantic Council, Deutsche Bank's Scudder and Germany mutual fund families, America Abroad Media, International Games Technology, UBS mutual funds, a member of the senior advisory board of Alfa Bank in Moscow until November 2016, an advisor to European Aeronautic Defence and Space Company (EADS) North America’s board until November 2016, and Textron Corporation. Burt is also a Senior Advisor to the Center for Strategic and International Studies and U.S. Chair of Global Zero. He has lobbied on behalf of LOT Polish Airlines, the Capital Bank of Jordan, and Ukrainian construction firm TMM. He has a working relationship with Mikhail Fridman who is closely associated with the Alfa Group.

In 2014 through early 2016, Burt served as an unpaid foreign policy advisor for Rand Paul's campaign for president.

During the first two quarters of 2016, McLarty Associates received $365,000 to lobby for New European Pipeline AG, a firm owned by Russian oil company Gazprom. Beginning in February 2016, he and a colleague represented the five European energy companies investing in Nord Stream 2, an expansion of the Nord Stream 1 pipeline which would allow Russian gas to reach Europe without going through Belarus or Ukraine. Since 2017, Burt and another lobbyist of a subsidiary of McLarty Associates have received $3.53 million from five Nord Stream 2 financing companies.

=== Supported Donald Trump for president ===
Burt claims to have contributed to Trump's first major foreign policy speech, April 27, 2016, at the Mayflower Hotel. In the speech, Trump called for greater cooperation with Russia and encouraged Trump to take a less interventionist approach to foreign affairs. In an April 2019 interview of the Center for the National Interest's Dmitry Simes by Christiane Amanpour, Burt was the top national security adviser to the 2016 Trump campaign. During the campaign, Burt also wrote white papers for Jeff Sessions on foreign policy and national security. (Note: Jeff Sessions was the national security committee chairman for Trump's 2016 campaign.)

Burt's simultaneous roles as a campaign adviser for Trump and a lobbyist for Russian interests first drew scrutiny in October 2016 following the release of the Steele dossier. Burt is on both the senior advisory board of the Russian Alfa Bank and the Irina Krivosheeva headed Alfa Capital Partners Advisory Board in which Russia's Alfa-Bank is an investor.

=== Supported Joe Biden for President ===
In 2020, Burt, along with over 130 other former Republican national security officials, signed a statement that asserted that President Trump was unfit to serve another term, and "To that end, we are firmly convinced that it is in the best interest of our nation that Vice President Joe Biden be elected as the next President of the United States, and we will vote for him."

Burt is a board member of the Dmitri Simes headed Center for the National Interest.

== See also ==
- Links between Trump associates and Russian officials
- Russian interference in the 2016 United States elections
- Timeline of Russian interference in the 2016 United States elections
- Timeline of post-election transition following Russian interference in the 2016 United States elections
- Timeline of investigations into Trump and Russia (January–June 2018)

== Notes ==
Government offices
Preceded by Reginald Bartholomew	Director of the Bureau of Politico-Military Affairs; January 23, 1981 – February 17, 1982	Succeeded by Jonathan Howe
Preceded by Lawrence Eagleburger	Assistant Secretary of State for European and Canadian Affairs; February 18, 1983 – July 18, 1985	Succeeded by Rozanne L. Ridgway
Diplomatic posts
Preceded by Arthur F. Burns	United States Ambassador to Germany; 1985–1989	Succeeded by Vernon A. Walters
