= Francis J. Meehan =

American diplomat (1924–2022)

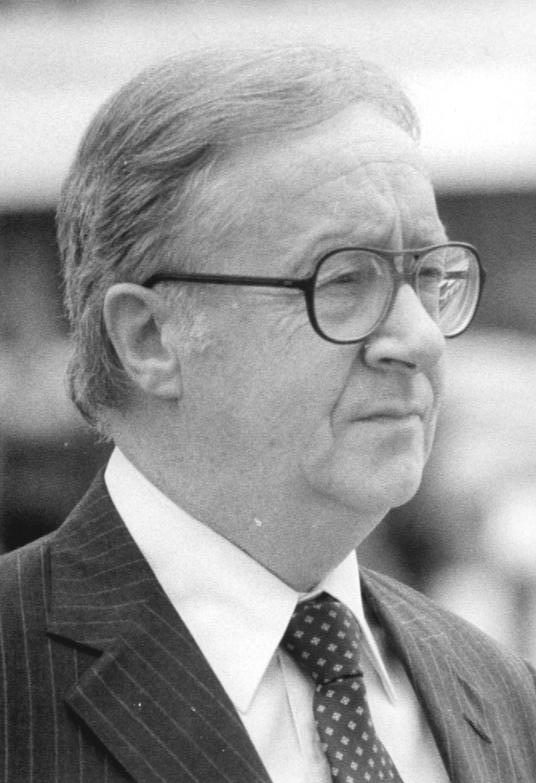
- Meehan in 1985

United States Ambassador to East Germany
- In office 16 September 1985 – 30 November 1988
- President: Ronald Reagan
- Preceded by: Rozanne L. Ridgway
- Succeeded by: Richard Clark Barkley

United States Ambassador to Poland
- In office 2 October 1980 – 11 February 1983
- President: Ronald Reagan
- Preceded by: William E. Schaufele Jr.
- Succeeded by: John R. Davis Jr.

United States Ambassador to Czechoslovakia
- In office 23 March 1979 – 20 October 1980
- President: Jimmy Carter
- Preceded by: Thomas Ryan Byrne
- Succeeded by: Jack F. Matlock Jr.

Personal details
- Born: 14 February 1924 East Orange, New Jersey, U.S.
- Died: 7 May 2022 (aged 98) Helensburgh, Scotland
- Education: University of Glasgow; Harvard University

Francis Joseph Meehan (14 February 1924 – 7 May 2022) was an American diplomat who served as the United States Ambassador to several of the Eastern Bloc states during his career. His final posting was as United States Ambassador to East Germany.

== Early life ==
Meehan was born in the United States city of East Orange, New Jersey, to Scottish parents, who were staying in the United States for a short period. He would move to Scotland when his homesick mother returned home, growing up in the Scottish shipbuilding town of Clydebank, situated eight miles (thirteen kilometers) west along the River Clyde from Glasgow.

Clydebank, as a centre of shipbuilding during World War II, was a major target for the Luftwaffe, and a teenage Meehan would help with the clear up after bombing raids. He graduated in 1945 from the University of Glasgow with a Master of Arts degree in history. He was, by this time, a fluent German speaker.

His birth in the United States rendered him an American citizen, and as such he was drafted in 1945 for military service, with his postings being to Fontainebleau for training, then onto Allied-occupied Germany. His education and fluent German made him consider a career with the United States Department of State.

Meehan completed his two years of military service in 1947, and took a position as a clerk at the Consular Agency of the United States, Bremen, serving from 1947 to 1948. His next posting was as an administrative assistant at the Economic Cooperation Administration in Washington, D.C., serving from 1948 to 1951, at which point he formally joined the United States Foreign Service.

== Diplomatic career ==
Meehan's first posting with the Foreign Service was to the United States High Commission for Germany from 1951 to 1952, where he served as an information officer. He then moved to the Consulate General of the United States, Hamburg, serving from 1952 to 1953. He moved to Paris and was attached to the NATO mission as a political officer, serving from 1953 to 1956.

He returned to the United States and attended Harvard University, where he studied for a master's degree in Public Administration, graduating in 1957. He also undertook Russian language classes whilst in the United States. He would be appointed an intelligence specialist within the Department of State in 1957, and was posted to Moscow in 1959, serving for two years to 1961. Meehan's posting to Moscow coincided with the Francis Gary Powers U-2 incident. He was despatched by the United States Ambassador to Russia to view the wreckage when the Soviet authorities placed it on display.

He was next assigned to Berlin as their political officer, and in this role, he was present in 1962 for the exchange of prisoners between the United States of America and the Soviet Union. The exchange of prisoners saw the U-2 pilot Francis Gary Powers exchanged for the Soviet spy Rudolf Abel on Glienicke Bridge. The exchange included the release of Frederic Pryor at Checkpoint Charlie, and Meehan was assigned to collect Pryor, working with the Stasi lawyer Wolfgang Vogel to handle the prisoner collection. The two men would become lifelong friends as a result of Vogel's prisoner exchange work.

Meehan spent time working at the Department of State in the United States from 1966 to 1968, initially as watch officer and then as the director of the Department of State's Operations Centre. He held the title Deputy Executive Secretary of the Department of State from 1967 to 1968.

His postings continued to increase in seniority, he was appointed Deputy Chief of Mission in Budapest from 1968 to 1972, moving to become the counsellor for political affairs in Bonn from 1972 to 1975. He was Deputy Chief of Mission in Vienna from 1975 to 1977 and then in Bonn from 1977 to 1979. Meehan and his wife became good friends with József Mindszenty during their posting to Hungary.

His first Ambassador level posting was in 1979, when he was appointed the United States Ambassador to Czechoslovakia in a short posting which lasted from 23 March 1979 to 20 October 1980. He was then appointed United States Ambassador to Poland, serving from 2 October 1980 to 11 February 1983. His posting to Poland was particularly eventful; he was visiting Washington, D.C., on business when Wojciech Jaruzelski imposed martial law in Poland, his return to Poland required the United States Embassy to smuggle Meehan across the now sealed border hidden in the back of a van.

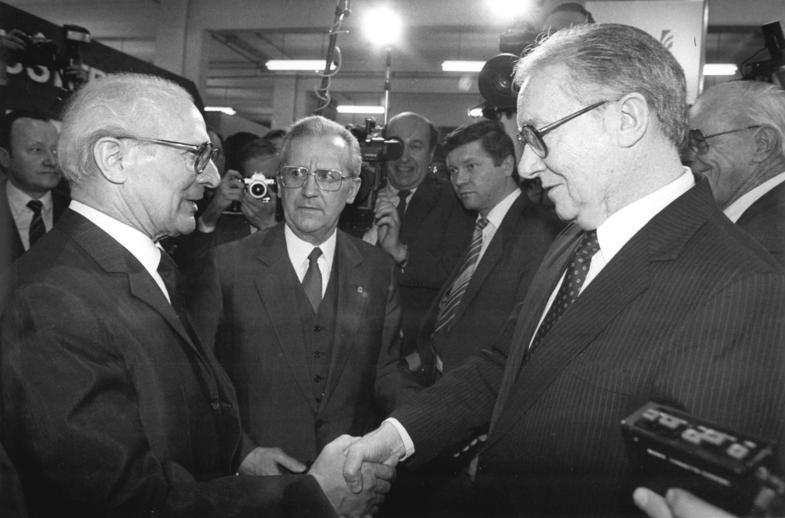
Meehan shaking hands with East Germany's leader Erich Honecker in 1987.

Meehan then took a research position at Georgetown University, and was also a senior foreign policy officer in the Office for Management Operations at the Department of State from October 1984 to April 1985.

His final posting was as United States Ambassador to East Germany, serving from 16 September 1985 to 30 November 1988. He was present when United States President Ronald Reagan made the famous Tear down this wall! speech. He returned to his research position at Georgetown University at the conclusion of his East Berlin posting.

He was fluent in German, Russian, French, Polish, Czech and Hungarian by the conclusion of his diplomatic career. He was deeply interested in Russia and Moscow, consequently he had hoped for the 'prize' of the United States Ambassador to Russia posting, but it was to elude him at the end of his career.

== Retirement ==
Meehan retired from the United States Foreign Service at the end of his appointment in 1988. He and his wife moved to Helensburgh in what was their 23rd home since their marriage. Meehan would write some briefing notes and material about the Eastern Bloc, more recently, there has been media interest about such a high-profile American diplomat living quietly in Helensburgh. BBC Scotland produced a 30-minute documentary about Meehan's career and some of his thoughts on the current political climate in both Washington DC and Moscow; this program aired on 3 April 2017.

== Personal life ==
Meehan married Margaret (née Kearns) in Manhattan, New York in 1949, though the couple had initially met in Clydebank, where Margaret and her family lived. The Kearns family were evacuated to Helensburgh when Clydebank was subject to the heaviest aerial bombardments during World War II. Meehan and his family would be evacuated to Dumbarton, but Frank and Margaret had the same group of friends and shared interests, which included hillwalking, and they stayed in contact.

Margaret travelled to the United States to marry her fiancée, but worked, initially, as a child minder. She easily took to her role as a hostess and her skills in organising and hosting functions were well known within the Foreign Service.

Meehan and his wife had four children; Anne, Catherine, Frances and Jim.

Margaret died on 15 March 2015, aged 92, after a lengthy illness, during which she was cared for by her husband and family. Margaret was sufficiently well known for The Scotsman to publish an obituary shortly after her death.

Meehan was awarded an honorary degree (Doctor of Laws) from the University of Glasgow in 1986.

Meehan died in Helensburgh on 7 May 2022, at the age of 98.
