= James Dobbins (diplomat) =

American diplomat (1942–2023)

James F. Dobbins
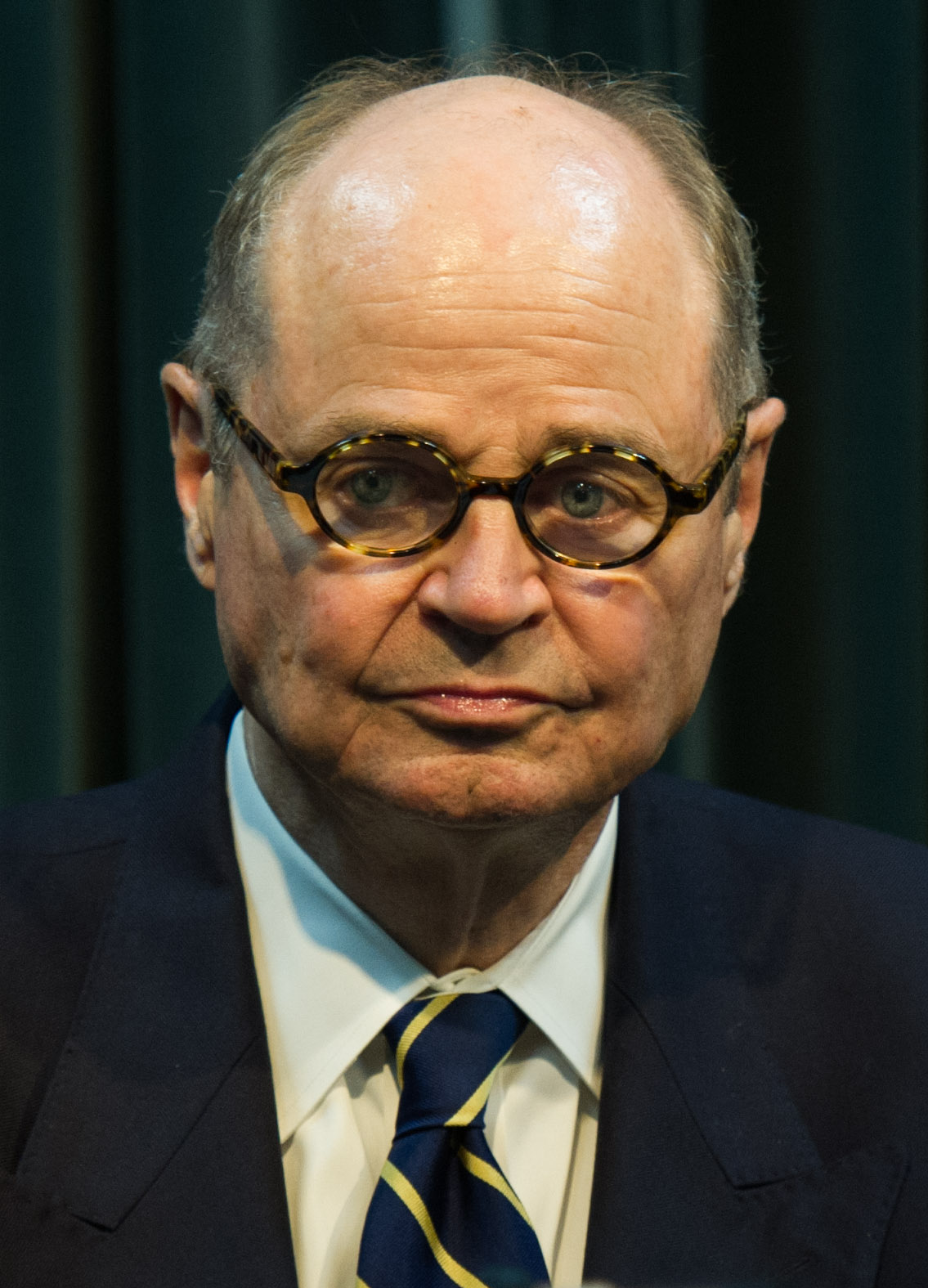

3rd United States Special Representative for Afghanistan and Pakistan
- In office May 10, 2013 – July 21, 2014
- President: Barack Obama
- Preceded by: Marc Grossman
- Succeeded by: Dan Feldman

United States Ambassador to Afghanistan
- Acting
- In office December 17, 2001 – January 1, 2002
- President: George W. Bush
- Preceded by: Diplomatic relations reestablished
- Succeeded by: Ryan Crocker (acting)

21st Assistant Secretary of State for European Affairs
- In office January 2, 2001 – June 1, 2001
- President: Bill Clinton; George W. Bush
- Preceded by: Marc Grossman
- Succeeded by: A. Elizabeth Jones

United States Ambassador to the European Union
- In office October 9, 1991 – July 31, 1993
- President: George H. W. Bush; Bill Clinton
- Preceded by: Thomas Michael Tolliver Niles
- Succeeded by: Stuart E. Eizenstat

Personal details
- Born: May 31, 1942 New York City, New York, U.S.
- Died: July 3, 2023 (aged 81)
- Spouse: Toril Kleivdal
- Education: Georgetown University
- Profession: Diplomat, Career Ambassador

James Francis Dobbins Jr. (May 31, 1942 – July 3, 2023) was an American diplomat who served as United States ambassador to the European Union (1991–1993), assistant secretary of state for European affairs (2001), and special representative for Afghanistan and Pakistan (May 2013–July 2014). He was a member of the American Academy of Diplomacy. Additionally, Dobbins served as envoy to Kosovo, Bosnia, Haiti, and Somalia. In 2001, he led negotiations leading to the Bonn Agreement, and served as acting ambassador of the United States to Afghanistan during the transitional period. He was later head of international and security policy for the RAND Corporation.

== Education ==
Dobbins graduated with a BS in international affairs from the School of Foreign Service at Georgetown University.

== Death ==
Dobbins died from complications of Parkinson's disease on July 3, 2023, at the age of 81.

== Works ==
- "Iraq: Winning the Unwinnable Wars", Foreign Affairs, January/February 2005
- "Who Lost Iraq?", Foreign Affairs, September/October 2007
- "Counterinsurgency in Iraq", Senate Armed Services Committee, 2-26-09
- Dobbins, James (March 3, 2009). "To Talk With Iran, Stop Not Talking". The Washington Post.
- Dobbins, James (January 16, 2010). "Skip the Graft". The New York Times.
- Occupying Iraq: A History of the Coalition Provisional Authority The RAND Corporation. By James Dobbins, Seth G. Jones, Benjamin Runkle, Siddharth Mohandas, 2009.
- Extending Russia: Competing from Advantageous Ground The RAND Corporation. By James Dobbins, Raphael S. Cohen, Nathan Chandler, Bryan Frederick, Edward Geist, Paul DeLuca, Forrest E. Morgan, Howard J. Shatz, Brent Williams, 2019.

== Bibliography ==
- The UN's Role in Nation-Building: From the Congo to Iraq. RAND Corporation. 2005. ISBN 978-0-8330-3589-9.
- The RAND History of Nation-Building. RAND Corporation. 2005. ISBN 978-0-8330-3739-8.
- The Beginner's Guide to Nation-Building. RAND National Security Research Division. 2007. ISBN 978-0-8330-3988-0.
- Europe's Role in Nation-Building: From the Balkans to the Congo. RAND Corporation. 2008. ISBN 978-0-8330-4138-8.
- After the War: Nation-Building from FDR to George W. Bush. RAND Corporation. 2008. ISBN 978-0-8330-4181-4.
- After the Taliban: Nation-Building in Afghanistan. Potomac Books. 2008. ISBN 978-1-59797-083-9.
- James Dobbins; Seth G. Jones; Benjamin Runkle (2009). Occupying Iraq: A History of the Coalition Provisional Authority. RAND Corporation. ISBN 978-0-8330-4665-9.

Diplomatic posts
Preceded by Diplomatic relations reestablished	United States Ambassador to Afghanistan; Acting; December 2001 – January 2002	Succeeded by Ryan Crocker; Acting
