= James D. Bindenagel =

American diplomat

J.D. Bindenagel
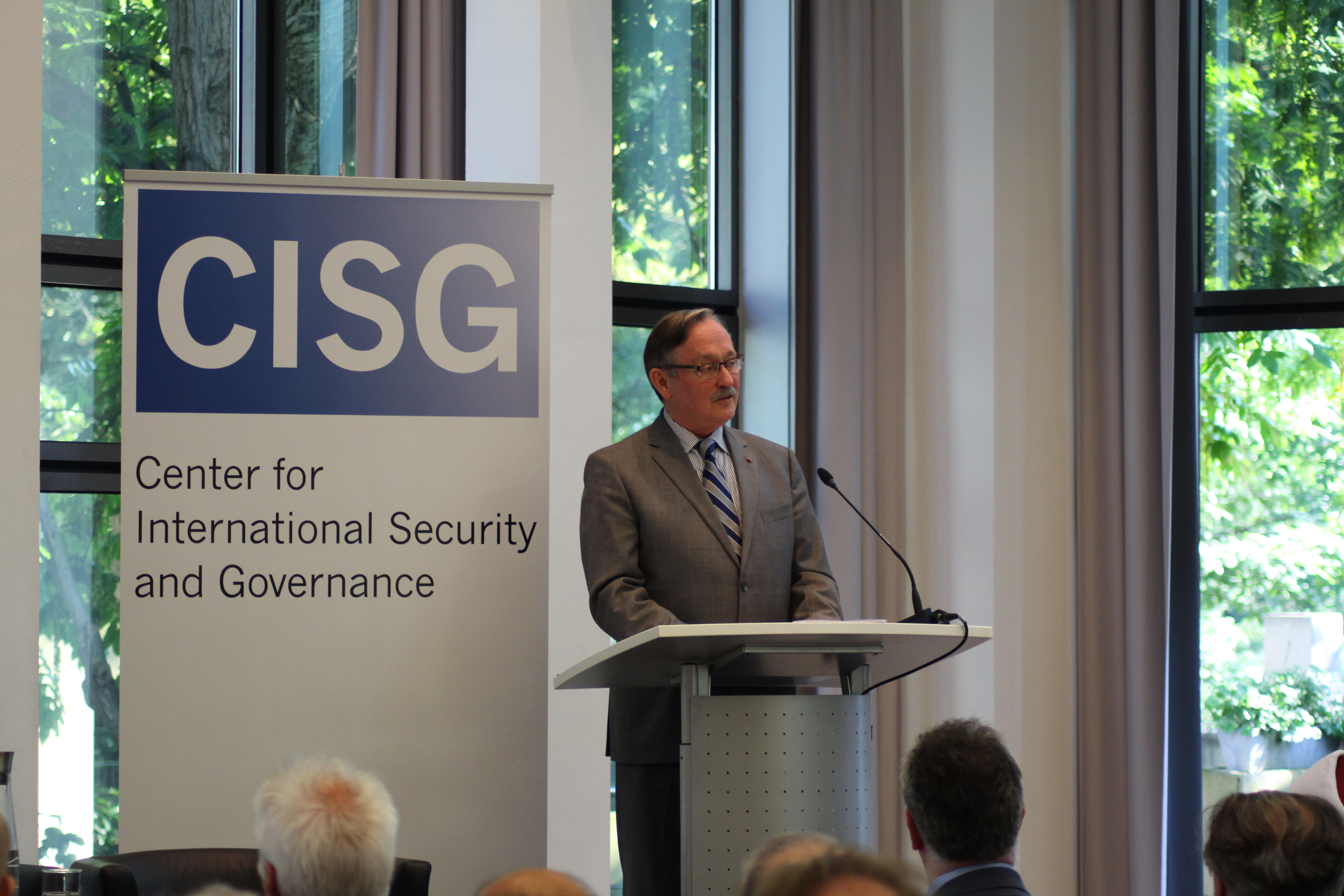
- Bindenagel during a lecture at the Center for International Security and Governance at the University of Bonn

Chargé d'affaires to Germany
- In office June 17, 1996 – September 10, 1997
- President: Bill Clinton
- Preceded by: Charles E. Redman
- Succeeded by: John C. Kornblum

Personal details
- Born: June 30, 1949 (age 77) Huron, South Dakota, U.S.
- Spouse: Jean Lundfelt Bindenagel
- Children: 2
- Education: University of South Dakota, University of Illinois at Urbana-Champaign

Military service
- Allegiance: United States
- Branch/service: US Army
- Rank: Second Lieutenant
- Unit: 3rd Infantry Division

James D. Bindenagel is an American diplomat and author who served as Chargé d'affaires to Germany from 1996 to 1997, and from 2014 to 2019, he served as director of the Center for International Security and Governance at the University of Bonn.

== Early life and education ==
Bindenagel was born on June 30, 1949, in Huron, South Dakota. He graduated from Huron High School in 1967 and attended the University of South Dakota. He holds a Master of Arts in public administration and a Bachelor of Arts in political science from the University of Illinois at Urbana-Champaign. He married Jean Lundfelt Bindenagel in 1973, they have two children.

Bindenagel served in the U.S. Army as a second lieutenant with the 3rd Infantry Division.

== Career ==
=== Early diplomatic career ===
In the early 1990s, Bindenagel worked in the private sector, as director of International Government-Business Programs at Rockwell International. From 1992 to 1994, he was director of the Central European Affairs in the Bureau of European and Canadian Affairs in the U.S. State Department. At the time of the Fall of the Berlin Wall, he was serving as deputy chief of mission to East Germany, and helped negotiate the Reunification of Germany. He served as deputy chief of mission to Germany from 1994 to 1996.

=== Chargé d'affaires to Germany (1996–1997) ===
Bindenagel was appointed chargé d'affaires to Germany by Bill Clinton, on June 17, 1996, to replace Charles E. Redman. While serving as chargé d'affaires, Bindenagel attended the unveiling of the Berlin Wall Monument in Chicago. He was terminated from the mission on September 10, 1997, and replaced by John C. Kornblum.

=== Post-diplomatic career ===
In 1999, Bindenagel was appointed by Bill Clinton as U.S. Ambassador and Special Envoy for Holocaust Issues. As Ambassador, he helped secure 6 Billion USD in payments from Germany, Austria, and France for Holocaust survivors. He served as vice president of the Chicago on Global Affairs and vice president of DePaul University.

From 2014 to 2019, Bindenagel served as the Henry Kissinger Professor for Security and Governance at the University of Bonn. He is currently a Senior professor at the university.

== Honors ==
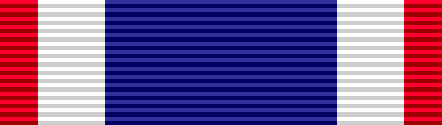
- Secretary's Distinguished Service Award, 2001
- Order of Merit of the Federal Republic of Germany, 2001

== Books ==
- International Security in the 21st Century: Germany's International Responsibility (2017; V&R Bonn). ISBN 9783847107620
- Germany from Peace to Power: Can Germany Lead in Europe Without Dominating It? (2020; V&R Bonn). ISBN 9783847010517
