= John C. Kornblum =

American diplomat and businessman (1943–2023)

John Christian Kornblum
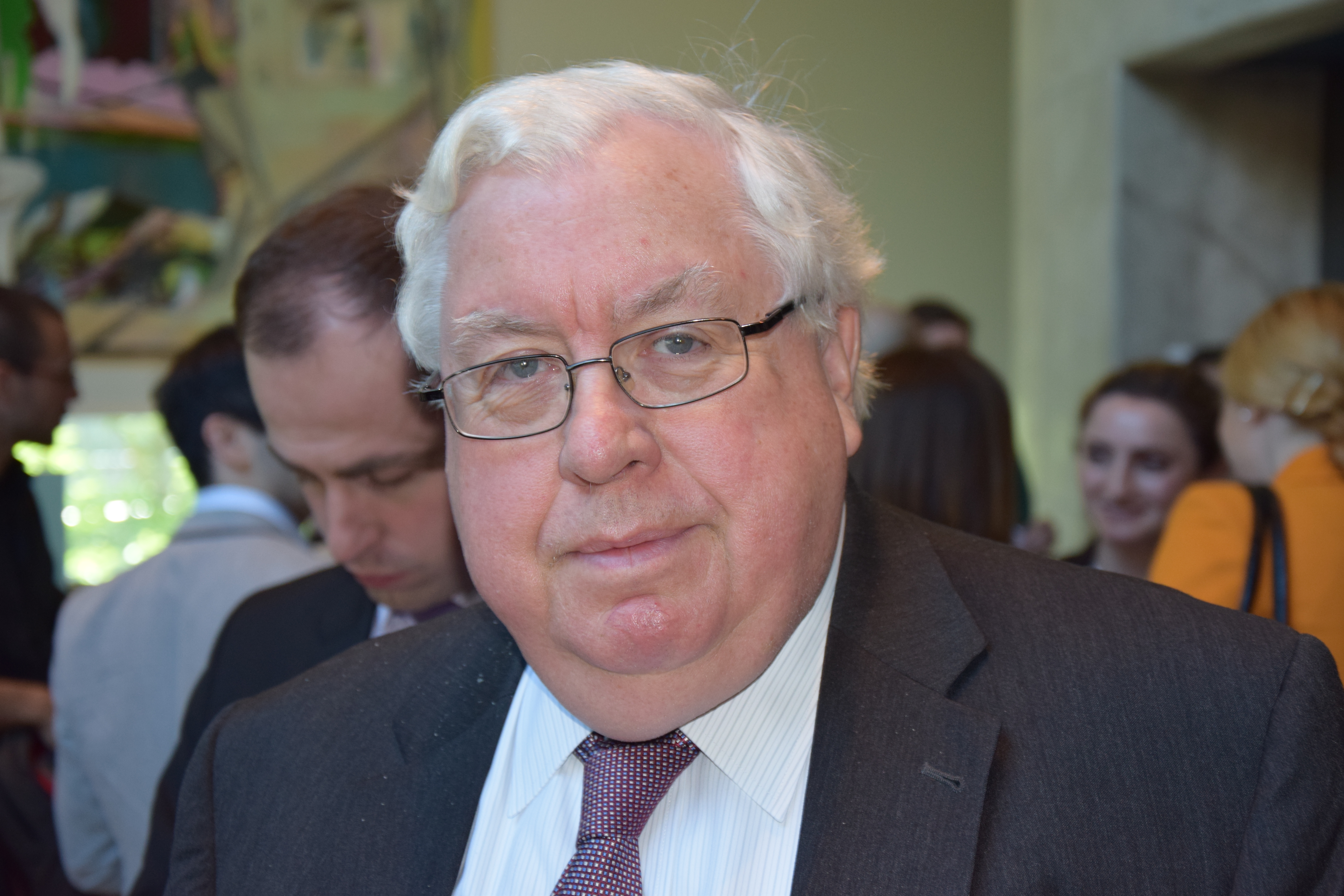

United States Ambassador to Germany
- In office September 10, 1997 – January 16, 2001
- President: Bill Clinton
- Preceded by: James D. Bindenagel (acting)
- Succeeded by: Daniel R. Coats

19th Assistant Secretary of State for European and Canadian Affairs
- In office July 3, 1996 – August 1, 1997
- Preceded by: Richard Holbrooke
- Succeeded by: Marc Grossman

Personal details
- Born: February 6, 1943 Detroit, Michigan, U.S.
- Died: December 21, 2023 (aged 80) Nashville, Tennessee, U.S.

John Christian Kornblum (February 6, 1943 – December 21, 2023) was an American diplomat and businessman. He entered the American Foreign Service in 1964. Over the next 35 years, he served at the State Department in Washington D.C. and in Europe, eventually becoming Ambassador to Germany. From 2001 onward, he established himself as an investment banker and international business consultant.

Kornblum was considered a leading expert on transatlantic economic and political affairs and on the evolving role of the Atlantic community in a multipolar world. He lectured and wrote widely in both German and English and was known especially for his press and television commentaries on the implications of globalization on both sides of the Atlantic.

== Diplomatic service ==
During his foreign service career, Kornblum specialized in European and east–west relations and played a defining role in many of the important events leading up to the end of the Cold War. These included the Quadripartite negotiations on Berlin (1970–1973), the Helsinki Final Act (1973–1975), the Belgrade Conference of the Organization for Security and Co-operation in Europe (OSCE) from 1977 to 1978, the stationing of [intermediate] nuclear weapons in Europe (INF) in the 1980s, U.S. President Ronald Reagan's historic 1987 appearance at the Brandenburg Gate in Berlin, German reunification (1990), the Helsinki Summit Conference of the OSCE (1992), the Dayton Agreement on the Balkans (1995), enlargement of NATO (1997), the post-Cold War security settlement with Russia and Ukraine and the agreement on compensation of slave laborers and establishment of the Reconciliation Foundation of German Industry (2000). Kornblum also served as U.S. Special Envoy to the Balkans (1995–1997) and directed two dramatic prisoner and spy exchanges on the Glienicke Bridge in Berlin in 1985 and 1986. The latter featured the release of Soviet dissident Anatoly Shcharansky (now known as Natan Sharansky).

Kornblum was a member of the State Department's Policy Planning Staff under Henry Kissinger (1973–1975), Director of the State Department's Office of Central European Affairs (1981–1985), United States Minister and Deputy Commandant in Berlin (1985–1987), Deputy Ambassador to NATO (1987–1991), Ambassador and head of the U.S. Mission to the OSCE in Vienna (1991–1994), and Assistant Secretary of State for European Affairs and Special Envoy to the Balkans (1995–1997). He served as the Ambassador to Germany from 1997 to 2001.

Kornblum was present from the beginning of negotiation of the Helsinki Final Act in 1973 and contributed several times to its implementation in the following years. He played a leading role in negotiating the Helsinki Summit Declaration, the "Challenges of Change" which devised a new operational role for the then Conference on Security and Cooperation in Europe (CSCE). Returning to Washington in 1994, he oversaw development of a post-Cold War Atlantic security strategy, including the enlargement of NATO in 1997, the NATO-Russia Council, the NATO-Ukraine Council, and the expansion, renaming, and reorganization of the CSCE to OSCE. In 1995 Kornblum was one of the main architects of the Dayton Peace Agreement.

=== Deputy Commandant in Berlin (1985–1987) ===
Kornblum's more than forty years of active presence in Europe rendered him one of the most experienced and effective American practitioners on Europe and Atlantic relations. Sometimes by chance, often by design, he was often at the center of dramatic events. A highpoint of his efforts was the June 1987 speech by President Ronald Reagan at the Brandenburg Gate in Berlin. Kornblum conceived and organized the event and worked for more than a year to gain acceptance for political initiatives which included the famous "tear down this wall" phrase in the President's speech.

Kornblum elaborated on the complex diplomacy which preceded President Reagan's speech at the Brandenburg Gate in an article entitled "Reagan's Brandenburg Concerto" (an allusion to the complex work of the Brandenburg concertos by Bach), which appeared in the May/June 2007 issue of The American Interest and was reprinted in the German newspaper Die Welt on June 12, 2007. Kornblum disclosed that Reagan's delivery of the speech at the most dramatic site along the Berlin Wall was planned for more than a year in advance by U.S. diplomats in Germany and Washington as a counterweight to the growing sentiment within Germany for an arrangement with the new, liberal Soviet leader Mikhail Gorbachev. Many Germans had begun to hope that in exchange for legal acceptance of the sovereignty of East Germany, the West could obtain the inclusion of West Berlin into West Germany and a gradual opening of the Wall. Any such deal with Gorbachev would have undermined hopes for a speedy German reunification and the liberation of Eastern Europe. Reagan's dramatic challenge to Gorbachev to "tear down this wall" was anything but an ad hoc remark. It was conceived by Kornblum and his team as a memorable slogan for a broader American initiative to remind both East and West that the United States was not willing to accept an undemocratic status quo in the center of Europe. The speech included a number of proposals to accelerate democratic change by making the wall more porous, and thus helped Gorbachev to open it. Kornblum's article goes on to describe the many political pressures exerted in Germany and Washington as this initiative was being implemented and concludes with reflections on the significance of the speech from a perspective 20 years later.

=== At NATO (1987–1991) ===
His service at NATO included helping prepare the new Alliance strategy after 1990 and negotiation of NATO's position for the conventional forces negotiations with the Soviet Union.

=== At OSCE Vienna (1991–1994) ===
From 1992 to 1994 Kornblum opened and headed the first American Mission to the Conference on Security and Cooperation in Europe (CSCE).

=== Special Envoy to the Balkans (1995–1997) ===
Kornblum served for two years as United States Special Envoy to the Balkans from 1995 to 1997.

=== Ambassador to Germany (1997–2001) ===
Kornblum's tenure as Ambassador to Germany was highlighted by the move of the German government from the West German capital in Bonn on the Rhine to a reunified Berlin. In 1999, he opened the Embassy of the United States in Berlin for the first time since it had been closed on December 8, 1941. The embassy was first housed in the building formerly used as the American Embassy to the German Democratic Republic. Constructing a new chancery on the site of the prewar building at the Brandenburg Gate turned out to be a difficult undertaking. Heightened United States security requirements led to a long and at times bitter dispute with Berlin authorities during which Kornblum became the target of repeated political and public criticism. Shortly before leaving office in 2001, Kornblum negotiated a settlement which was ultimately confirmed by U.S. Secretary of State Colin Powell in 2003. The new embassy opened on July 4, 2008.

== Later activities ==
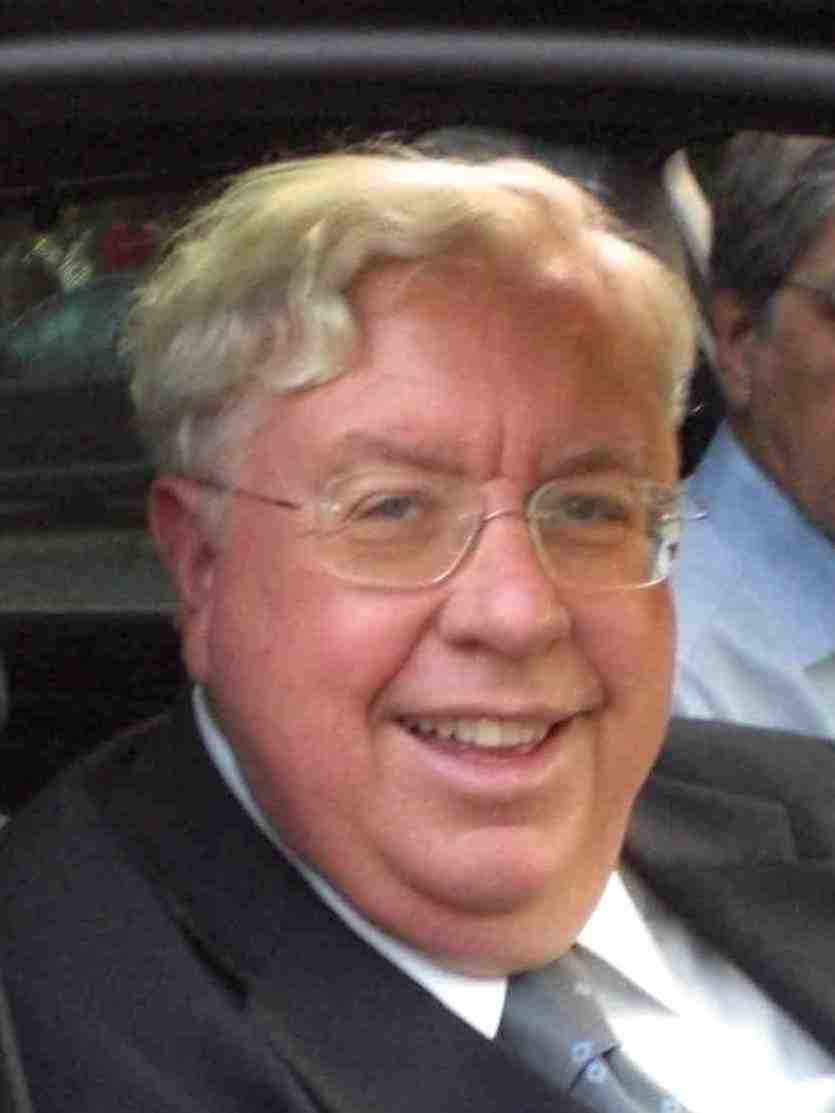
John C. Kornblum (2008)

After leaving diplomatic service, Kornblum pursued parallel career tracks in business, consulting, and political commentary in Europe and the United States. From 2001 to 2009, Kornblum served as chairman of the investment bank Lazard Freres Germany, which he helped build into one of the leading investment banks in Central Europe. He was also a member of the supervisory boards of Bayer AG, Thyssen-Krupp Technologies, and Motorola Europe. He was a member of the advisory councils of Russell Reynolds Associates and Consultum AG, and an advisor to the Finnish Innovation Fund SITRA and to the Center for Strategic and International Studies in Washington.

Kornblum served on numerous non-profit boards including the American Academy in Berlin, the German Institute for Community Organizing (DICO), and the Deutsche Oper in Berlin. He later served as adviser to a number of transatlantic companies including the international law firm Noerr and Pfizer. As of July 2010, Kornblum was also a member of the German Government Council for Immigration and Integration.

During the last ten years of his life, Kornblum established a strong public voice defining the implications for Europe and the United States of the new era in global politics which followed the end of the Cold War. He built on both his diplomatic and business experience to focus particularly on the issues connected with the rapidly changing relationships between government and the private sector in a globally integrated world. He spoke and wrote regularly in Europe and the United States on economic, security, and political issues. Kornblum did regular commentary for several European and American networks on American politics and foreign policy. Also, he was on the advisory board of OMFIF where he was regularly involved in meetings regarding the financial and monetary system.

Looking to the future of the Atlantic world, Kornblum presented his vision for the evolution of Germany and Europe in an article published in the November/December 2009 issue of the conservative political journal The American Interest. Here he argued that the end of Cold War confrontation and spread of free market systems made possible the establishment of a tight web of open-sourced networks which overcome traditional geography and create new patterns of culture and trade. Kornblum suggested that increasing global integration would gradually reduce Germany's fear of being caught in the middle of big power confrontation and give it a new sense of confidence. He concluded, "With its deepening sense of being at the center of a newly integrated world will come a growing sense of responsibility that will cause the ghosts of the past to gradually recede. Germany will not answer lingering questions about its normalcy; it will transcend them. By our lights today, Germany will not be normal, but nothing else will be either." A German translation of this article appeared in the Frankfurter Allgemeine Zeitung on November 6, 2009.

Kornblum expanded his commentary on the Obama era in the book Mission Amerika (2009), written in German together with well-known television commentator Dieter Kronzucker. Here the authors argued that the basis for the vision of change proclaimed by President Obama was created by wide-ranging social and demographic changes that had taken place in the United States during the preceding thirty years. They suggested that Obama's victory was a result of both a skillful campaign and a dramatic evolution of American society, which delivered a ready audience for Obama's ideas. They warned, however, that Obama's program of transformation was likely to encounter heavy resistance in the wake of the 2008 financial crisis.

During 2012 and 2013, Ambassador Kornblum served as a campaign advisor to the Georgian Dream party of Bidzina Ivanishvili. Ivanishvili credited him with playing an important role in Georgian Dream's 2012 victory, the first peaceful transfer of power in recent Georgian history. In later correspondence, Senator Charles E. Grassley queried whether Kornblum's activity had been registered in accordance with FARA legislation.

In June 2013 Kornblum became the founding chairman of the John F. Kennedy Atlantic Forum which was established to apply the principles of risk and reward culture to the growing trans-Atlantic entrepreneurial culture in Germany and Berlin.

== Awards ==
- Order of Merit of the Federal Republic of Germany: Great Cross of Merit, 1990
- Verdienstkreuz, Republic of Austria, 1994
- Distinguished Honor Award, Department of State, 1996
- Honorary Citizenship, Sarajevo, 1997
- Distinguished Alumnus, Michigan State University, 1999
- Ritter wider den tierischen Ernst, Aachen, 1999 (Aachen Carnival Award)
- Secretary's Award, US Department of State, 2000
- Silver Medal, American Chamber of Commerce in Germany, 2000
- Several Superior Honor Awards, Department of State, 1964–2001
- Medal of Honor, Organization for Security and Cooperation in Europe, 2013

== Board memberships ==
- Bayer AG (2002–2008)
- Thyssen-Krupp Technologies (2001–2006)
- Motorola GmbH, Germany (2005–2008)
- Advisory Board Consultum AG. Berlin (2006–2012)
- Advisory Board Russell Reynolds (2008–2014)
- Advisory Board chairman, Management Circle (2008–2018)

Non-profit boards:

- American Chamber of Commerce in Germany (AmCham Germany), Member of the board of directors
- American Academy in Berlin, Secretary
- American Institute for Contemporary German Studies (AICGS)
- American Council on Germany
- John F. Kennedy Atlantic Forum, Berlin, Chairman
- Center for Strategic and International Studies (CSIS), Washington
- Deutsche Oper Berlin
- Internationale Martin Luther Stiftung, Erfurt
- German Historical Museum, Berlin
- KCRW Berlin, Chairman
- John F. Kennedy Institute, Free University of Berlin
- Deutsches Institut für Community Organizing, Berlin
- Official Monetary and Financial Institutions Forum, London

== Personal life and death ==
John Kornblum's grandparents emigrated from Germany to America in the fall of 1882. He was married to Helen Sen Kornblum from 1987 until his death. They have two sons, Alexander (born 1988) and Stephen (born 1990). Kornblum died in Nashville, Tennessee, on December 21, 2023, at the age of 80.

== Selected works ==
- "The World Looks Up to the Germans". American Institute For Contemporary German Studies. 2006.
- "Frei sein oder gleich sein?". Die Welt (in German). November 19, 2006.
- "Remapping the World," Die Welt, July 2, 2008.
- The German Element, 2003
- "Reagan's Brandenburg Concerto", The American Interest, May/June 2007
- "Dialogue on the Expansion of NATO" (with Michael Mandelbaum), The American Interest, March/April 2008
- "Governing by Network," Frankfurter Allgemeine Sonntagszeitung, January 10, 2009
- Mission Amerika. Weltmacht am Wendepunkt (with Dieter Kronzucker and Redline Verlag), Gebundene Ausgabe, April 17, 2009
- "From the Middle to the Center: German Normality in an Integrated World", The American Interest, November/December 2009, pp. 68–70.
- "Zentrum einer integrierten Welt," Frankfurter Allgemeine Zeitung, November 6, 2009, p. 8.
- "Germany in Need of a Dream," International Herald Tribune, April 23, 2010, page 6.
- " Germany at 65, A New Chapter Begins," p. 23 Reflections on 20 Years of German Reunification American Institute for Contemporary German Studies, Washington, 2010.
- "We Need a New Atlanticism," published in German in "Handelsblatt," April 15, 2011, p. 9.

Government offices
| Preceded by Richard Holbrooke | Assistant Secretary of State for European and Canadian Affairs; July 3, 1996 – July 1, 1997 | Succeeded by Marc Grossman |
Diplomatic posts
| Preceded by James D. Bindenagel (as Chargé d'Affaires) | United States Ambassador to Germany; 1997–2001 | Succeeded by Daniel R. Coats |
