= Marc Grossman =

American diplomat

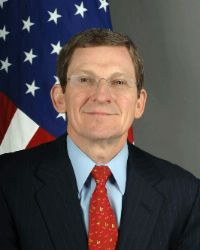
- US State Department portrait, c. 2011

2nd United States Special Representative for Afghanistan and Pakistan
- In office February 22, 2011 – December 14, 2012
- President: Barack Obama
- Preceded by: Richard Holbrooke
- Succeeded by: James Dobbins

18th Under Secretary of State for Political Affairs
- In office March 26, 2001 – February 25, 2005
- President: George W. Bush
- Preceded by: Thomas R. Pickering
- Succeeded by: R. Nicholas Burns

23rd Director General of the Foreign Service
- In office June 19, 2000 – March 26, 2001
- President: Bill Clinton
- Preceded by: Edward Gnehm
- Succeeded by: Ruth A. Davis

20th Assistant Secretary of State for European and Canadian Affairs
- In office August 5, 1997 – May 31, 2000
- President: Bill Clinton
- Preceded by: John C. Kornblum
- Succeeded by: James Dobbins

United States Ambassador to Turkey
- In office January 3, 1995 – June 1, 1997
- President: Bill Clinton
- Preceded by: Richard Clark Barkley
- Succeeded by: Mark Robert Parris

15th Executive Secretary of the United States Department of State
- In office 1993–1994
- President: Bill Clinton
- Preceded by: W. Robert Pearson
- Succeeded by: Kenneth C. Brill

Personal details
- Born: Mark Isaiah Grossman; September 23, 1951 (age 75) Los Angeles, California, United States
- Spouse: Mildred Anne Patterson (m. 1982)
- Children: 1
- Education: University of California, Santa Barbara (BA); London School of Economics (MSc)

Marc Isaiah Grossman (born September 23, 1951) is an American former diplomat and government official. He served as United States Ambassador to Turkey, Assistant Secretary of State for European Affairs, and Under Secretary of State for Political Affairs. He was most recently the United States Special Representative for Afghanistan and Pakistan and is currently a Vice Chairman of The Cohen Group, a business strategic advisory firm headed by former U.S. Secretary of Defense William Cohen, and a Vice Chair of the German Marshall Fund board of trustees.

== Early life and education ==
Grossman was born in Los Angeles, California on September 23, 1951. He attended the University of California, Santa Barbara and graduated in 1973 with a B.A. in political science. He later received an M.Sc. in international relations from the London School of Economics.

== Diplomatic career ==
=== Early career ===
Grossman served at the United States Embassy in Islamabad, Pakistan, from 1977 to 1979. He served as the Deputy Director of the Private Law Office of Peter Carington, 6th Baron Carrington, Secretary General of NATO, from 1983 to 1986. Grossman served as Deputy Chief of Mission at the United States Embassy in Ankara, Turkey from 1989 to 1992. From 1993 to 1994, Grossman managed operations for senior State Department leadership as Executive Secretary of the State Department and Special Assistant to the Secretary of State.

=== Ambassador to Turkey ===
Grossman returned to Turkey after being appointed United States Ambassador to Turkey on September 29, 1994. He began his role on January 3, 1995 and left the post on June 1, 1997.

=== Assistant Secretary of State for European and Canadian Affairs ===
Grossman served as Assistant Secretary of State for European Affairs from 1997 to 2000 and was responsible for over 4,000 State Department employees posted in 50 sites abroad with a program budget of $1.2 billion. He played a lead role in orchestrating NATO's 1999 Washington summit, marking the group's 50th anniversary, and helped direct U.S. participation in NATO’s military campaign in Kosovo that same year. While he entered office as the Assistant Secretary of State for European and Canadian Affairs, the title of the position was changed to Assistant Secretary of State for European Affairs on January 12, 1999.

=== Director General of the Foreign Service ===
From 2000 to 2001, Grossman served as the Director General of the United States Foreign Service and Director of Human Resources. At the direction of the Secretary of State, he revamped the State Department's human resource strategies, including the Department's strategies for training, assigning, and retaining personnel both at home and abroad.

=== Under Secretary of State for Political Affairs ===
Grossman was appointed Under Secretary of State for Political Affairs, the Department's third-ranking official, in March 2001. In 2004, Grossman attained the Foreign Service's highest rank when the President appointed him to the rank of Career Ambassador. He received the Secretary of State's Secretary's Distinguished Service Award the following year. Grossman served as Under Secretary of State for Political Affairs until his initial retirement in 2005.

=== Special Representative for Afghanistan and Pakistan ===
Grossman was lured out of retirement by Secretary of State Hillary Clinton to become the United States Special Representative for Afghanistan and Pakistan, an appointment he received following the death of the first Special Representative to Afghanistan and Pakistan, Richard Holbrooke. He began his role on February 22, 2011 and concluded his tenure on December 14, 2012.

== Private sector career ==
In January 2005, Grossman resigned from his position and joined The Cohen Group, an advisory firm providing corporate leadership with strategic advice in government regulation and raising capital. Grossman serves as Vice Chairman of the Cohen Group. The Cohen Group has close connections to the Turkish Army and represents some of the US’s largest weapons manufacturers, which stand to benefit from weapons sales to Turkey: Lockheed Martin, General Dynamics and Sikorsky Aircraft among others, and their list of clients includes controversial firms such as DynCorp International, a major national security contractor with the US government, charging billions for overseas military and police training. Through their strategic partnership with DLA Piper, the Cohen Group also serves foreign clients such as the Turkish government and Turkish trade associations, United Arab Emirates, India and Australia’s scandalous AWB. In late 2005, Grossman also joined Ihlas Holding, Turkish conglomerate which is also active in several Central Asian countries. Grossman is reported to receive $100,000 per month for his advisory position with Ihlas.

Until 2015, he served as the inaugural Chair of the Board of Advisors of the Master of Science in Foreign Service Program at the Edmund A. Walsh School of Foreign Service at Georgetown University, where he serves as a practitioner/faculty member. He is currently a member of the advisory board for DC-based non-profit organization America Abroad Media.

== Personal life ==
Grossman married Mildred Anne Patterson in May 1982. The couple had their first date on November 3, 1979, one day prior to the Iran hostage crisis. They have an adopted daughter, Anne, who was born in Giresun, Turkey. Grossman speaks French and Turkish in addition to English.

Diplomatic posts
Preceded by Richard Clark Barkley	United States Ambassador to Turkey; January 3, 1995 – June 1, 1997	Succeeded by Mark Robert Parris
Preceded by Edward Gnehm	Director General of the Foreign Service; June 19, 2000 – March 26, 2001	Succeeded by Ruth A. Davis
Government offices
Preceded by John C. Kornblum	Assistant Secretary of State for European and Canadian Affairs; August 5, 1997 – May 31, 2000	Succeeded by A. Elizabeth Jones
Preceded by Thomas R. Pickering	Under Secretary of State for Political Affairs; March 26, 2001 – February 25, 2005	Succeeded by R. Nicholas Burns
