= The National Interest =

American international affairs magazine

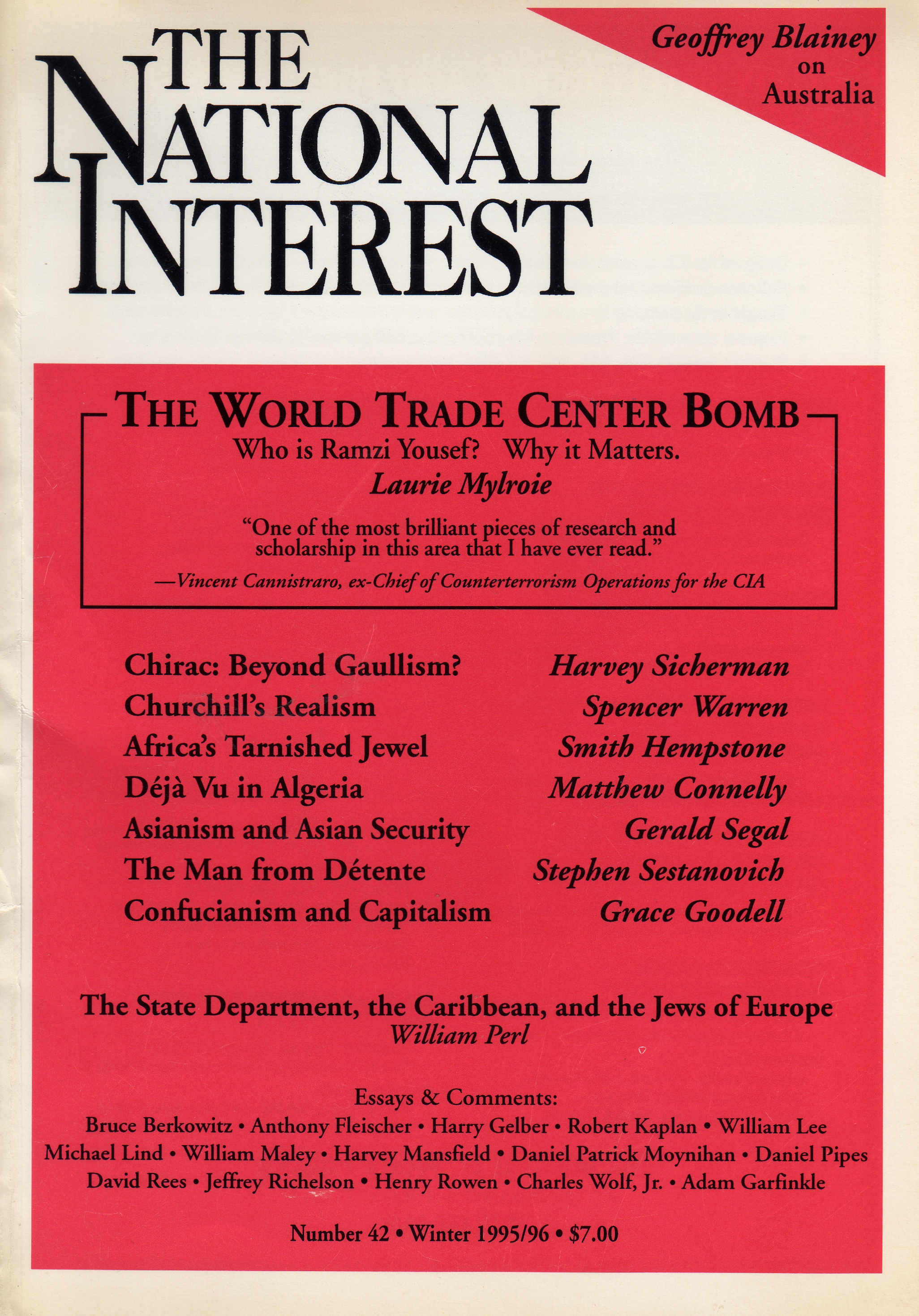
- Winter 1995/96 cover
- Editor: Jacob Heilbrunn (since July 2013)
- Categories: International affairs
- Frequency: Bi-monthly
- Founder: Irving Kristol
- Founded: 1985
- First issue: 1985
- Company: National Affairs, Inc. (1985–2001); Center for the National Interest (2001–present)
- Country: United States
- Based in: Washington, D.C., U.S.
- Website: nationalinterest.org
- ISSN: 0884-9382

The National Interest (TNI) is an American bimonthly international relations magazine edited by American journalist Jacob Heilbrunn and published by the Center for the National Interest, a public policy think tank based in Washington, D.C., that was established by former U.S. President Richard Nixon in 1994 as the Nixon Center for Peace and Freedom. The magazine is associated with the realist school of international studies.

== History ==
Founded in 1985 by American columnist and neoconservatism advocate Irving Kristol, the magazine was until 2001 edited by Australian academic Owen Harries.

In 2001, The National Interest was acquired by The Center for the National Interest, a public policy think tank based in Washington, D.C., that was established by former U.S. President Richard Nixon on January 20, 1994, as the Nixon Center for Peace and Freedom.

In 2005, ten editors of The National Interest resigned due to different viewpoints regarding the magazine's acquisition and with the larger editorial board. Those who left founded a separate journal, The American Interest.

In 2013, RealClearWorld named The National Interest one of the Best World Opinion Websites.

In January 2023, it shut down its print edition, which had dropped from 10,000 subscribers in the 1990s to around 2,000 subscribers.

== Influence and reception ==
The National Interest is credited with introducing ideas like "the West and the rest" and geoeconomics into public discourse. Political scientist Francis Fukuyama formulated his early political and philosophical thoughts on the end of history in the journal in 1989, where he argued that the worldwide spread of liberal democracies and free-market capitalism of the West and its lifestyle might signal the end point of humanity's sociocultural evolution and become the final form of human government. In 2005, Fukuyama left to found The American Interest, citing what he saw as excessive international relations realism supported by the Nixon Center.

In 2015, Maria Butina, who was later in 2018 convicted as a Russian spy, wrote an editorial in the magazine titled "The Bear and the Elephant" stating that only by electing a president from the Republican Party could the United States and Russia improve relations. The president, CEO, and publisher of the magazine at the time of Butina's editorial, Dimitri Simes, was later charged by the Justice Department for violating sanctions against Channel One Russia in September 2024 after FBI agents raided his Virginia home. Simes fled to Russia in 2022.

Writing in Politico, journalist James Kirchick argued in 2016 while commenting on Donald Trump's Russian relationships that The National Interest and its parent company "are two of the most Kremlin-sympathetic institutions in the nation's capital, even more so than the Carnegie Moscow Center."

== See also ==
- National Affairs
- Timeline of Russian interference in the 2016 United States elections
