= Herbert S. Okun =

American diplomat

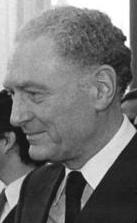
Okun in 1981

Herbert Stuart Okun (November 27, 1930 – November 8, 2011) was a United States Ambassador to East Germany (1980–1983) and the Deputy U.S. Ambassador to the United Nations (1985–1989). He was a member of the American Academy of Diplomacy. After his retirement from the U.S. State Department, he played a key role in unsuccessful efforts to halt the Balkan Wars in the early 1990s.

== Early life and education ==
Okun was born in Brooklyn. He earned his A.B. in history from Stanford University in 1951, and his Master of Public Administration from Harvard Kennedy School, then known as the Harvard Graduate School of Public Administration, in 1959. His father, a Jewish immigrant from Dzyarzhynsk, was a wholesale vegetable vendor in New York City.

== Career ==
Okun decided to become a diplomat at 16 after reading 1947 Foreign Affairs article in which scholar George F. Kennan, writing under the pseudonym "X", offered the strategy known as containment in response to Soviet expansionism during the Cold War. "I read it and said, 'That's what I want to do,'" Okun told The New York Times in 1993.

As a young foreign service officer, Okun translated the correspondence between President John F. Kennedy and Nikita Khrushchev during the Cuban Missile Crisis. Okun recalled that Khrushchev nicknamed him "ryzhyi" (redhead) because of his hair color.

He served with Frank Carlucci on US military attaché General Vernon A. Walters' team in Brazil at the time of the 1964 Brazilian coup d'état against President João Goulart.

In January 1975, following the Carnation Revolution in Portugal and at the advice of General Walters, now Deputy Director of the Central Intelligence Agency, Okun was appointed deputy to Frank Carlucci, the new US ambassador in Lisbon, by the United States Secretary of State Henry Kissinger, on a team tasked with getting the Portuguese Communist Party out of the government. Alongside Carlucci, he resisted Kissinger's readiness to rely on the far-right Democratic Movement for the Liberation of Portugal of General António de Spínola and instead worked through the moderate Socialist left, helping cultivate Lieutenant Colonel António Eanes, whom he dubbed "a boy scout for democracy".

Okun also was the chief State Department negotiator for the SALT Treaty. While at the United Nations, Okun led a walkout of the U.S. delegation during a speech by Iranian President Ali Khamenei in September 1987. "The false accusations that he made against our country distort the facts and totally misrepresent our policy," Okun told reporters. "I do not intend to sit by passively when our country is insulted, our President is pilloried and the truth is trampled."

After retiring from the foreign service, he served as chief aide to former Secretary of State Cyrus Vance and former British Foreign Secretary Lord David Owen in the talks to end the slaughter resulting from the break-up of Yugoslavia. Okun was "extraordinarily ready to listen to and to give credit to the opposing views," recalled Owen. "He was a person who did manage to build a measure of trust from the Serbians, which is not easy to do."

Okun testified against Serbian leader Slobodan Milošević at the International Criminal Tribunal for the former Yugoslavia in The Hague. In an interview, Okun said in 2006, "Observing how he talked and acted I could not come to any other conclusion than Milošević being a common gangster. You know, those types from Mafia movies with cigars in their mouths, who try to express themselves very theatrically but in reality are selling fog."

While serving as Vance and Owen's aide, Okun warned Serb leader Radovan Karadžić before the fighting started: "If you continue to talk about the mortal danger that Serbs are under in Bosnia, you will end up committing preemptive genocide." Karadžić later was charged with war crimes in the 1995 massacre at Srebrenica, where as many as 8,000 Bosnian Muslims were killed, and Okun also testified against him in The Hague.

"Diplomacy without force is like baseball without a bat," Okun famously said.

== Sources ==
- Maxwell, Kenneth (1995), The Making of Portuguese Democracy, Cambridge: Cambridge University Press, doi:10.1017/CBO9780511582752
- Rieff, David (1996). Slaughterhouse: Bosnia and the Failure of the West. Touchstone. ISBN 0-684-81903-1.
