= Baltic-American Freedom Foundation =

Organization based in Maine, USA

The Baltic-American Freedom Foundation is a non-profit foundation focused on programs of education and exchange centering on economic growth and democratic values. Endowed by proceeds from the Baltic-American Enterprise Fund, a U.S. Government-initiated investment fund, the foundation seeks to deepen the ties between and among Estonia, Latvia, Lithuania, and the United States and continues a longstanding American commitment to the Baltic region.

The foundation provides three main scholarships: Research Scholarships for Baltic professors and others in academia to pursue collaborative research in the U.S., Professional Internships for university students and recent graduates to gain professional experience in the U.S., Leadership Academy for Baltic high school students to learn entrepreneurship skills during a four-week summer program held on an American college campus. Baltic-American Dialogue grants provide funding for Baltic public organizations to host U.S. speakers on topics of mutual importance and interest. Baltic-American Security Exchange awards fund the exchange of critical knowledge and establish useful contacts between Baltic and U.S. security experts. Since inception in 2010, the foundation has awarded more than $17 million to more than 600 individuals and nearly 150 public organizations. Mr. Kim Davis, who was appointed to the Board of the Baltic-American Enterprise Fund by President Clinton in 1994, is Chairman. Ambassador Rozanne L. Ridgway, who was chair of the Baltic-American Enterprise Fund, is Chairman Emeritus.
