= J. Robinson West =

American businessman

J. Robinson (Robin) West is the founder and chairman of PFC Energy. He has advised chief executives of leading international oil and gas companies and national oil companies on corporate strategy, portfolio management, acquisitions, divestitures, and investor relations. Before founding PFC Energy in 1984, West served in the Reagan Administration as assistant secretary of the interior for policy, budget and administration (1981–83), with responsibility for U.S. offshore oil policy. Robin conceived and implemented the five-year outer continental shelf (OCS) leasing schedule and managed the $14 billion per year OCS policy, the largest non-financial auction in the world at that time.

Between 1977 and 1980, he was a first vice president at Blyth, Eastman, Dillon & Co., Inc., an investment banking firm and was also a member of the firm’s operating committee. Prior to that, he served in the Ford Administration as the deputy assistant secretary of defense for international economic affairs (1976–77) and on the White House staff (1974–76).

In 1976, he received the Secretary of Defense Medal for Outstanding Civilian Service. West is a member of the Secretary of Energy Advisory Board, the National Petroleum Council, and the Council on Foreign Relations. He is president of the Wyeth Endowment for American Art. He has served as a trustee of the $3 billion Trans-Alaska Pipeline Liability Fund, as a member of the Chief of Naval Operations Executive Advisory Panel, the Industry Policy Advisory Committee on Multilateral Trade Negotiations of the U.S. Trade Representative, and on the National Advisory Committee on Handicapped Children.

In 1981, he was selected to be one of the first Young Leaders of the French-American Foundation.

West was a presidential representative to the Yemen Arab Republic in 1987 and was appointed by the president to the National Advisory Committee on Oceans and Atmosphere in 1977. West is married to Eileen Shields West, a journalist, and has four children, and resides in Washington, D.C.

== Education ==
Robin West received a B.A. degree from the University of North Carolina at Chapel Hill and a J.D. from Temple University.
