= Robin Quinville =

American diplomat

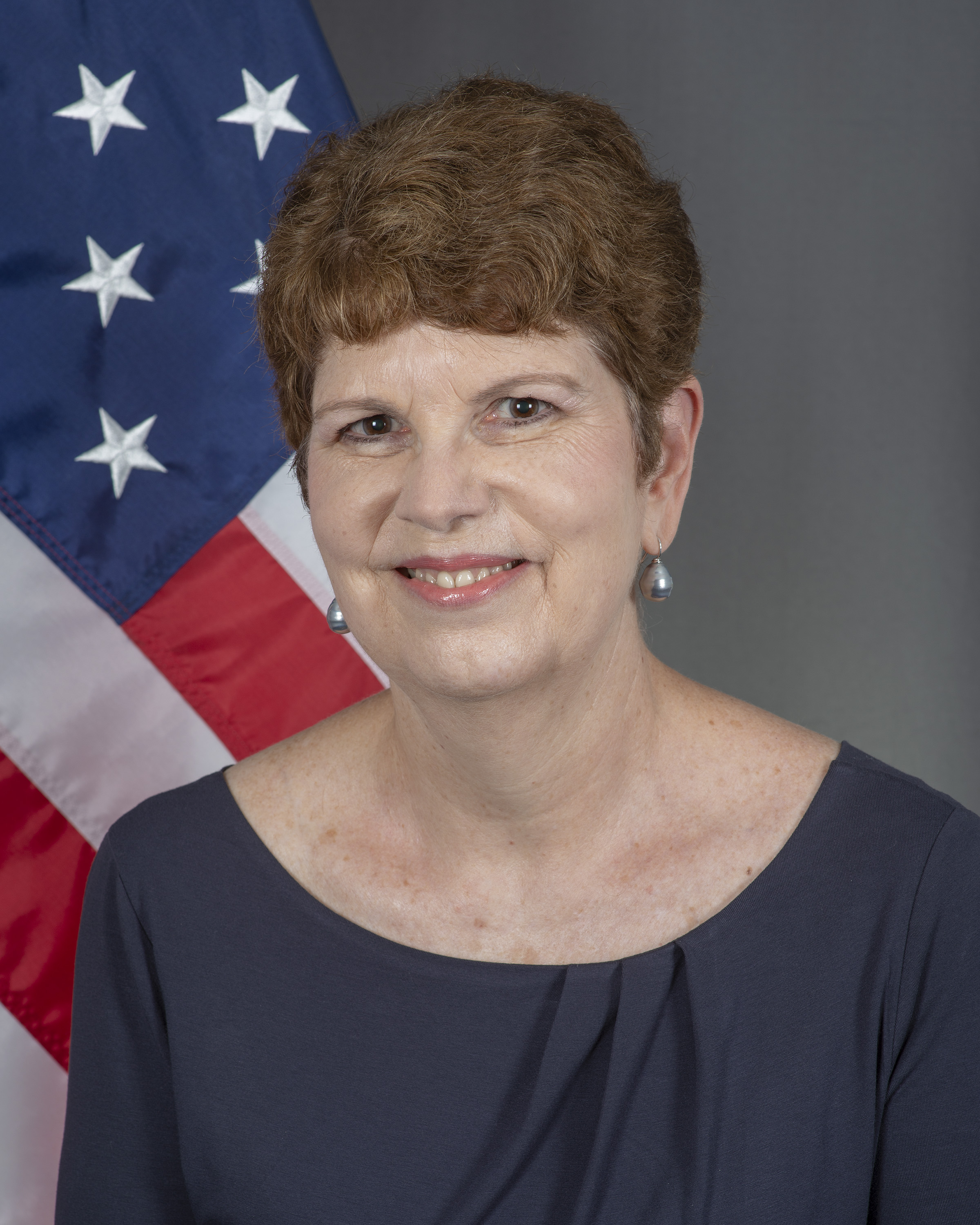
- Quinville in 2018

Personal details
- Born: June 21, 1956 (age 70)
- Spouse: Tom William
- Education: University of Redlands; Columbia University
- Occupation: Diplomat

Robin S. Quinville (born June 21, 1956) is an American diplomat. She was an envoy at the Embassy of the United States in Berlin from July 2018. She was chargé d'affaires of the embassy in Germany from June 2020 to July 2021.

== Biography ==
Quinville grew up in California. She graduated from the University of Redlands in 1978. She graduated from Columbia University in New York City with a Master of Arts and master of philosophy degree in European history. She joined the United States Foreign Service in 1988. Following postings in Germany and Washington, she served as a political officer in the U.S. delegation to the Organization for Security and Co-operation in Europe (OSCE) in Vienna from 1992 to 1996. She was then posted to the U.S. Permanent Mission to NATO in Brussels, where she focused on issues related to NATO's eastward expansion from 1996 to 1999. Quinville then continued her career in Cyprus, Bosnia and Herzegovina, and Athens. From January 2008 to January 2009, she served in Baghdad as chief of staff to Ambassador Charles P. Ries, who was the coordinator for economic transition in Iraq. She subsequently served as envoy-counselor for political affairs at the U.S. embassies in London (2009 to 2012) and Berlin (2012 to 2015). From 2015 to 2017, Quinville headed the Western European Affairs Unit at the U.S. Department of State. Prior to her return to Berlin, she was a U.S. State Department Fellow at the Woodrow Wilson International Center for Scholars between 2017 and 2018.

Quinville served as deputy chief of mission at the Embassy of the United States in Berlin since July 2018. On May 24, 2020, it was announced that the U.S. Ambassador to Germany, Richard Grenell, would leave Berlin and resign from his post. Following Grenell's resignation on June 1, 2020, Quinville took over as the chargé d'affaires of the U.S. Mission to Germany on an interim basis. Quinville handed over the office of Chargé d'Affaires to Clark Price on July 1, 2021.

She spent a semester teaching as the Sol M. Linowitz Visiting professor of International Affairs at Hamilton College before taking a position at the Wilson Center.

== Personal life ==
She is married to Tom Williams.
