= Richard Clark Barkley =

American diplomat

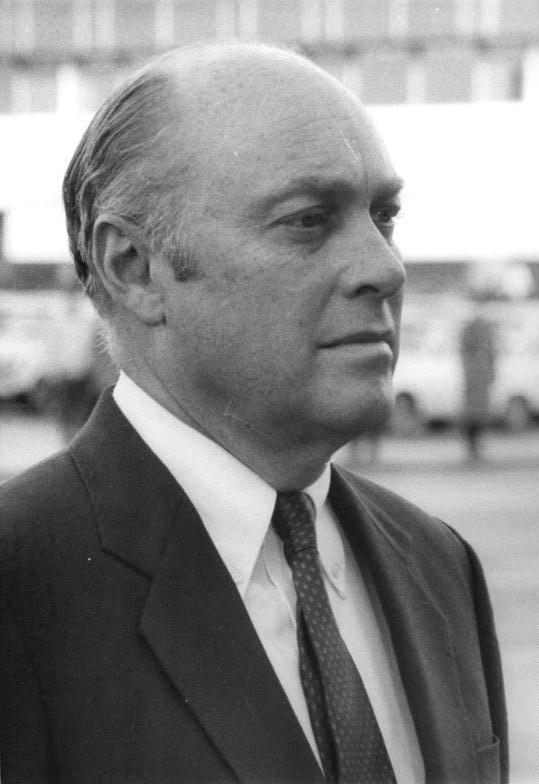
- Richard Clark Barkley, 1988

United States Ambassador to East Germany
- In office December 19, 1988 – October 2, 1990
- President: Ronald Reagan
- Preceded by: Francis J. Meehan
- Succeeded by: Termination of Mission

United States Ambassador to Turkey
- In office 1991–1994
- President: George H. W. Bush
- Preceded by: Morton I. Abramowitz
- Succeeded by: Marc Grossman

Personal details
- Born: December 23, 1932 Chicago, Illinois
- Died: January 30, 2015 (aged 82)
- Profession: Career FSO

Richard Clark Barkley (December 23, 1932 – January 30, 2015) was a United States diplomat. From December 1988 until October 1990, he was the last United States Ambassador to East Germany. After that, from 1991 to 1994, he was the United States Ambassador to Turkey.

== Biography ==
After studying at Michigan State University, Barkley graduated in 1954 with a B.A., and immediately after that he began a master's degree program at Wayne State University which he completed in 1955. Barkley then served until 1957 in the United States Army. From 1959 to 1961 he worked abroad teaching for the University of Maryland, then in 1962 he entered the U.S. diplomatic corps.

== Foreign Service career ==
From 1965 to 1967 he was vice-consul in Santiago de los Caballeros, Dominican Republic. After a year at Columbia University he worked from 1968 to 1971 in the State Department in international relations. In the same function, he worked overseas starting in 1971, including from 1971 to 1972 at the Embassy in Bonn, West Germany and from 1972 to 1974 in the U.S. embassy in East Berlin in East Germany. From 1974 to 1977 he served as personal assistant of the ambassador Ellsworth Bunker and then in 1979 he began working in the Office of Central European Affairs.

Then Barkley moved to Norway, where from 1979 to 1982 he ran the embassy there. From 1982 to 1985 he was a political advisor at the U.S. embassy in Bonn. He was then at the United States Embassy in South Africa, then in June 1988 he was made Ambassador to East Germany. He followed Francis J. Meehan in the post starting in December and worked in that function until October 2, 1990, the eve of German reunification. After that from October 1991-December 1994 he led the Embassy of the United States, Ankara.

== Family ==
Richard Clark Barkley was married and the father of two daughters.

Diplomatic posts
Preceded by Francis J. Meehan	United States Ambassador to East Germany; 1988–1990	Succeeded by Termination of Mission
Preceded by Morton I. Abramowitz	United States Ambassador to Turkey; 1991–1994	Succeeded by Marc Grossman
