= United States Special Representative for Afghanistan and Pakistan =

Former position in the United States Department of State

The United States special representative for Afghanistan and Pakistan (SRAP) was a position within the United States Department of State that reported directly to the Secretary of State. The office was established to coordinate the department's activities in Afghanistan and Pakistan during the War in Afghanistan (2001–2021), including in conjunction with the troop surge under the Obama administration.

Under the Trump administration, the role was redesignated as the United States special representative for Afghanistan reconciliation (SRAR). Ambassador Zalmay Khalilzad was appointed to this post in September 2018 and stepped down following the withdrawal of United States troops from Afghanistan in October 2021. Deputy special representative Thomas West succeeded him and served as special representative for Afghanistan from 1 October 2021 to 1 October 2024.

== Officeholders ==
=== Special representative for Afghanistan and Pakistan (SRAP) ===
Name	Term start	Term end	Notes
Richard Holbrooke	22 January 2009	13 December 2010	
Marc Grossman	22 February 2011	14 December 2012	
James Dobbins	10 May 2013	31 July 2014	
Dan Feldman	1 August 2014	18 September 2015	
Jarrett Blanc	18 September 2015	17 November 2015	Acting
Richard G. Olson	17 November 2015	November 2016	
Laurel Miller	November 2016	1 June 2017	Acting
Alice Wells	2017	2017	Acting

=== Special representative for Afghanistan reconciliation (SRAR) ===
Name	Term start	Term end	Notes
Zalmay Khalilzad	September 2018	October 2021	

=== Special representative for Afghanistan ===
Name	Term start	Term end	Notes
Thomas West	1 October 2021	1 October 2024	
