= Daniel Z. Feldman =

Rabbi Daniel Z. Feldman is an American Orthodox rabbi, author, and educator. He serves as a Rosh Yeshiva at the Rabbi Isaac Elchanan Theological Seminary (RIETS) of Yeshiva University, where he also acts as Executive Editor of RIETS Press. He is also the rabbi of Congregation Ohr Saadya in Teaneck, New Jersey.

== Early life and education ==
Feldman studied at Yeshivat Kerem B’Yavneh in Israel before attending Yeshiva University, where he received rabbinic ordination (Yoreh Yoreh and Yadin Yadin) from RIETS. He was a fellow in the Bella and Harry Wexner Kollel Elyon, an advanced post-ordination institute for Talmudic and halakhic scholarship.

== Rabbinic and academic career ==
Rabbi Feldman serves as a Rosh Yeshiva at the Rabbi Isaac Elchanan Theological Seminary, where he teaches Talmud and halakhah. He has also served as a lecturer at the Sy Syms School of Business, the Wurzweiler School of Social Work, and the Katz School of Continuing Education at Yeshiva University.

He is a member of the editorial board of Tradition: A Journal of Orthodox Jewish Thought, published by the Rabbinical Council of America.

He also serves as the rabbi of Congregation Ohr Saadya a Modern Orthodox synagogue in Teaneck, New Jersey.

== Scholarship and publications ==
Rabbi Feldman published works include:

- The Right and the Good: Halakhah and Human Relations (Jason Aronson, 1999; expanded edition, Yashar Books, 2005)
- Divine Footsteps: Chesed and the Jewish Soul (Yeshiva University Press, 2008)
- False Facts and True Rumors: Lashon HaRa in Contemporary Culture (Maggid/RIETS Press, 2015)
- Letter and Spirit: Evasion, Avoidance, and Workarounds in the Halakhic System (Maggid/RIETS Press, 2024)

He has also authored multiple volumes of Binah BaSefarim, a series of analytical Talmudic essays.
