= List of ambassadors of the United States to East Germany =

Ambassador of the United States to East Germany
- Seal of the United States Department of State
- Inaugural holder: Brandon Grove as Chargé d'Affaires
- Formation: December 9, 1974
- Final holder: Richard Clark Barkley
- Abolished: October 2, 1990

The United States had diplomatic relations with the nation of East Germany (the German Democratic Republic) from 1974 to 1990.

Listed below are the head U.S. diplomatic agents to East Germany, their diplomatic rank, and the effective start and end of their service in East Germany.

== List of United States ambassadors to East Germany ==
=== Heads of the U.S. Embassy at East Berlin (1974–1990) ===
Name and title	Portrait	Presentation of credentials	Termination of mission
John Sherman Cooper, Ambassador		December 20, 1974	September 28, 1976
David B. Bolen, Ambassador		August 22, 1977	June 20, 1980
Herbert S. Okun, Ambassador		August 20, 1980	January 13, 1983
Rozanne L. Ridgway, Ambassador		January 26, 1983	July 13, 1985
Francis J. Meehan, Ambassador		September 16, 1985	November 30, 1988
Richard Clark Barkley, Ambassador		December 19, 1988	October 3, 1990

== See also ==
- East Germany–United States relations
- Embassy of the United States, Berlin
- Embassy of Germany, Washington, D.C.
- Ambassadors of East Germany to the United States
- Germany–United States relations
- Ambassadors of Germany to the United States
- Ambassadors of the United States to Germany
