= Dimitri Simes =

Russian-American political scientist, author

Dimitri K. Simes
- Дмитрий Саймс
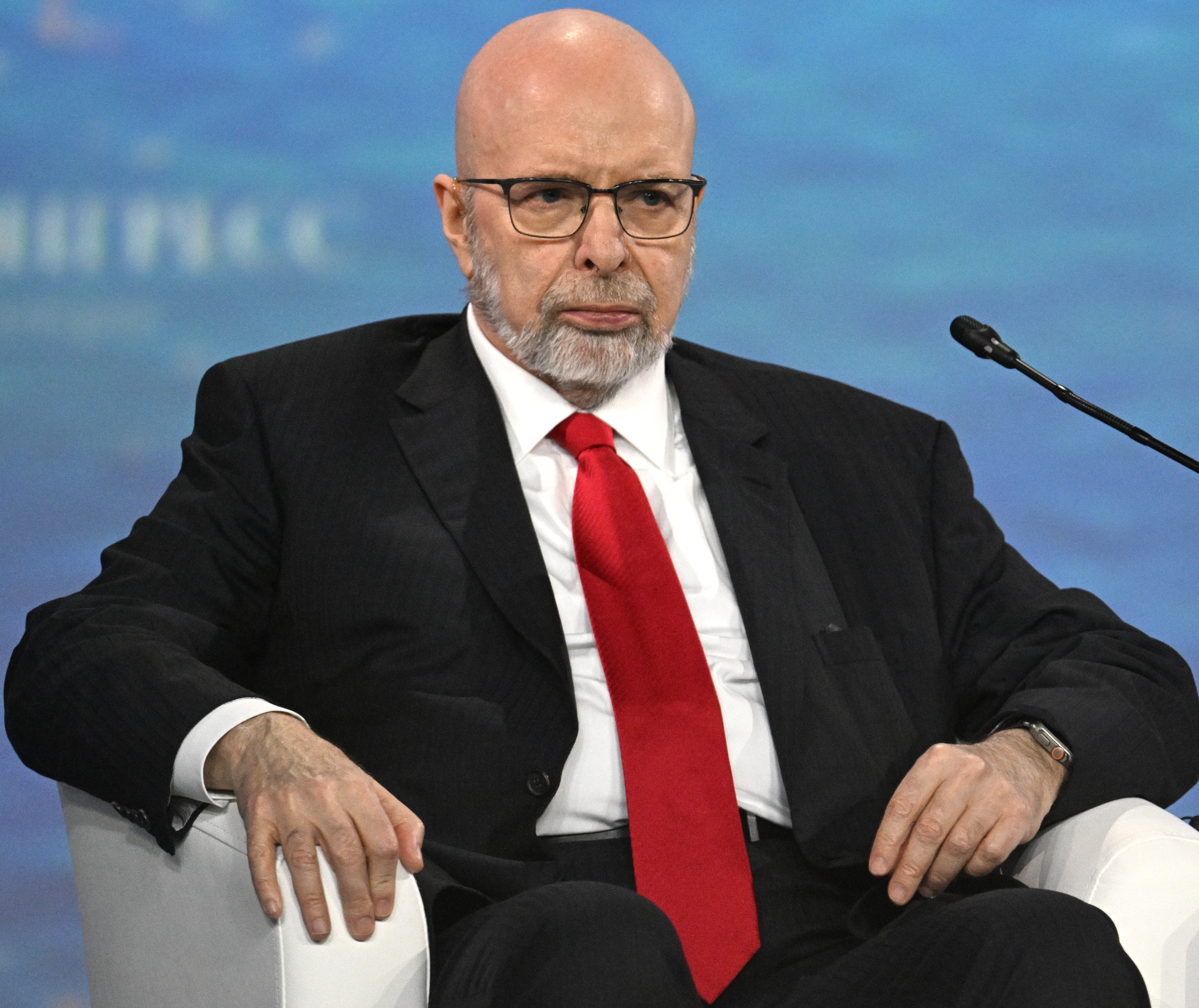
- Simes in 2023
- Born: Дмитрий Константинович Симис; October 29, 1947 (age 78); Moscow, Russian SFSR, Soviet Union
- Education: Moscow State University
- Spouse: Anastasia Simes

Dimitri Konstantinovich Simes (Russian: Дмитрий Константинович Саймс; born October 29, 1947) is a Russian-American author, editor, and political pundit. He is the former president and CEO of The Center for the National Interest, where he served from 1994 to 2022.

== Biography ==
Simes was born in Moscow to parents who would later become prominent human rights lawyers in the Soviet Union. Simes's mother, Dina Kaminskaya, was born in Yekaterinoslav and his father, Konstantin Simis, was born in Odesa, UkrSSR. In 1977, his mother was expelled from the Soviet Union for working as a lawyer for Soviet dissidents.

Simes is a naturalized citizen of the United States. He immigrated to the United States in 1973, seeking intellectual and political freedom; he had twice been expelled from university in Russia for protesting Soviet involvement in the Vietnam War.

Simes was selected to lead the Center by former President Richard Nixon, to whom he served as an informal foreign policy advisor and with whom he traveled regularly to Russia and other former Soviet states as well as Western and Central Europe. He is president and CEO of The Center for the National Interest from 1994 to 2022.

According to Françoise Thom, "Simes is the man who helped weaken the Reaganite current in the Republican party, to steer the American right towards isolationism and to turn it in favour of the Kremlin. According to Yuri Shvets, a KGB defector, Simes was sent to the United States by Yevgeny Primakov, then Shvets' superior".

In February 2015, Simes met with Russian president Vladimir Putin and other Russian officials in Moscow. As publisher of The National Interest, Simes was involved in arranging Donald Trump's April 27, 2016, speech at the Mayflower Hotel. In the speech, Trump outlined his vision for American foreign policy and called for greater cooperation with Russia.

In September 2018, historian Yuri Felshtinsky published an article about Simes' past encounters with unregistered Russian agent Maria Butina. Simes' name has appeared 100 times in U.S. Special Counsel Robert Mueller report about Russian interference in the 2016 United States elections.

Simes stepped down from his position at the Center for the National Interest in 2022 and moved back to Russia in October of that year. Since then, he serves as a moderator of the Moscow-based political program The Great Game on Channel One Russia, together with Vyacheslav Nikonov.

In June 2023, Simes hosted the annual St Petersburg Economic Forum in Russia and was described by The Telegraph as "an ethnic Russian US citizen who has become a cheerleader for the Kremlin after previously advising Richard Nixon on foreign affairs." The Kremlin had hoped to find a high-profile host such as an anchor of a major TV network. However, due to the ongoing Russian invasion of Ukraine no high-profile host agreed to lead the forum, and Simes was invited instead.

== Sanctions violation charges ==
In August 2024, FBI agents raided and searched Simes' house in Huntly, Virginia. Simes, who has been in Russia since October 2022, stated that he was "puzzled and concerned" in a declaration to a local newspaper. According to The New York Times, Simes is under investigation by the US Department of Justice for, "among other crimes, violations of the International Emergency Economic Powers Act, the legal foundation for imposing economic sanctions." The raid is part of a wider effort to combat Russian operations attempting to influence the 2024 US presidential election.

In September 2024, the Justice Department charged Simes for working since June 2022 with Channel One Russia, a business sanctioned in 2022. He and his wife allegedly received over $1 million, plus a car and driver.

== Works ==
- Simes, Dimitri (March 11, 1999). After the Collapse: Russia Seeks Its Place As A Great Power. Simon & Schuster. ISBN 978-0684827162.

== See also ==
- Mueller report
- Links between Trump associates and Russian officials
- Russian interference in the 2016 United States elections
