= Arnold Kanter =

American politician (1945-2010)

Acting United States Secretary of State
- In office January 20, 1993
- President: George H. W. Bush
- Preceded by: Lawrence Eagleburger
- Succeeded by: Frank G. Wisner (acting)

15th Under Secretary of State for Political Affairs
- In office October 4, 1991 – January 20, 1993
- President: George H. W. Bush
- Preceded by: Robert Kimmitt
- Succeeded by: Peter Tarnoff

Personal details
- Born: February 27, 1945 Chicago, Illinois, United States
- Died: April 10, 2010 (aged 65) Baltimore, Maryland, United States
- Spouse: Anne Strassman
- Children: 1 daughter and son
- Education: University of Michigan

Arnold Lee Kanter (February 27, 1945 – April 10, 2010) was an American expert in U.S. foreign policy who served as acting United States Secretary of State following the resignation of the previous United States Secretary of State Lawrence Eagleburger at midnight on January 20, 1993, until his own resignation at noon that same day. He had previously served as Under Secretary of State for Political Affairs from 1991 to 1993. Kanter also held a position on the White House staff from 1989 to 1991 as Special Assistant to the President and served in a variety of capacities in the State Department from 1977 to 1985. Kanter served on the faculty of both Ohio State University and the University of Michigan, and also worked for several years in the 1980s at the RAND Corporation.

Kanter was born in Chicago and was a founding member of The Scowcroft Group. Kanter died of cancer in April 2010.

He was married to Anne Strassman and had two children; Clare and Noah Kanter.

Political offices
Preceded by Robert Kimmitt	Under Secretary of State for Political Affairs; 4 October 1991 – 20 January 1993	Succeeded by Peter Tarnoff
