= Allison Hooker =

Under Secretary of State for Political Affairs since 2025

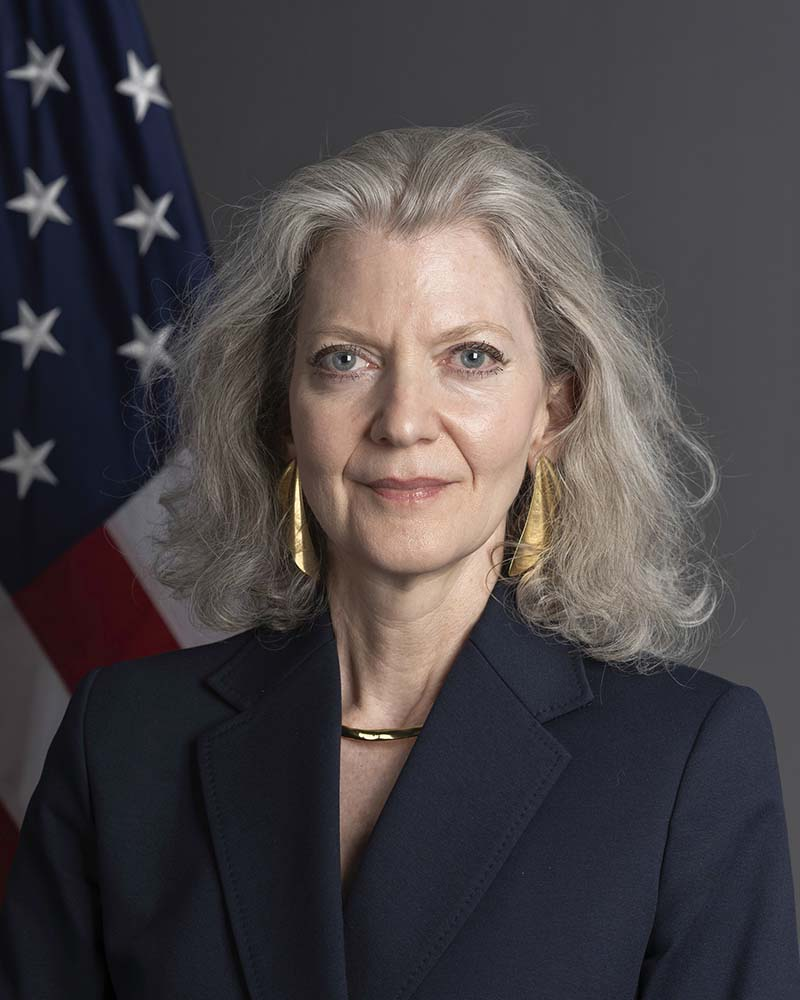

25th Under Secretary of State for Political Affairs
- Incumbent
- Assumed office June 5, 2025
- President: Donald Trump
- Secretary: Marco Rubio
- Preceded by: Victoria Nuland

Personal details
- Education: Georgia College & State University (BA); George Washington University (MA)

Allison Hooker is the under secretary of state for political affairs since June 5, 2025.

== Career ==
On June 5, 2025, Hooker was sworn in as the twenty-fifth under secretary of state for political affairs. During President Donald Trump's first administration, Hooker served as deputy assistant to the president and senior director for Asian affairs, as well as special assistant to the president and senior director for the Korean Peninsula at the National Security Council. Before these roles, Hooker was a senior analyst in the Department of State's Bureau of Intelligence and Research, specializing in issues related to North Korea.

After leaving the White House in January 2021, Hooker joined American Global Strategies as a senior vice president, leading the firm's international practice. Hooker, a native of Macon, Georgia, earned a master's degree in international affairs from George Washington University and a bachelor's degree in political science and public administration from Georgia College & State University. Hooker was a fellow at Osaka University and Keio University in Japan, researching Japan's relations with China and Korea. Hooker is proficient in Japanese.
