= Under Secretary of State for Political Affairs =

Position in the United States Department of State

United States Under Secretary of State for Political Affairs
- Seal of the United States Department of State

- Flag of the United States Department of State

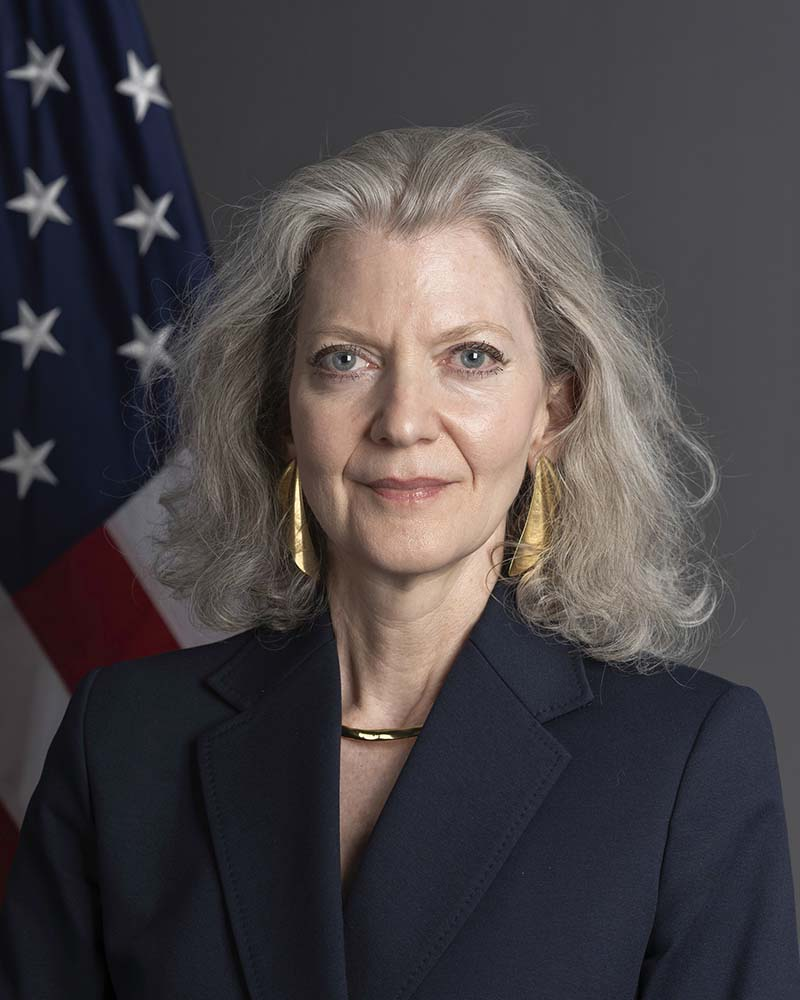
- Incumbent; Allison Hooker since June 5, 2025
- United States Department of State
- Style: Madam Under Secretary
- Reports to: The secretary of state
- Appointer: The president with Senate advice and consent
- Term length: Appointed
- Inaugural holder: Robert D. Murphy
- Formation: August 1959
- Salary: $183,300 annually (Executive Schedule III)
- Website: state.gov/p

The under secretary of state for political affairs is currently the fourth-ranking position in the United States Department of State, after the secretary, the deputy secretary, and the deputy secretary of state for management and resources.

The under secretary of state for political affairs is a career Foreign Service officer. This makes the officeholder the highest-ranking member of the United States Foreign Service. The under secretary serves as the day-to-day manager of overall regional and bilateral policy issues, and oversees the bureaus for Africa, East Asia and the Pacific, Europe and Eurasia, the Near East, South and Central Asia, the Western Hemisphere and International Organizations. The under secretary is advised by assistant secretaries of the geographic bureaus, who guide U.S. diplomatic missions within their regional jurisdiction.

The political bureaus were first overseen in 1949 by a deputy under secretary for political affairs. Prior to the creation of the position of under secretary of state for political affairs in August 1959, the deputy under secretary for political affairs assisted the secretary and under secretary of state in the formulation and conduct of U.S. foreign policy. After August 1959, the deputy under secretary of political affairs served as a focal point for interdepartmental relations, especially those dealing with politico-military issues. During 1969, the department discontinued the position and created a new Bureau for Politico-Military Affairs, which exists today as the Bureau of Political-Military Affairs under another under secretary.

== List of under secretaries of state for political affairs ==
#	Image	Name	State of residency	Appointment	Entry on duty	Termination of appointment
1		Robert D. Murphy	Wisconsin	August 12, 1959	August 14, 1959	December 3, 1959
2		Livingston T. Merchant	District of Columbia	December 1, 1959	December 4, 1959	January 31, 1961
3		George C. McGhee	Texas	November 29, 1961	December 4, 1961	March 27, 1963
4		W. Averell Harriman	New York	April 4, 1963	April 4, 1963	March 17, 1965
5		Eugene V. Rostow	Connecticut	October 13, 1966	October 14, 1966	January 20, 1969
6		U. Alexis Johnson	California	February 7, 1969	February 7, 1969	February 1, 1973
7		William J. Porter	Massachusetts	February 2, 1973	February 2, 1973	February 18, 1974
8		Joseph J. Sisco	Maryland	February 11, 1974	February 19, 1974	June 30, 1976
9		Philip Habib	California	June 16, 1976	July 1, 1976	April 1, 1978
10		David D. Newsom	California	April 13, 1978	April 19, 1978	February 27, 1981
11		Walter J. Stoessel Jr.	California	February 27, 1981	February 28, 1981	January 26, 1982
12		Lawrence Eagleburger	Florida	February 11, 1982	February 12, 1982	May 1, 1984
13		Michael Armacost	Maryland	May 17, 1984	May 18, 1984	March 2, 1989
14		Robert M. Kimmitt	Virginia	March 2, 1989	March 2, 1989	August 23, 1991
15		Arnold Kanter	Virginia	October 4, 1991	October 4, 1991	January 20, 1993
16		Peter Tarnoff	New York	March 11, 1993	March 11, 1993	April 18, 1997
17		Thomas R. Pickering	New Jersey	May 27, 1997	May 27, 1997	December 31, 2000
18		Marc Grossman	Virginia	March 23, 2001	March 26, 2001	February 25, 2005
19		R. Nicholas Burns	Massachusetts	March 18, 2005	March 18, 2005	February 29, 2008
20		William J. Burns	Maryland	February 29, 2008	May 13, 2008	July 28, 2011
-		Thomas A. Shannon Jr. Acting	Minnesota	July 28, 2011	July 28, 2011	September 21, 2011
21		Wendy Sherman	Maryland	September 21, 2011	September 21, 2011	October 2, 2015
22		Thomas A. Shannon Jr.	Minnesota	February 2, 2016	February 12, 2016	June 4, 2018
-		Stephen Mull; Acting	Pennsylvania	June 5, 2018	June 5, 2018	August 29, 2018
23		David Hale	New Jersey	August 28, 2018	August 30, 2018	May 3, 2021
24		Victoria Nuland	Virginia	April 29, 2021	May 3, 2021	March 22, 2024
-		John R. Bass; Acting	New York	March 22, 2024	March 22, 2024	January 20, 2025
-		Lisa D. Kenna; Acting	Vermont	January 20, 2025	January 20, 2025	June 5, 2025
25		Allison Hooker	Georgia	June 3, 2025	June 5, 2025	Incumbent
