= Robert M. Kimmitt =

American politician (born 1947)

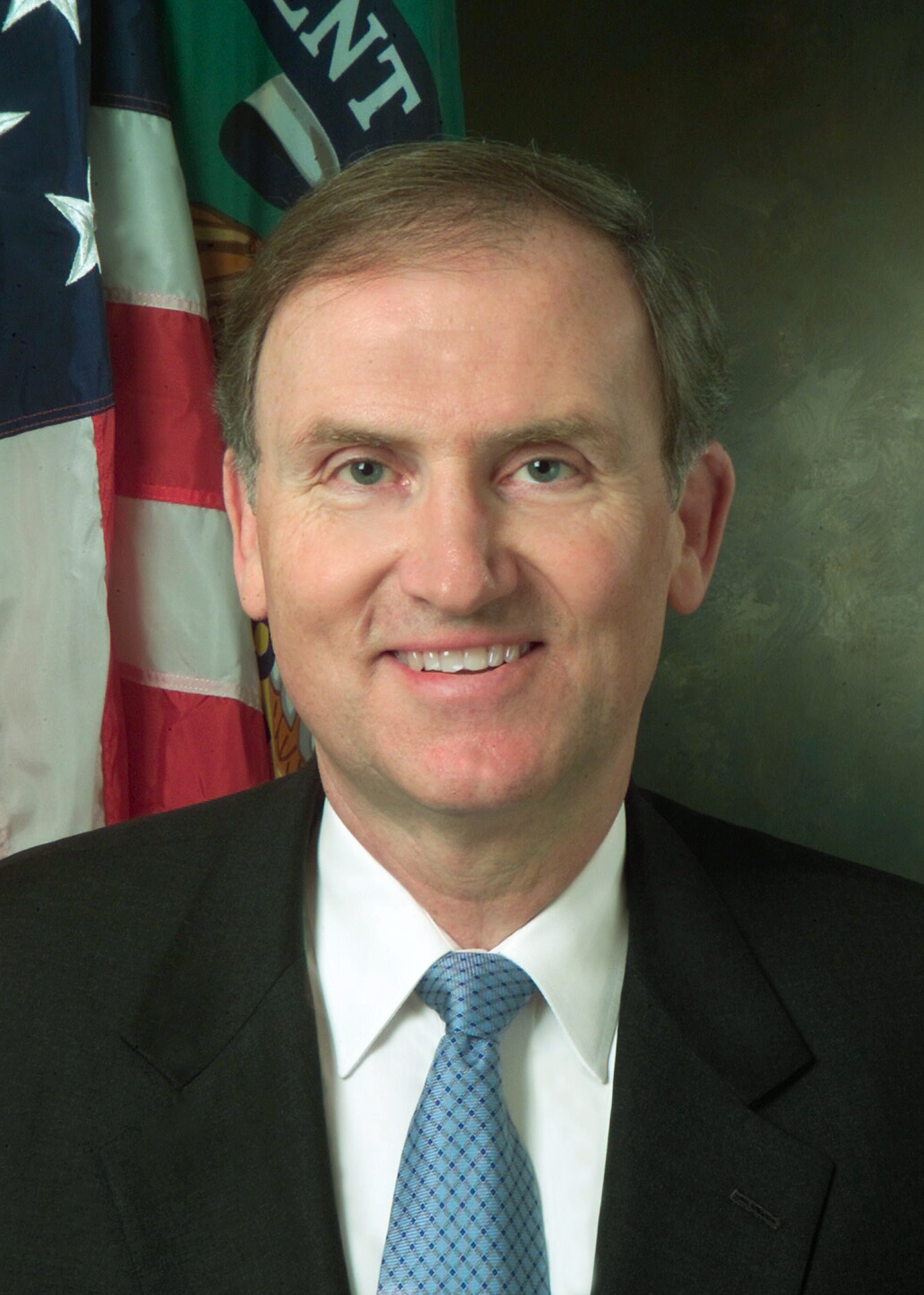

United States Secretary of the Treasury
- Acting
- In office June 30, 2006 – July 10, 2006
- President: George W. Bush
- Preceded by: John W. Snow
- Succeeded by: Henry Paulson

United States Deputy Secretary of the Treasury
- In office August 16, 2005 – January 20, 2009
- President: George W. Bush
- Preceded by: Samuel Bodman
- Succeeded by: Neal S. Wolin

United States Ambassador to Germany
- In office September 5, 1991 – August 28, 1993
- President: George H. W. Bush; Bill Clinton
- Preceded by: Vernon A. Walters
- Succeeded by: Richard Holbrooke

14th Under Secretary of State for Political Affairs
- In office March 2, 1989 – August 23, 1991
- President: George H.W. Bush
- Preceded by: Michael Armacost
- Succeeded by: Arnold Kanter

Personal details
- Born: December 19, 1947 (age 78) Logan, Utah, U.S.
- Party: Republican
- Spouse: Holly Sutherland
- Children: 5
- Education: United States Military Academy (BS); Georgetown University (JD)

Military service
- Allegiance: United States of America
- Branch/service: United States Army
- Years of service: 1969–2004
- Rank: Major General
- Unit: 173rd Airborne Brigade; 101st Airborne Division; United States Army Reserve
- Battles/wars: Vietnam War
- Awards: Bronze Star (3); Purple Heart; Air Medal

Robert Michael Kimmitt (born December 19, 1947) was United States Deputy Secretary of the Treasury under President George W. Bush. He was nominated by President Bush on June 29, 2005. The United States Senate unanimously confirmed him on July 29, 2005, and he was sworn into office on August 16, 2005. Kimmitt served through the end of the Bush administration, leaving office on January 20, 2009.

Kimmitt served as acting Secretary of the Treasury from Friday, June 30, until Monday morning, July 10, following John W. Snow's resignation, but prior to Henry Paulson being sworn into office.

== Early life and education ==
Robert Kimmitt, born December 19, 1947, in Logan, Utah, graduated from Bishop Denis J. O'Connell High School in 1965. Kimmitt graduated with distinction from the United States Military Academy at West Point in 1969. He received a Juris Doctor degree from Georgetown University in 1977, where he was editor in chief of Law & Policy in International Business.

== Military service ==
After being commissioned as a Regular Army officer in 1969 at West Point, Robert Kimmitt completed field artillery and airborne schools, and graduated first in his Ranger School class. He then served a 17-month combat tour with the 173rd Airborne Brigade in Vietnam (1970–1971), earning three Bronze Stars, the Purple Heart, the Air Medal, and the Vietnamese Cross of Gallantry. He was subsequently assigned to the 101st Airborne Division at Fort Campbell, Kentucky (1972–1974), where he completed Jumpmaster school and qualified as a Senior Parachutist. He retired in November 2004 as a major general in the Army Reserve.

== Later career ==
From 1976 to 1977 and 1978 to 1983, Robert Kimmitt was a member of the National Security Council staff. From 1977 to 1978, he served as a law clerk to Judge Edward A. Tamm of the United States Court of Appeals for the District of Columbia Circuit. He served at the White House as National Security Council Executive Secretary and General Counsel from 1983 to 1985, with the rank of Deputy Assistant to the President for National Security Affairs. From 1985 to 1987, Robert Kimmitt served as General Counsel to the U.S. Treasury Department, where he received the Alexander Hamilton Award, as well as the Arthur S. Flemming Award for distinguished public service.

Kimmitt then left public service, and from 1987 to 1989, served as a partner in the law firm of Sidley & Austin.

Kimmitt resumed his public service career in 1989, serving as Under Secretary of State for Political Affairs until 1991. For his service during the Gulf Crisis and War, President George H. W. Bush presented Kimmitt with the Presidential Citizens Medal, the Nation's second-highest civilian award. He served from 1991 to 1993 as United States Ambassador to Germany and was awarded the U.S. Defense Department Distinguished Public Service Award as well as Germany's Order of Merit.

Kimmitt was a managing director of Lehman Brothers from 1993 to 1997. He was a partner at Wilmer, Cutler & Pickering from 1997 to 2000. Kimmitt was Vice Chairman and President of Commerce One, a software company headquartered in the San Francisco Bay area. Robert Kimmitt was Chairman of the International Advisory Council of Time Warner, where he had served from July 2001 to February 2005 as Executive Vice President, Global Public Policy. From March through August 2005, he was also Senior International Counsel in the law firm of Wilmer Cutler Pickering Hale and Dorr.

Ambassador Kimmitt was Chairman of the CIA External Advisory Board from 2017 to 2021, Chairman of the State Department Foreign Affairs Policy Board from 2019 to 2021, and a member of the National Security Council Leadership Initiative from 2020 to 2021. During 1997 Kimmitt was a member of the National Defense Panel. From 1998 to 2005, he was a member of the Director of Central Intelligence's National Security Advisory Panel. He also served as a member of the Panel of Arbitrators of the World Bank's International Centre for the Settlement of Investment Disputes. Kimmitt is also a recipient of the CIA Director's Award.

In May 2007, he was mentioned in media reports as among the top candidates to be named president of the World Bank, a position ultimately filled by Robert Zoellick. Kimmitt was the independent chairman of the Deloitte Center for Cross-Border Investment from 2009 to 2012, and currently is Senior International Counsel at the WilmerHale law firm.

He has also served on many corporate boards, including United Defense, Lufthansa, and Siemens. On March 26, 2020 Facebook (now Meta) announced that Robert Kimmitt has been appointed by the company's board of directors as lead independent director.

== Personal life ==
Robert Kimmitt's father is Joseph Stanley Kimmitt (Stan), former Secretary of the Senate and army colonel, who died in 2004. Kimmitt's brother, Mark Kimmitt, is the former Assistant Secretary of State for Political-Military Affairs and former Deputy Assistant Secretary of Defense for Middle East. Kimmitt and his wife Holly Sutherland Kimmitt have two daughters, three sons, and ten grandchildren and reside in Arlington, Virginia. He is a member of the Council on Foreign Relations and the American Academy of Diplomacy. He is Chairman Emeritus of the American Council on Germany and his foreign language is German.

Diplomatic posts
Preceded by Vernon A. Walters	United States Ambassador to Germany; 1991–1993	Succeeded by Richard Holbrooke
Political offices
Preceded by Michael Armacost	Under Secretary of State for Political Affairs; 1989-1991	Succeeded by Arnold Kanter
Preceded by Samuel Bodman	United States Deputy Secretary of the Treasury; 2005–2009	Succeeded by Neal S. Wolin
Preceded by John W. Snow	United States Secretary of the Treasury; Acting; 2006	Succeeded by Henry Paulson
