= John W. Snow =

73rd United States Secretary of the Treasury

John Snow
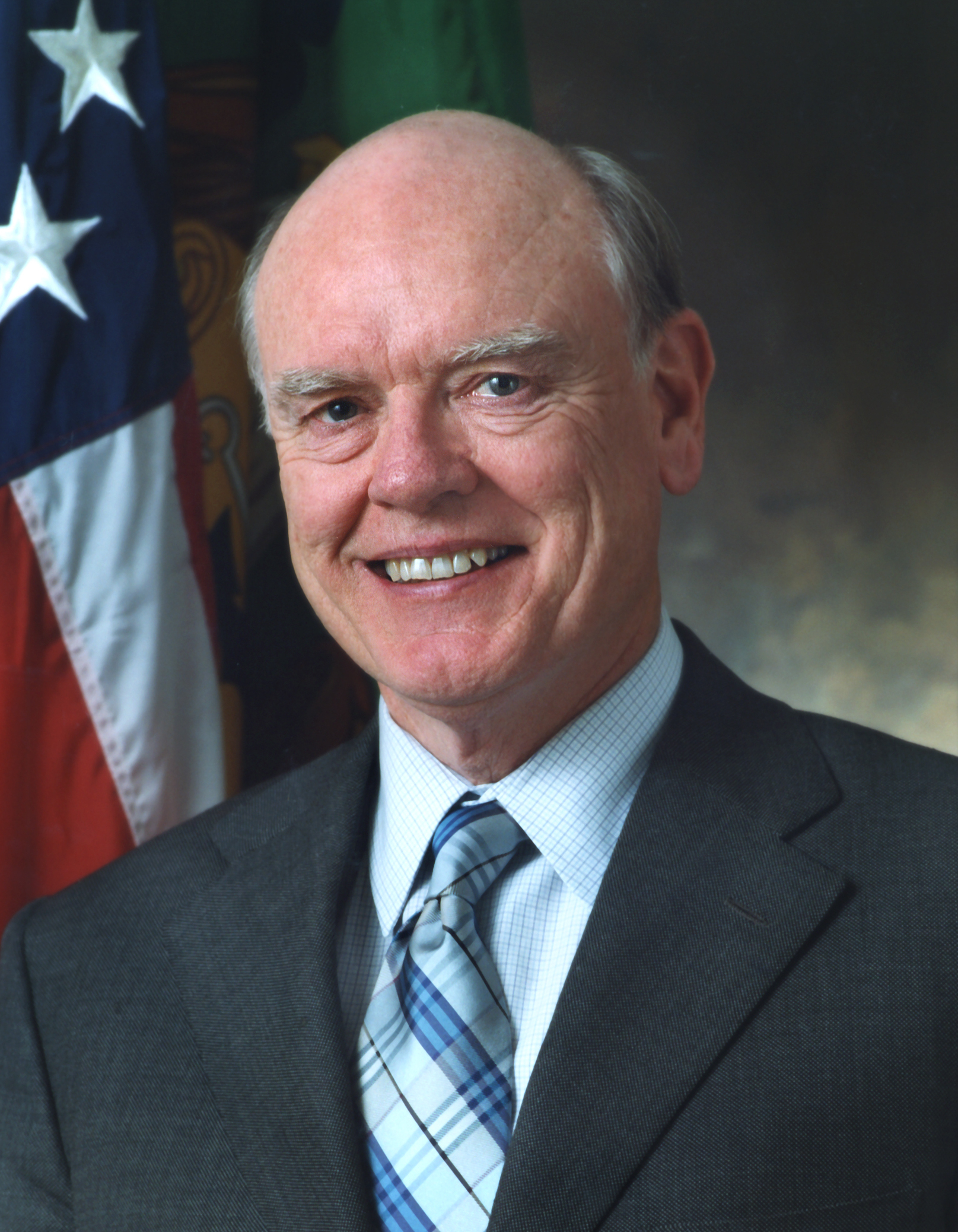
- Official portrait, 2005

73rd United States Secretary of the Treasury
- In office February 3, 2003 – June 28, 2006
- President: George W. Bush
- Deputy: Kenneth W. Dam; Samuel Bodman; Robert M. Kimmitt
- Preceded by: Paul H. O'Neill
- Succeeded by: Henry Paulson

Administrator of the National Highway Traffic Safety Administration
- In office 1976–1977
- President: Gerald Ford
- Preceded by: James Gregory
- Succeeded by: Joan Claybrook

Personal details
- Born: John William Snow; August 2, 1939 (age 86) Toledo, Ohio, U.S.
- Party: Republican
- Spouse: Carolyn Snow
- Children: 3
- Education: Kenyon College (attended); University of Toledo (BA); University of Virginia (MA, PhD); George Washington University (JD)
- Snow's voice Snow testifying at the Senate Budget Committee on the FY2005 federal budget. Recorded February 13, 2004

John William Snow (born August 2, 1939) is an American economist, attorney, and businessman who is the former CEO of CSX Corporation and served as the 73rd United States secretary of the treasury under U.S. President George W. Bush. He replaced Secretary Paul H. O'Neill on February 3, 2003, and was succeeded by Henry Paulson on July 3, 2006. Snow submitted a letter of resignation on May 30, 2006, effective "after an orderly transition period for my successor." Snow announced on June 29, 2006, that he had completed his last day on the job; Robert M. Kimmitt served as acting secretary until Paulson was sworn in. Snow has since worked as chairman of Cerberus Capital Management.

== Early life and education ==
Snow was born in Toledo, Ohio, the son of Catherine (Howard), a school teacher, and William Dean Snow, a tax attorney. Snow attended high school at Gilmour Academy in Gates Mills, Ohio. He did his undergraduate studies at Kenyon College (where he was a member of the Delta Tau Delta fraternity) and the University of Toledo, from which he received a Bachelor of Arts in 1962. He received a Doctor of Philosophy in economics from the University of Virginia in 1965. He completed a Juris Doctor at the George Washington University Law School in 1967 and then worked at the Washington, D.C. law firm of Wheeler & Wheeler from 1967 to 1972.

== Career ==
From 1965 to 1968, he was an assistant professor of economics at the University of Maryland, College Park.

=== Nixon and Ford administrations ===
In 1972 Snow left Wheeler & Wheeler and took up a position as assistant professor of law at the George Washington University Law School. During the three years he spent with the GWU Law School, Snow also held positions in the U.S. government. From 1972 to 1973, he served as assistant general counsel for the Department of Transportation. From 1973 to 1974, he was deputy assistant secretary for policy, plans and international affairs. From 1974 to 1975, he served as assistant secretary for governmental affairs in the Department of Transportation.

In 1975 Snow left GWU Law School and took up the full-time position of deputy undersecretary in the Department of Transportation. In 1976 he left this post when he was named as administrator of the National Highway Traffic Safety Administration.

With the election of Jimmy Carter, Snow departed public life in 1977. During his transition period out of public life, in Spring 1977, he served as a visiting professor of economics at the University of Virginia and as a visiting fellow at the American Enterprise Institute. In addition, he was named a Distinguished Fellow at the Yale School of Management from 1978 until 1980.

=== Railway industry ===
Snow's years with the Department of Transportation proved useful to him, as in 1977, he became the Vice President in charge of Governmental Affairs for Chessie System, a holding company that owned three American railroads: the Chesapeake and Ohio Railway, a.k.a. the C&O (for which the Chessie System was named); the Western Maryland Railway; and the Baltimore and Ohio Railroad.

In 1980 Chessie System merged with another railroad holding company, Seaboard Coast Line Industries, to form CSX Corporation, and Snow became CSX's Senior Vice President-Corporate Services at their new headquarters in Richmond, Virginia. In 1984, he was promoted to Executive Vice President.

In 1985 CSX installed Snow as president and CEO of their B&O Railroad and he oversaw its merger with their C&O Railway in 1986. This created a new entity, CSX Transportation, headquartered in Jacksonville, Florida. Snow became the president and CEO of CSX Transportation. In 1988, Snow left CSX Transportation (the railroad) to become President and chief operating officer of CSX Corporation (the holding company). As of April 1989 he was president and chief executive officer of CSX. From 1991, he also served as CSX's chairman. He continued to hold all three posts until he was named Secretary of the Treasury in 2003. During Snow's tenure at CSX, deferred maintenance of the railroad's physical plant became prevalent. This is a common practice used by railroads to improve the bottom line for investors while the tracks themselves fall into disrepair. Miles of mainline were subjected to slow orders as a result, increasing the need for more locomotives and rail cars, and thus costing the company more money. CSX was forced to lease hundreds of locomotives to make up the difference further adding to the increased costs. This practice ended with Snow's successor, Michael Ward.

Part of CSX, CSX Lines was sold to the Carlyle Group in early 2003. After Snow left the company for the White House, CSX sold its international port operations to the UAE company, Dubai Transport.

=== Public service during time in the private sector ===
During Ronald Reagan's campaign for the presidency in 1980, Snow was a member of Governor Reagan's four-man advisory group on regulatory policy. Following his election victory, President-Elect Reagan named Snow as Vice Chairman of his Transportation Transition Team.

Snow would go on to serve on the White House Conference for a Drug-Free America; the Services Policy Advisory Committee of the U.S. Trade Representative; as Co-Chair of the National Commission on Financial Institution Reform, Recovery and Enforcement; the National Commission on Intermodal Transportation; the National Commission on Economic Growth and Tax Reform; as a Trustee of the Virginia Museum of Fine Arts; and as a Member of the Richmond City School Board.

He was the co-chairman of the Conference Board's Blue-Ribbon Commission on Public Trust and Private Enterprise. He also served as co-chairman of the National Commission on Financial Institution Reform, Recovery and Enforcement in 1992 that made recommendations following the savings and loan crisis.

From 1994 through 1996 he was Chairman of the Business Roundtable, a business policy group of 250 chief executive officers of the nation's largest companies, and played a major role in supporting passage of the North American Free Trade Agreement.

=== Further affiliations ===
Snow, served as Chairman of the Business Roundtable. Snow is also on the Executive Committee of The Business Council; the Virginia Business Council; and the National Coal Council.

Snow has served as a director for NationsBank Corp.; Textron Inc.; USX Corporation; the U.S.-Japan Business Council; Verizon Communications; the Association of American Railroads.

Snow was also the founding Chairman of the Center for Energy and Economic Development (CEED), a coal and rail industry-funded advocacy organization. CEED was a predecessor organization to the American Coalition for Clean Coal Electricity (ACCCE).

He has served on the Board of Trustees of Johns Hopkins University and the University of Virginia Darden School Foundation.

On October 19, 2006, Snow was named chairman of Cerberus Capital Management.

On August 15, 2007, Snow was appointed the inaugural Newman Visiting Fellow at the Miller Center of Public Affairs at the University of Virginia.

He joined the Board of Directors of Marathon Petroleum Corporation in 2011, when that company was spun off from Marathon Oil Corporation.

Since 1992, Snow has been an avid supporter of Israel as he stated on Charleston, South Carolina's Good Morning Charleston television program.

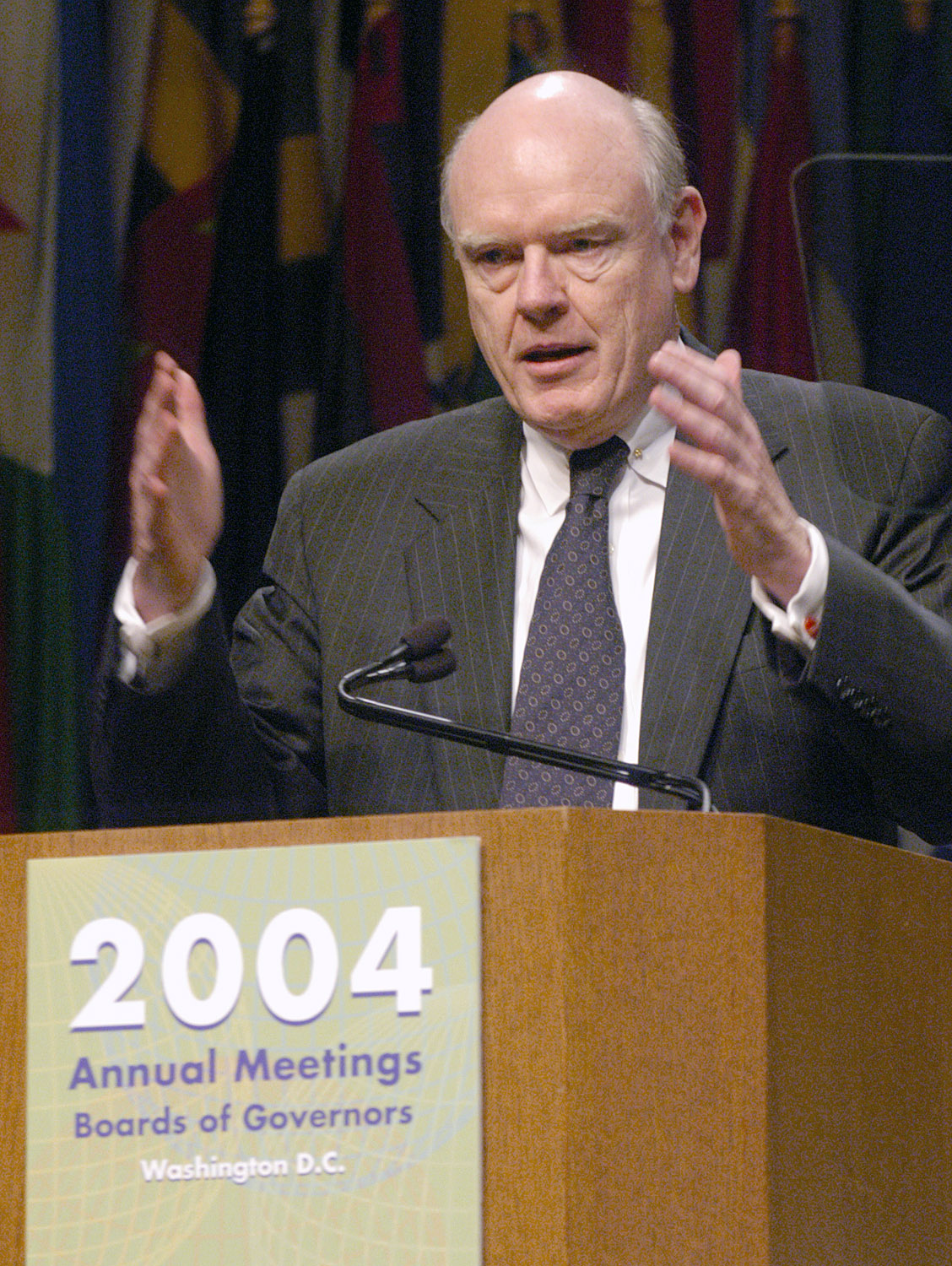
John W. Snow at the 2004 IMF/World Bank Annual Meeting

=== Secretary of the Treasury ===
Snow was nominated as secretary of the Treasury by President George W. Bush on January 13, 2003, and unanimously confirmed by the U.S. Senate.

In July and August 2003, Snow and his colleagues, Labor Secretary Elaine Chao and Commerce Secretary Donald Evans, took a bus across the country on their Jobs and Growth Tour, aimed at promoting the benefits of the Bush Administration's tax cuts.

In May 2004, it was revealed that Snow's brokers had bought $10 million of debt issued by Fannie Mae and Freddie Mac in February 2003, on the day and day after Snow was sworn into office as treasury secretary. Snow claimed this was done without his knowledge. When Snow found out, he divested the debt holdings. A Treasury ethics lawyer found that the holdings did not represent a conflict of interest but had the potential to do so in the future.

In January 2005, The Washington Post quoted a senior administration official as saying that Mr. Snow could "stay as long as he wants, provided it's not very long."

On May 26, 2006, Snow announced that he would resign effective July 3. He said the White House would make an official statement the following week. On May 30, it was formally announced that Snow would leave this position. On this same day, it was announced that President George W. Bush had nominated Henry Paulson, CEO of Goldman Sachs, to replace Snow. Snow was forced to resign when it was uncovered that Snow failed to pay income taxes on the $24 million of loan forgiveness he received while CEO of CSX Corporation. Bush stated publicly that he wanted a "new face" to head the Treasury Dept., even though the stock market grew 40% during Snow's tenure as secretary.

=== Current positions ===
Snow belongs to the IAG (International Consolidated Airlines Group S.A) board. IAG is the result of Iberia Líneas Aéreas de España S.A and British Airways Plc. merger.

In April 2016, he was one of eight former Treasury secretaries who called on the United Kingdom to remain a member of the European Union ahead of the June 2016 Referendum.

== Personal life ==
Snow lives in Richmond, Virginia. His was married to Carolyn (Kalk) (b. April 11, 1940 - d. June 5, 2024). He has three children, Ian Snow, Bradley Snow and Christopher. He has twelve grandchildren between Ian, Bradley, and Chris.

Snow's alma mater, Kenyon College, awarded him an honorary Doctor of Laws in 1993. He has also received the U.S. Department of Transportation Secretary's Outstanding Achievement Award and has been named a Distinguished Fellow by the Yale School of Management.

Political offices
Preceded by Paul O'Neill	United States Secretary of the Treasury; 2003–2006	Succeeded by Henry Paulson
U.S. order of precedence (ceremonial)
Preceded by Tom Ridge as Former U.S. Cabinet Member	Order of precedence of the United States as Former U.S. Cabinet Member	Succeeded by Alphonso Jackson as Former U.S. Cabinet Member
