= Peter Tarnoff =

American politician (1937–2023)

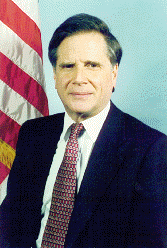

16th Under Secretary of State for Political Affairs
- In office March 11, 1993 – April 18, 1997
- President: Bill Clinton
- Preceded by: Arnold Lee Kanter
- Succeeded by: Thomas R. Pickering

President of the Council on Foreign Relations
- In office 1986–1993
- Preceded by: John Temple Swing
- Succeeded by: Alton Frye

8th Executive Secretary of the United States Department of State
- In office 1977–1981
- Preceded by: C. Arthur Borg
- Succeeded by: L. Paul Bremer

Personal details
- Born: April 19, 1937 New York City, U.S.
- Died: November 1, 2023 (aged 86) San Francisco, California, U.S.
- Spouse: Mathea Falco
- Education: Colgate University (BA); University of Chicago; University of Paris

Peter Tarnoff (April 19, 1937 – November 1, 2023) was an American diplomat who served as the under secretary of state for political affairs during the first term of President Bill Clinton, from 1993 to 1997. In May 1997, United States secretary of state Madeleine Albright presented him with the Department of State's highest award, the Distinguished Service Award for extraordinary service in advancing American interests through creative and effective diplomacy.

Tarnoff was President of the Council on Foreign Relations from 1986 until 1993. Before taking up that position, he served as executive director of the World Affairs Council of Northern California and President of the International Advisory Corporation. While on sabbatical from the Department of State in 1982–1983, Tarnoff was a lecturer at Stanford University and Georgetown University.

During his career as a Foreign Service officer, Tarnoff served as executive secretary of the Department of State and special assistant to secretaries of state Edmund Muskie and Cyrus Vance (1977–1981); director, Office of Research and Analysis for Western Europe (1975–76); special assistant to Ambassador-at-Large Henry Cabot Lodge Jr. (1967); and Nigerian analyst in the Bureau of Intelligence and Research (1966–67). His Foreign Service assignments abroad included deputy chief of mission at the American embassy in Luxembourg (1973–75); one year's study (1970) at the National School of Administration in Paris, followed by an assignment as principal officer at the American consulate general in Lyon, France (1971–73); special assistant to the U.S. ambassador to the Federal Republic of Germany (1969); special assistant to the chief of the American delegation to the Paris talks on Vietnam (1968); special assistant to the deputy U.S. ambassador (1964–65) and the U.S. ambassador (1965–66), Saigon, Vietnam; and political officer at the U.S. embassy in Lagos, Nigeria (1962–64).

Tarnoff received a BA in philosophy from Colgate University in 1958 and pursued postgraduate studies at the University of Chicago and the University of Paris. He lived in San Francisco, California with his wife, Mathea Falco, and had three sons: Nicholas, Alexander, and Benjamin. Tarnoff died from Parkinson’s disease in San Francisco on November 1, 2023, at the age of 86.

Political offices
Preceded by Arnold Kanter	Under Secretary of State for Political Affairs; 1993–1997	Succeeded by Thomas Pickering
