= R. Nicholas Burns =

American diplomat and international relations scholar (born 1956)

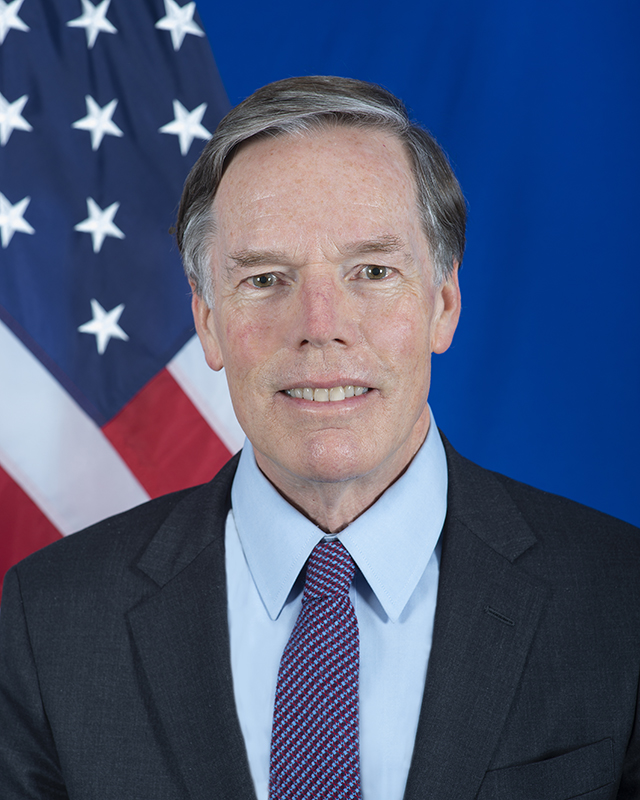
- Official portrait, 2022

13th United States Ambassador to China
- In office April 1, 2022 – January 18, 2025
- President: Joe Biden
- Preceded by: Terry Branstad
- Succeeded by: David Perdue

19th Under Secretary of State for Political Affairs
- In office March 18, 2005 – February 29, 2008
- President: George W. Bush
- Preceded by: Marc Grossman
- Succeeded by: William J. Burns

19th United States Ambassador to NATO
- In office August 7, 2001 – March 7, 2005
- President: George W. Bush
- Preceded by: Sandy Vershbow
- Succeeded by: Victoria Nuland

United States Ambassador to Greece
- In office December 22, 1997 – July 29, 2001
- President: Bill Clinton; George W. Bush
- Preceded by: Thomas Niles
- Succeeded by: Thomas Miller

16th Spokesperson for the United States Department of State
- In office 1995–1997
- President: Bill Clinton
- Preceded by: Mike McCurry
- Succeeded by: James Rubin

Personal details
- Born: Robert Nicholas Burns; January 28, 1956 (age 70) Buffalo, New York, U.S.
- Spouse: Elizabeth Baylies
- Children: 3
- Education: Boston College (BA); Johns Hopkins University (MA)
- R. Nicholas Burns's voice Burns's opening statement at his confirmation hearing to be United States ambassador to China; Recorded October 20, 2021

Robert Nicholas Burns (born January 28, 1956) is an American diplomat and international relations scholar. He served as the United States ambassador to China from 2022 to 2025. He is now the Goodman Professor of the Practice of Diplomacy and International Relations at Harvard John F. Kennedy School of Government, Harvard University.

Burns has had a 25-year career in the State Department and has served as under secretary of state for political affairs. Appointed by President George W. Bush, he was confirmed by the United States Senate on March 17, 2005, and was sworn into office by Secretary of State Condoleezza Rice. As under secretary, he oversaw the bureaus responsible for U.S. policy in each region of the world and served in the senior career Foreign Service position at the department. He retired on April 30, 2008. He was a visiting scholar at the Woodrow Wilson Center in summer 2008.

President Joe Biden nominated Burns to be ambassador to China in August 2021. He was confirmed by the Senate on December 16, 2021, by a vote of 75–18. He presented his credentials on April 1, 2022.

He is a member of The Trilateral Commission.

== Early life and education ==
Burns was born in Buffalo, New York, and raised in Wellesley, Massachusetts. Burns attended Wellesley High School, and studied abroad in Luxembourg in 1973 with the American Field Service Program. He earned a Bachelor of Arts degree in history, with a concentration in European history, from Boston College. He also studied abroad at the University of Paris. He received a master's degree from Johns Hopkins School of Advanced International Studies in 1980 in international relations concentrating on international economics, American foreign policy, and Africa.

He speaks French, Arabic, Greek, and English.

== Career ==
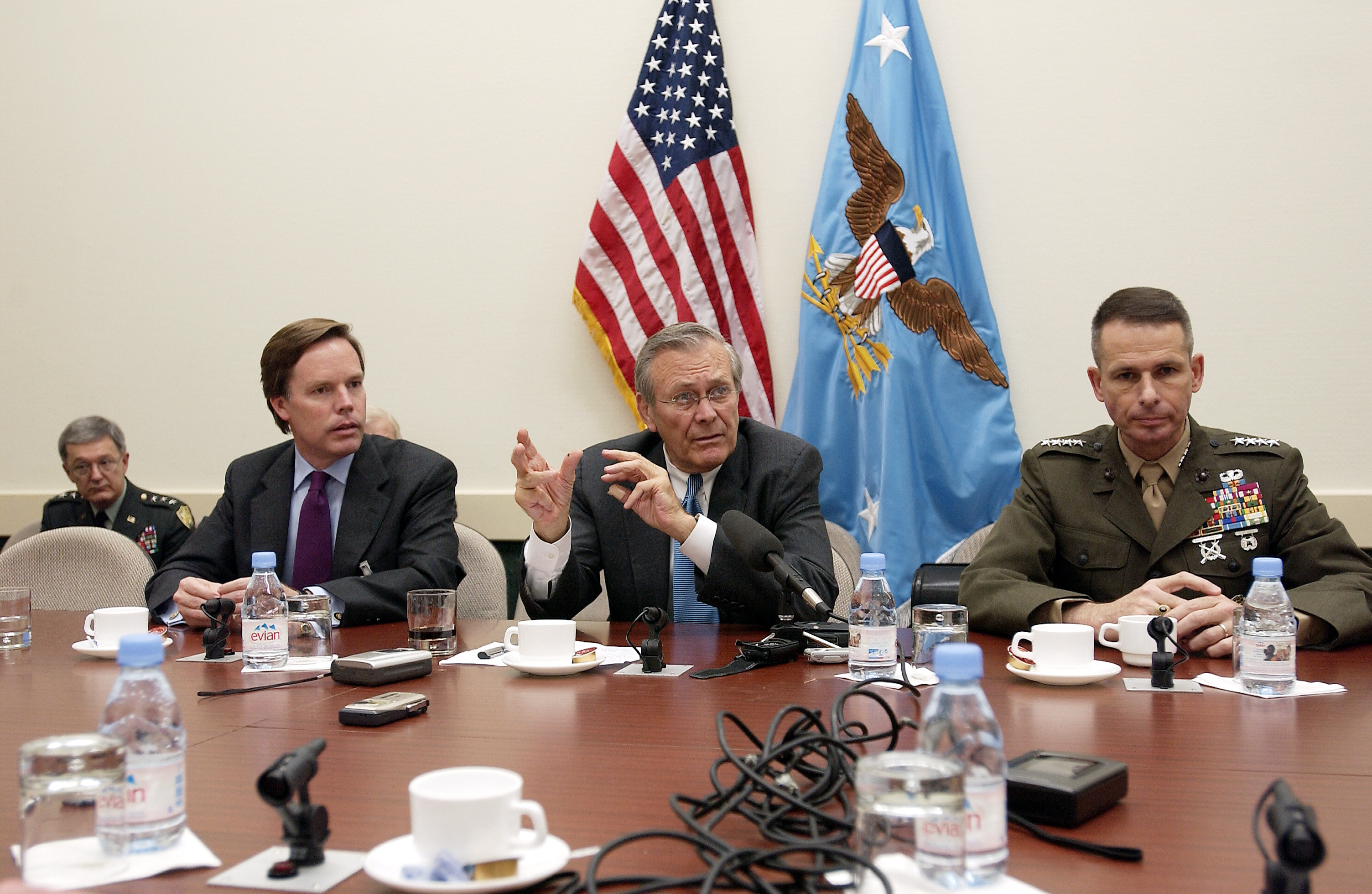
Burns and Secretary of Defense Donald Rumsfeld at NATO headquarters in Brussels on December 2, 2003

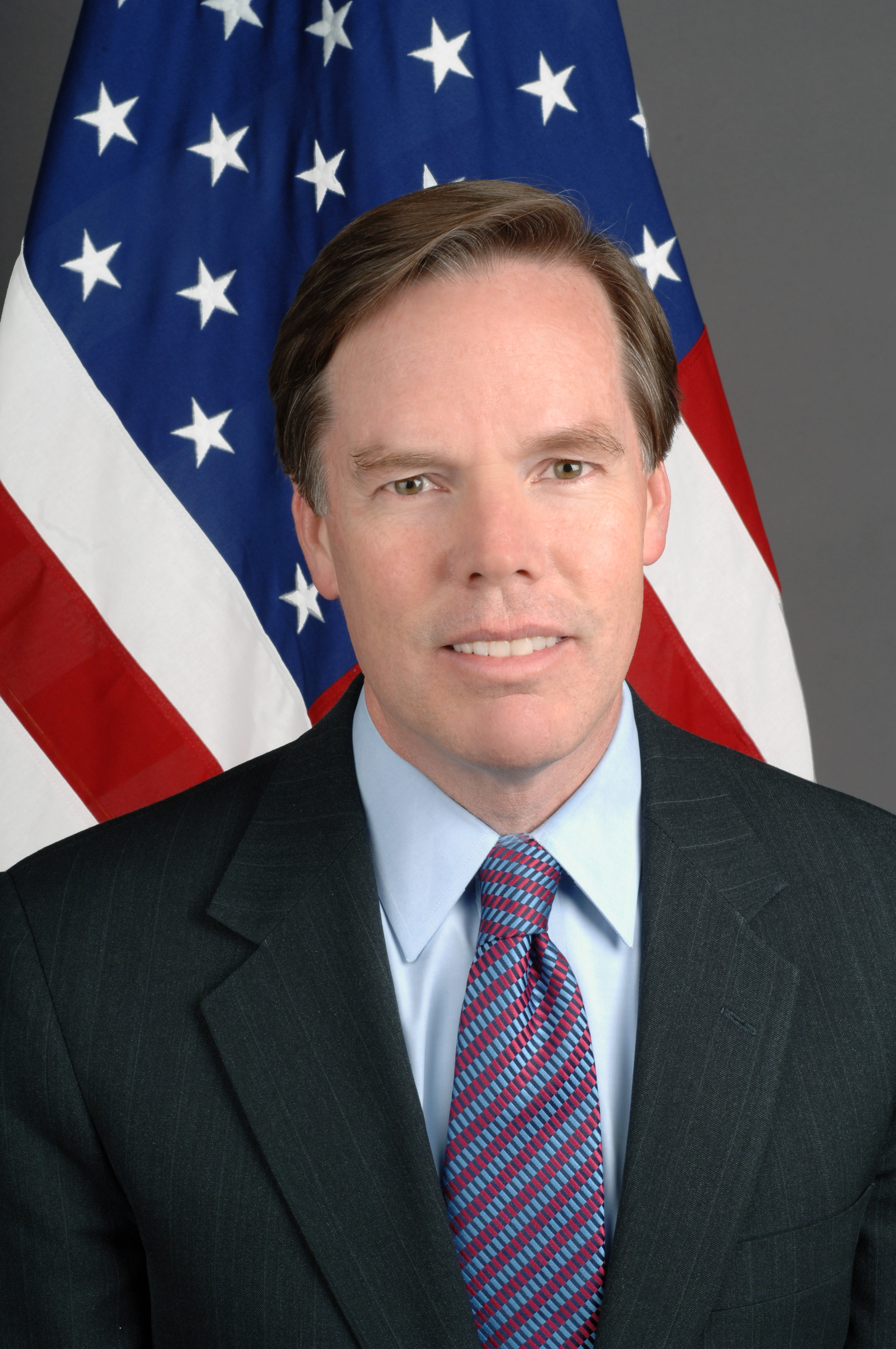
Official Portrait of Burns, the then Under Secretary of State for Political Affairs in 2005

Prior to entering the Foreign Service, Burns worked as program officer at A.T. International, a nonprofit organization specializing in economic assistance for Third World countries.

=== U.S. Foreign Service ===
Burns began his Foreign Service career in Africa and the Middle East. He was an intern at the U.S. Embassy in Nouakchott, Mauritania, Vice Consul and Staff Assistant to the Ambassador in Cairo, Egypt, from 1983 to 1985, and then political officer at the American Consulate General in Jerusalem from 1985 to 1987, where his second daughter Elizabeth was born in 1986. In this position, he coordinated U.S. economic assistance to the Palestinian population in the West Bank, including East Jerusalem.

Under President George H. W. Bush, he was director for Soviet affairs and then, after the collapse of the Soviet Union in 1991, Russian affairs. During this time, he attended all U.S.–Soviet summits and numerous other international meetings and specialized on economic assistance issues, U.S. ties with Russia and Ukraine, and relations with the Baltic countries. He was a member of the Department's Transition Team in 1988, and served as Staff Officer in the Department's Operations Center and Secretariat in 1987–1988.

Burns served for five years (1990–1995) on the National Security Council staff at the White House. He was special assistant to President Bill Clinton and Senior Director for Russia, Ukraine, and Eurasia Affairs. He had lead responsibility in the White House for advising the president on all aspects of U.S. relations with the fifteen countries of the former Soviet Union.

From 1995 to 1997, Burns was Spokesman of the Department of State and Acting Assistant Secretary for Public Affairs for Secretary of State Warren Christopher and Secretary Madeleine Albright. In this position, he gave daily press conferences on U.S. foreign policy issues, accompanied both Secretaries of State on all their foreign trips and coordinated all of the department's public outreach programs.

From 1997 to 2001, Burns was the United States Ambassador to Greece. During his tenure as Ambassador, the U.S. expanded its military and law enforcement cooperation with Greece, strengthened their partnership in the Balkans, and increased trade investment and people-to-people programs.

Burns supported the 2003 invasion of Iraq. Prior to his final assignment, Burns was the United States Permanent Representative to the North Atlantic Treaty Organization. As Ambassador to NATO, he headed the combined State-Defense Department U.S. Mission to NATO at a time when the Alliance committed to new missions in Iraq, Afghanistan and the Global War Against Terrorism, and accepted seven new members.

On January 18, 2008, Burns announced his retirement from the Foreign Service effective March 2008. The reason cited was to go back to family concerns and to pursue other opportunities outside of government. A White House press statement stated that Burns would continue to serve in an advisory capacity as the United States Special Envoy in finalizing the United States-India Peaceful Atomic Energy Cooperation Act.

=== Private service ===
After leaving government service Burns started working for the Cohen Group, an international business consulting firm.

At Harvard Kennedy School, Burns has taught courses in diplomacy, American foreign policy, and international politics. He is a strong advocate for diplomacy, and has argued that the United States "should make a very strong effort to get to the negotiating table with Iran". Burns is also an active speaker on the lecture circuit and in 2013 gave the lecture at the year's installment of the Waldo Family Lecture Series on International Relations at Old Dominion University.

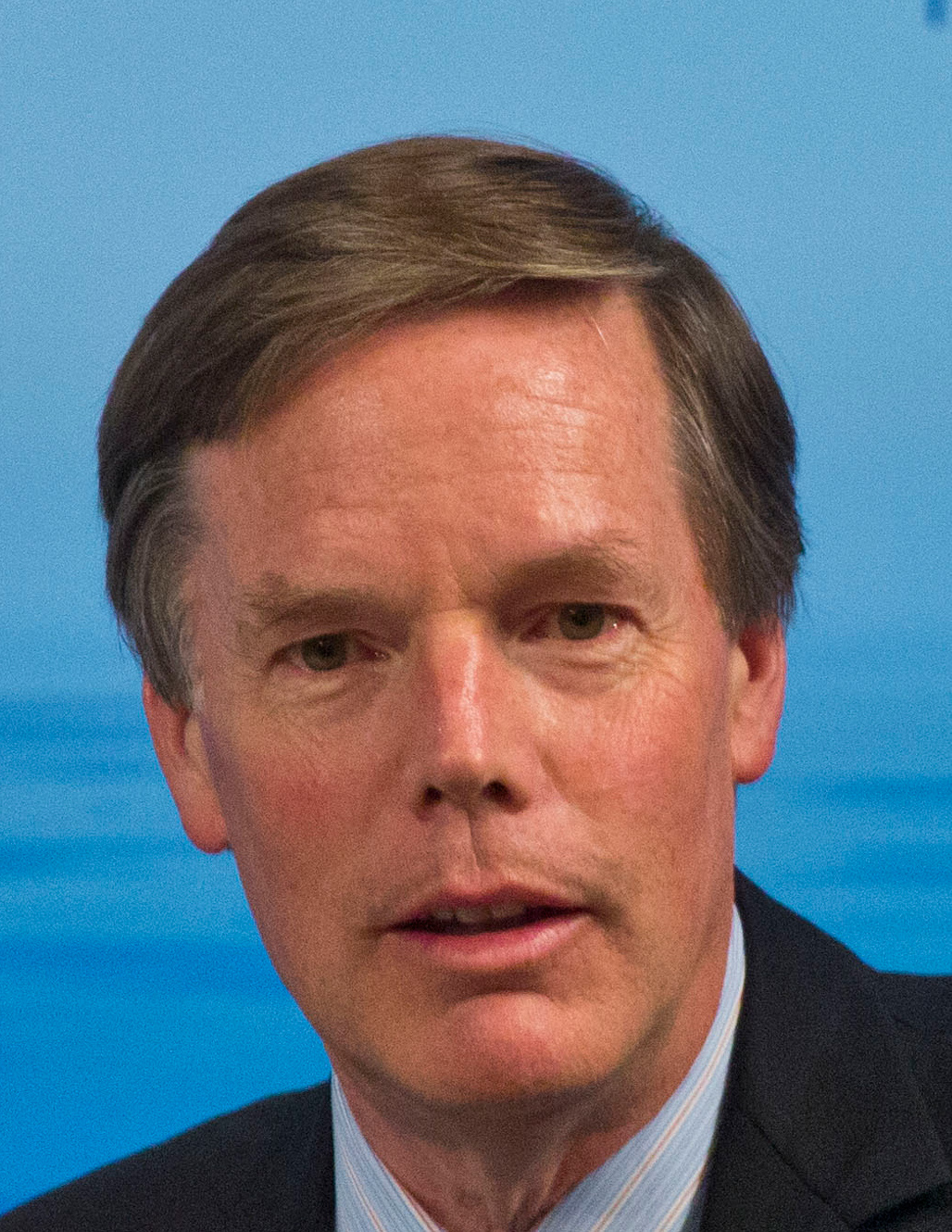
Burns during the Munich Security Conference in 2016

Burns said that NSA whistleblower Edward Snowden is a traitor: "He went to China and Russia. That is why I dislike Snowden". On the 2012 Benghazi attack, Burns defended Secretary of State Clinton, saying "I find it distasteful that Benghazi has been politicized." He endorsed Hillary Clinton's campaign for president.

Burns was a foreign policy adviser for the Joe Biden 2020 presidential campaign, and was an informal adviser to the Hillary Clinton 2016 presidential campaign. As a Bush advisor, Burns supported the Iraq War, though today he calls it "a pretty serious blunder." He is director of the Aspen Strategy Group, a forum of establishment foreign policy thinkers.

Burns has also consulted and given paid speeches for the employees of Goldman Sachs, Bank of America, State Street, CitiBank, Honeywell, and a number of other companies, universities, and associations.

=== Ambassador to China ===
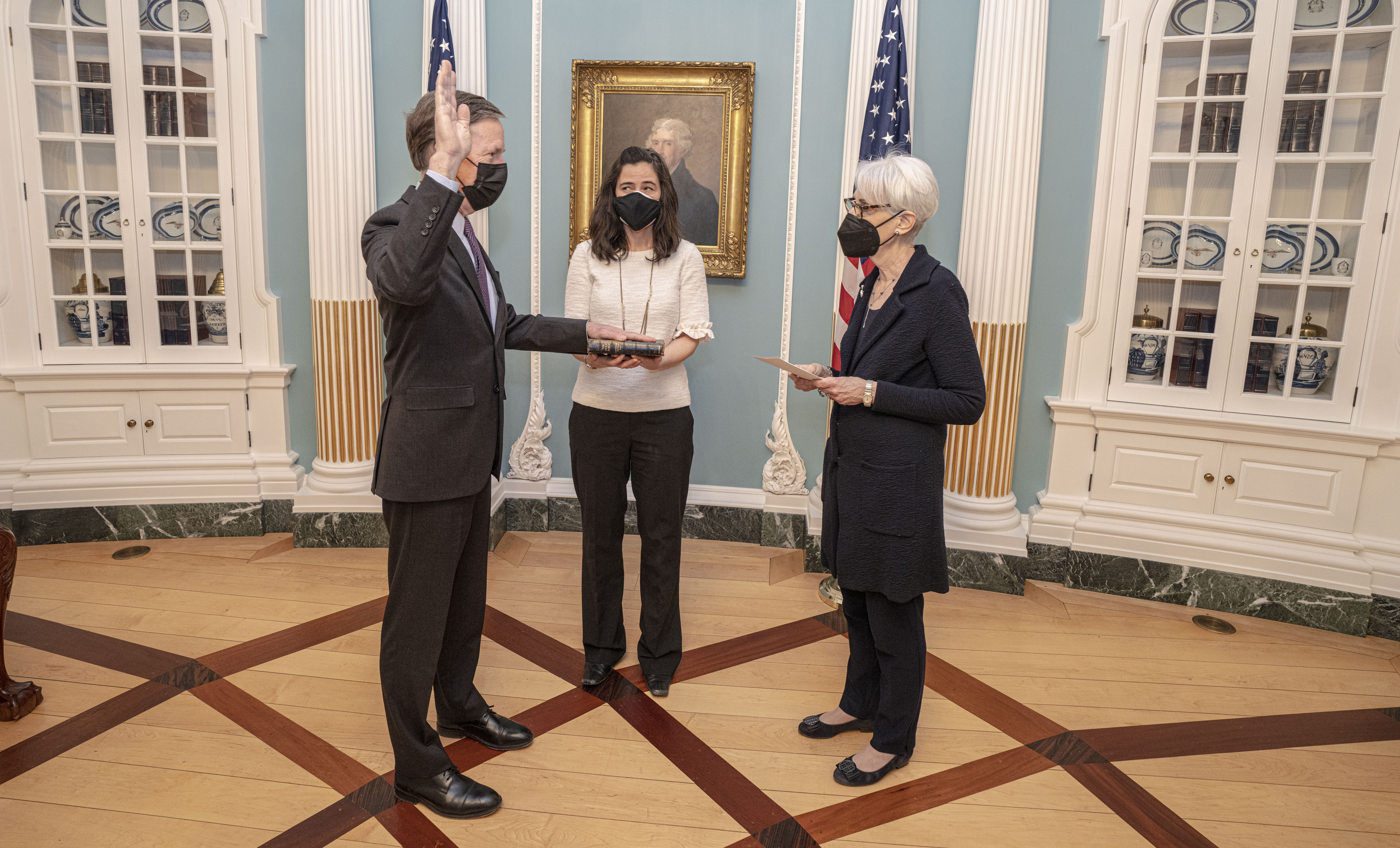
Burns sworn in as ambassador to China by Deputy Secretary of State Wendy Sherman in January 2022

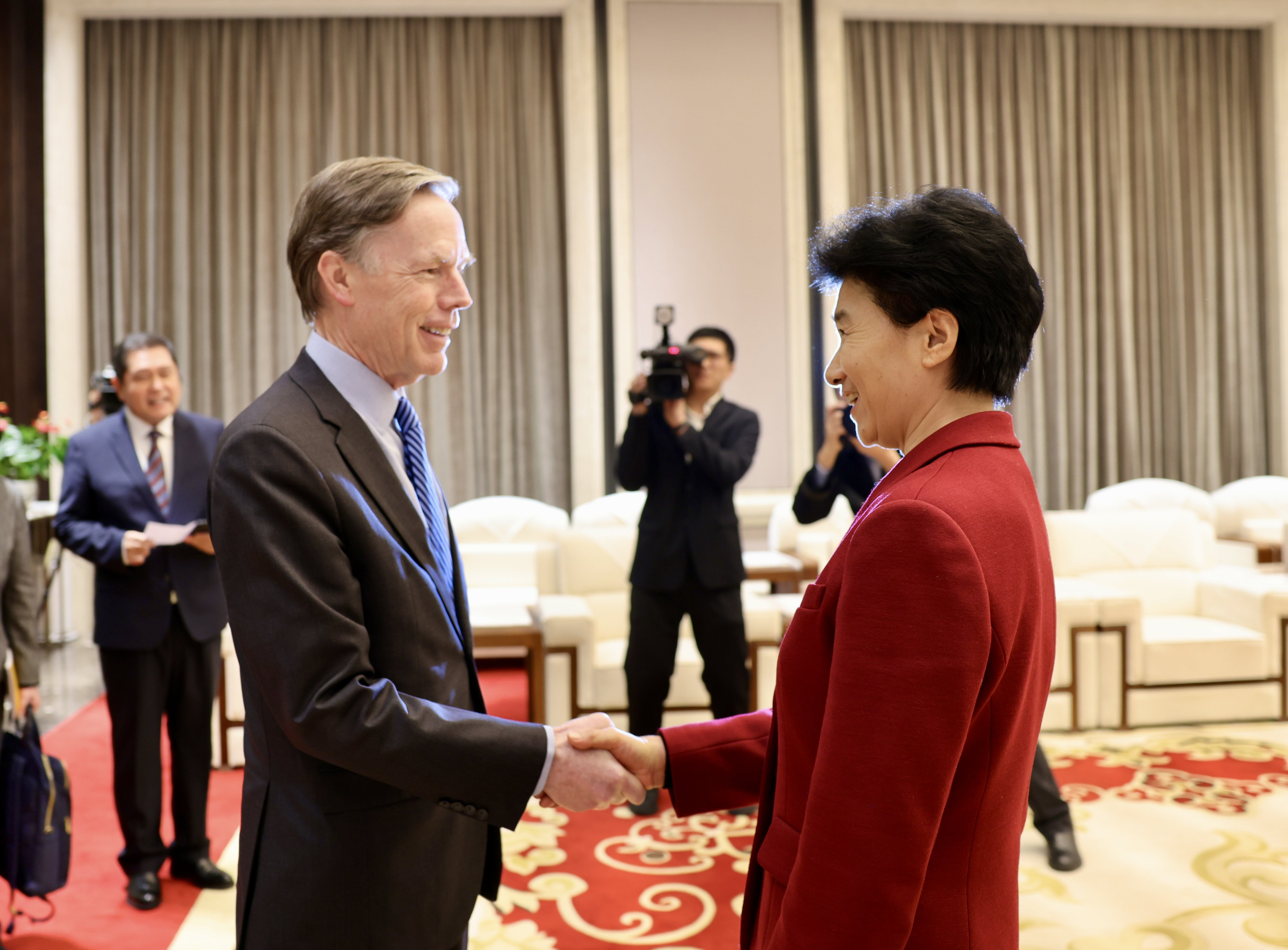
Burns meeting with Heilongjiang Governor Liang Huiling in February 2024

In August 2021, Burns was nominated by the Biden administration to serve as Ambassador to China. The Senate Foreign Relations Committee held hearings on his nomination on October 20, 2021. The committee favorably reported his nomination to the Senate floor on November 3, 2021. Republican Senator Marco Rubio had stalled Burns's nomination, citing his business relationships in China.

Burns was confirmed by the Senate on December 16, 2021, by a vote of 75–18. He presented his credentials to Chinese Foreign Minister Wang Yi on April 1, 2022. He also presented his credentials to Chinese president Xi Jinping on April 25, 2023.

Burns was involved in the June 2023 meeting between American and Chinese officials, including US Secretary of State Antony Blinken and China's Foreign Minister Qin Gang, that aimed to re-establish diplomatic communications after the bilateral relationship had worsened in preceding years and months, including after the US downing of a Chinese high-altitude balloon in February 2023.

==== Email breach ====
In July 2023, it was reported that Burns's email account had been hacked in a breach of Microsoft emails by the Chinese government.

On February 3, 2025, The Cohen Group announced that Burns will rejoin as a vice chair on February 17, 2025.

== Personal life ==
Burns and his wife Elizabeth Baylies have three daughters and two grandchildren.

== Memberships ==
Burns is a member of the Council on Foreign Relations, The Trilateral Commission, American Academy of Diplomacy, The American Academy of Arts and Sciences, Order of St. John, America Abroad Media advisory board, and is a lifelong member of Red Sox Nation.

== Publications ==
=== Articles ===
- The Diplomat as Gardener, Foreign Affairs, February 19, 2021
- How to Lead in a Time of Pandemic, Foreign Affairs, March 25, 2020
- Passage to India, Foreign Affairs, August 11, 2014
- America’s Strategic Opportunity With India, Foreign Affairs, November 1, 2007

== Awards ==
- Fifteen honorary degrees
- Presidential Distinguished Service Award
- Secretary of State’s Distinguished Service Award
- 2017 Ignatian Award from Boston College
- 2016 New Englander of the Year from the New England Council
- Woodrow Wilson Award for Public Service from the Johns Hopkins University
- Boston College Alumni Achievement Award
- Jean Mayer Global Citizenship Award from Tufts University
- Trainor Award for Diplomacy by Georgetown University
- Communicator of the Year by the National Association of Government Communicators in 1997.

Diplomatic posts
| Preceded by Thomas Niles | United States Ambassador to Greece; 1997–2001 | Succeeded by Thomas Miller |
| Preceded by Sandy Vershbow | United States Ambassador to NATO; 2001–2005 | Succeeded by Victoria Nuland |
| Preceded by Terry Branstad | United States Ambassador to China; 2022–2025 | Succeeded by David Perdue |
Political offices
| Preceded by Marc Grossman | Under Secretary of State for Political Affairs; 2005–2008 | Succeeded by William J. Burns |
