= Victoria Nuland =

American diplomat (born 1961)

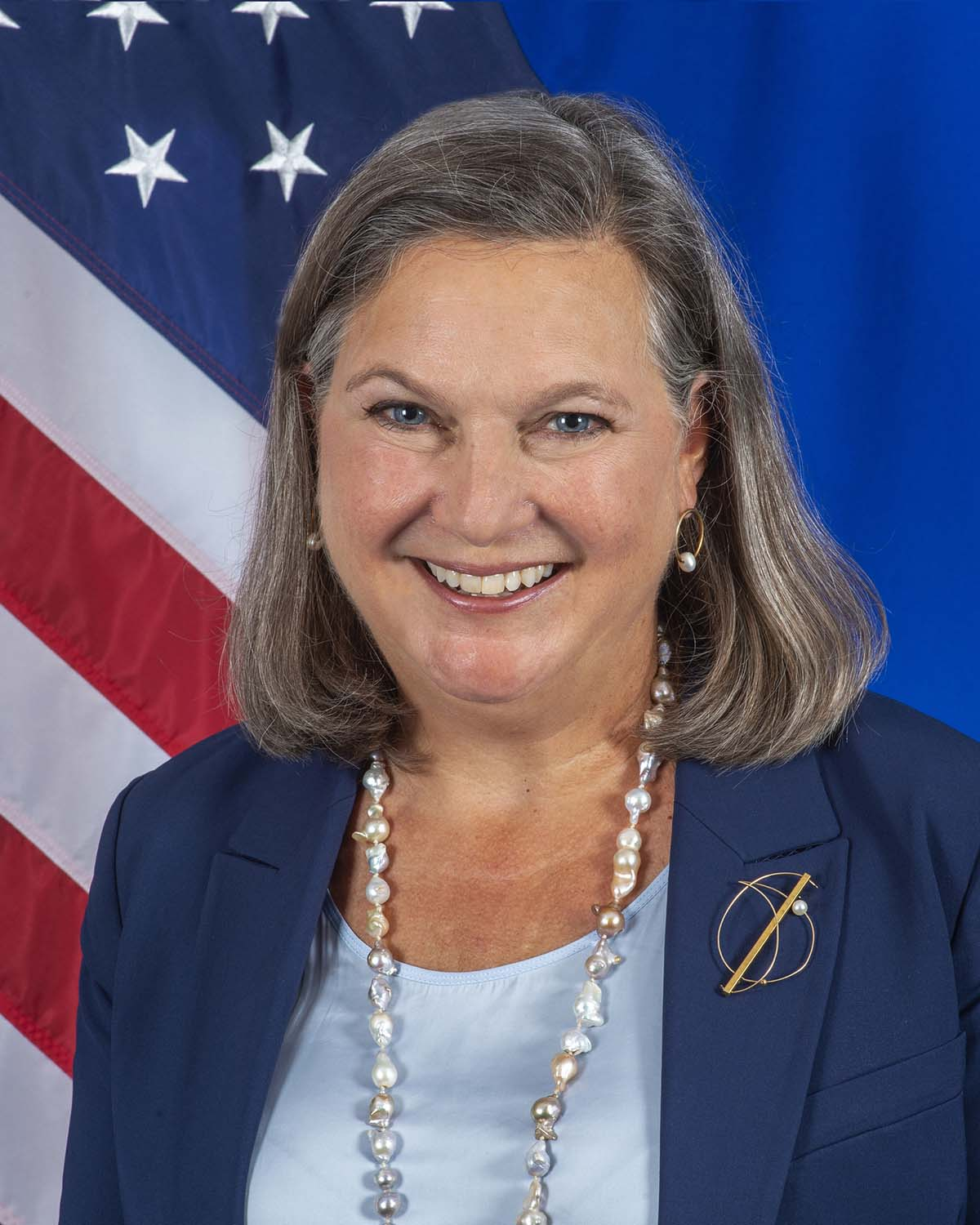
- Official portrait, 2021

24th Under Secretary of State for Political Affairs
- In office May 3, 2021 – March 22, 2024
- President: Joe Biden
- Secretary: Antony Blinken
- Preceded by: David Hale
- Succeeded by: Allison Hooker

Acting United States Deputy Secretary of State
- In office July 29, 2023 – February 12, 2024
- President: Joe Biden
- Preceded by: Wendy Sherman
- Succeeded by: Kurt M. Campbell

25th Assistant Secretary of State for European and Eurasian Affairs
- In office September 18, 2013 – January 20, 2017
- President: Barack Obama
- Deputy: John A. Heffern
- Preceded by: Philip H. Gordon
- Succeeded by: A. Wess Mitchell

22nd Spokesperson for the United States Department of State
- In office May 31, 2011 – April 5, 2013
- President: Barack Obama
- Preceded by: Philip Crowley
- Succeeded by: Jen Psaki

20th United States Ambassador to NATO
- In office June 20, 2005 – May 2, 2008
- President: George W. Bush
- Preceded by: Nicholas Burns
- Succeeded by: Kurt Volker

Personal details
- Born: Victoria Jane Nuland; July 1, 1961 (age 65) New York City, New York, U.S.
- Spouse: Robert Kagan
- Children: 2
- Education: Brown University (BA)

Victoria Jane Nuland (born July 1, 1961) is an American diplomat who served as Under Secretary of State for Political Affairs from 2021 to 2024. A former member of the US Foreign Service, she served as Assistant Secretary of State for European and Eurasian Affairs from 2013 to 2017 and the 18th U.S. ambassador to NATO from 2005 to 2008. Between July 2023 and February 2024, Nuland served as acting deputy secretary of state following the retirement of Wendy Sherman.

Nuland held the rank of career ambassador, the highest diplomatic rank in the U.S. Foreign Service. She is the former CEO of the Center for a New American Security (CNAS), serving from January 2018 until early 2019, and is also the Brady-Johnson distinguished practitioner in grand strategy at Yale University and a member of the board of the National Endowment for Democracy. She served as a nonresident fellow in the Brookings Institution's foreign policy program and senior counselor at the Albright Stonebridge Group. On March 5, 2024, Secretary of State Antony Blinken announced that Nuland would retire "in the coming weeks".

== Early life and education ==
Nuland was born in 1961 to Sherwin B. Nuland, a surgeon born to Jewish immigrants from Bessarabia, with the last name Nudelman, and a Christian British native mother, Rhona McKhann, née Goulston. She graduated from Choate Rosemary Hall in 1979. She has two younger half-siblings, Amelia and William. She earned a bachelor of arts degree from Brown University in 1983, where she studied Russian literature, political science, and history. She speaks Russian and French, and some Chinese.

== Career ==
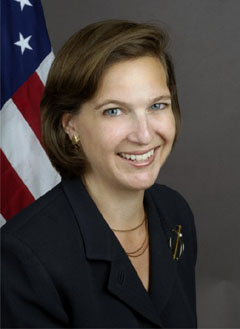
Official portrait, 2005

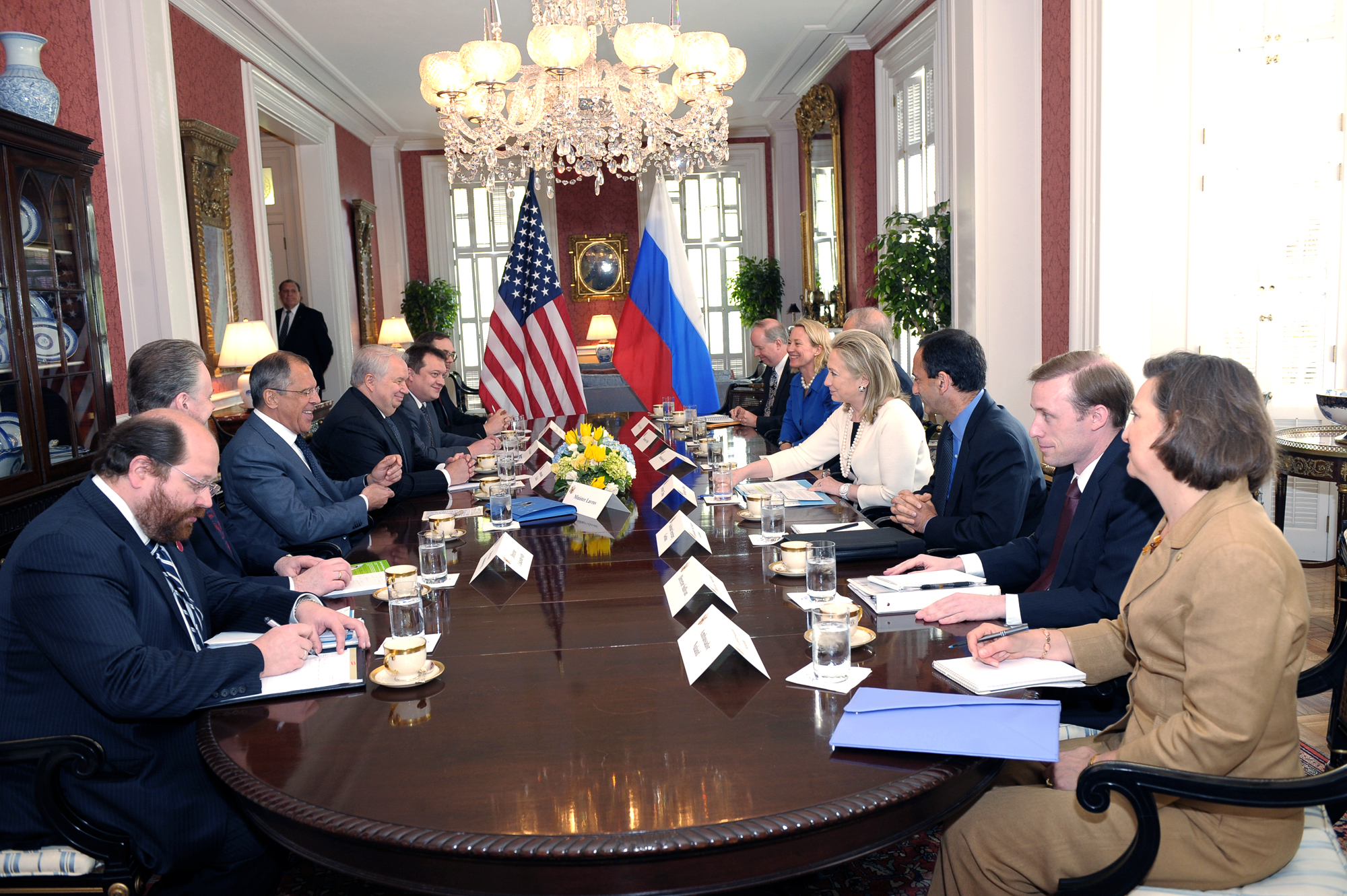
Nuland, Hillary Clinton, Sergey Lavrov, Sergey Kislyak and Jake Sullivan in Washington, D.C., April 12, 2012

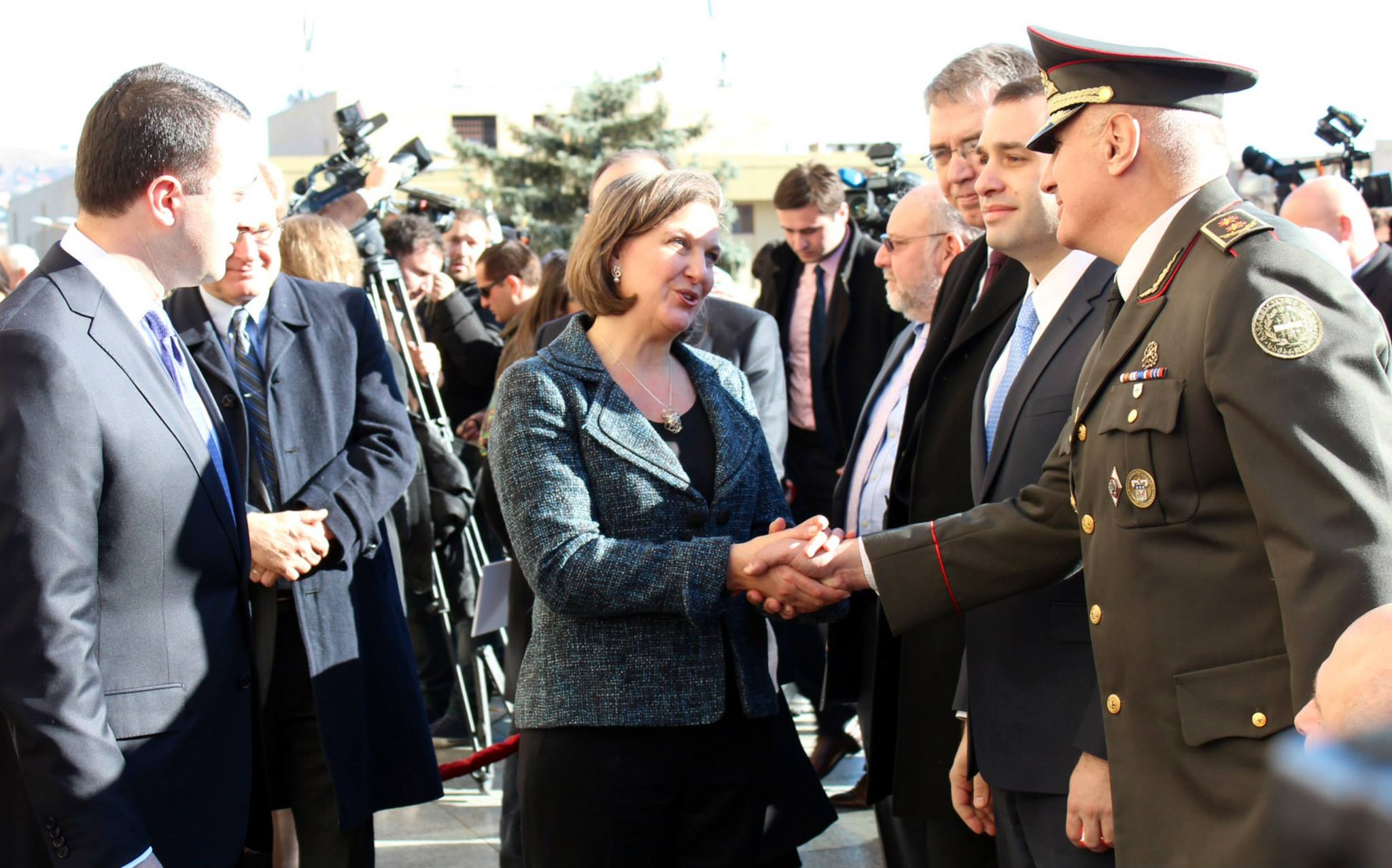
Nuland meeting with Georgian defense ministry leadership, December 6, 2013

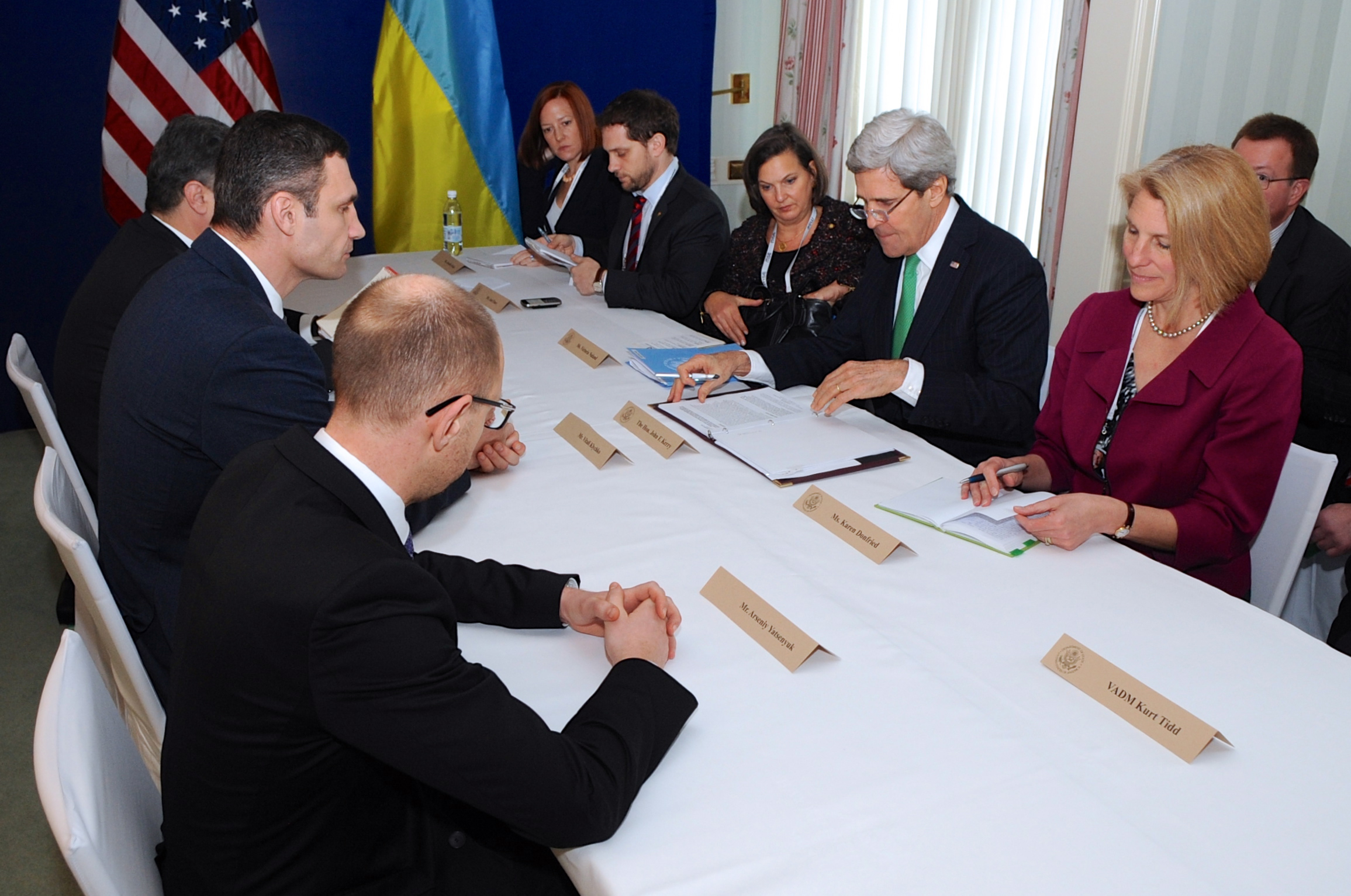
John Kerry and Victoria Nuland with Ukrainian opposition leaders Poroshenko, Yatsenyuk and Klitschko, Munich, February 1, 2014

Nuland joined the State Department's Foreign Service in 1984. She served in Guangzhou, China, from 1985 to 1986, in the State Department's Bureau of East Asian and Pacific Affairs in 1987, and helped establish the first U.S. embassy in Ulaanbaatar, Mongolia, in 1988, where she served on the Soviet desk until 1990. From 1991 to 1993, she worked on Russian internal politics at the U.S. embassy in Moscow, focusing on Boris Yeltsin and his government.

=== Clinton administration ===
From 1993 to 1996, during Bill Clinton's presidency, Nuland was chief of staff to deputy secretary of state Strobe Talbott before moving on to serve as deputy director for former Soviet Union affairs.

In 1998, Nuland co-founded the neoconservative Project for the New American Century (PNAC) Lobbying organisation.

=== Bush administration ===
From 2003 to 2005, Nuland served as the principal Deputy National Security Adviser to Vice President Dick Cheney, exercising an influential role during the Iraq War. From 2005 to 2008, during President George W. Bush's second term, Nuland served as U.S. ambassador to the North Atlantic Treaty Organization (NATO) in Brussels, where she concentrated on mobilizing European support for the NATO intervention in Afghanistan.

=== Obama administration ===
In the summer of 2011, Nuland became special envoy for Conventional Armed Forces in Europe and then became State Department spokesperson.

In May 2013, Nuland was nominated to act as assistant secretary of state for European and Eurasian affairs and was sworn in on September 18, 2013. In her role as assistant secretary, she managed diplomatic relations with fifty countries in Europe and Eurasia, as well as with NATO, the European Union and the Organization for Security and Cooperation in Europe.

==== Leaked phone call and Maidan involvement ====
During the Maidan Uprising in Ukraine, Nuland made appearances supporting the Maidan protesters. In December 2013, she said in a speech to the US–Ukraine Foundation that the U.S. had invested over $5 billion on democratic skills and institutions, civic participation, and good governance in Ukraine since 1991, stating that these were preconditions for Ukraine to achieve its European aspirations. On February 4, 2014, a recording of a phone call between Nuland and U.S. ambassador to Ukraine Geoffrey Pyatt, was published on YouTube. The call followed an offer made on January 25, 2014, by Ukrainian President Viktor Yanukovych to include two members of the opposition in his government to calm the Maidan protests in Ukraine, one being that of his prime minister. Nuland and Pyatt voiced their opinions of this offer, specifically on the post of prime minister, giving their opinion of several opposition personalities. Nuland told Pyatt that Arseniy Yatsenyuk would be the best candidate to hold this post. Nuland suggested the United Nations, rather than the European Union, should be involved in a full political solution, adding "fuck the EU".

The following day, German Chancellor Angela Merkel termed Nuland's remark "absolutely unacceptable", and the president of the European Council, Herman Van Rompuy, also condemned the remark as "unacceptable". Department of State spokesperson Jen Psaki said the discussion was not evidence of any American plan to influence the political outcome.

Nuland was the lead U.S. point person for Ukraine's Revolution of Dignity, establishing loan guarantees to Ukraine, including a $1 billion loan guarantee in 2014, and the provisions of non-lethal assistance to the Ukrainian military and border guard. Along with Secretary of State John Kerry and Secretary of Defense Ash Carter, she is seen as a leading supporter of "defensive weapons" delivery to Ukraine. In 2016, Nuland urged Ukraine to start prosecuting corrupt officials: "It's time to start locking up people who have ripped off the Ukrainian population for too long and it is time to eradicate the cancer of corruption". While serving as the Department of State's lead diplomat on the Ukraine crisis, Nuland pushed European allies to take a harder line on Russian expansionism.

==== Russian propaganda efforts ====
In the context of Russian propaganda efforts to portray the Ukrainian revolution as a US-organized coup, the Russian government has characterized Nuland's role, particularly the $5 billion democracy-assistance figure and the leaked Nuland–Pyatt call discussing Yanukovych's offer of cabinet positions, as evidence that the United States orchestrated a color revolution, or coup against Yanukovych.

Nuland has disputed the coup framing. In a 2019 Harvard Gazette interview, she said she "had been the main interlocutor on the ground, trying to de-escalate the Maidan conflict so that the Ukrainians could find a way back to association with Europe," and described the leaked call as part of a Russian effort to discredit her with "the Ukrainian opposition, the Europeans, or my own government." Yale University professor of history Timothy Snyder said, "Imagine just how much evidence the Russians have of what the U.S. was doing in Ukraine, given that they had access to that telephone call. That was the best bit they could come up with. And in the context of the time, what that telephone conversation showed was that the Americans were, A, not up to date about what was happening in Ukraine and, B, unable to influence events happening in Ukraine."

=== Outside of government, Trump administration ===
Nuland left the State Department in January 2017, amid the departure of many other career officials during the early days of the first Trump administration.

On January 24, 2018, The Washington Post published an interview with Nuland where she opined on the work of President Donald Trump and Secretary of State Rex Tillerson. She described an exodus of career foreign service officials and dysfunction within the State Department, and stated that the American judiciary and media were under assault. Nuland also decried a trend towards American isolationism, stating: "When we withdraw and say it's every nation for itself, you open the door for countries dissatisfied with their territorial position and influence in the international system—or with the system itself." She encouraged whole-government responses to international issues, stating, "Military leaders would be the first to say military solutions alone result in more and longer military entanglements. The role of American diplomats and political leaders is to work concurrently with the military to bring to bear all of the political tools we have."

In January 2018, the Trump administration began new high-level engagements with Russian government officials by scheduling a meeting between Russia's top general Valery Gerasimov and the NATO Supreme Allied Commander Europe, General Curtis Scaparrotti. Nuland stated, "These channels are especially vital at a time when relations at the leader level are so unpredictable." She said Scaparrotti was "uniquely positioned" to address concerns about Russia's "ongoing military role in Ukraine, its INF treaty violations, its active measures to undermine Transatlantic democracies and the other strategic tensions that are driving the US and its allies to take stronger deterrent measures."

It was also in January 2018 that Nuland was named CEO of the Center for a New American Security (CNAS), a think tank and lobbying organisation in Washington, D.C., specializing in United States national security issues, with strong ties to the Democratic Party. The organization's top donors included major U.S. defense industry companies like Northrop Grumman Aerospace Systems, The Boeing Company, Lockheed Martin Corporation and Raytheon Company, among others.

=== Biden administration ===
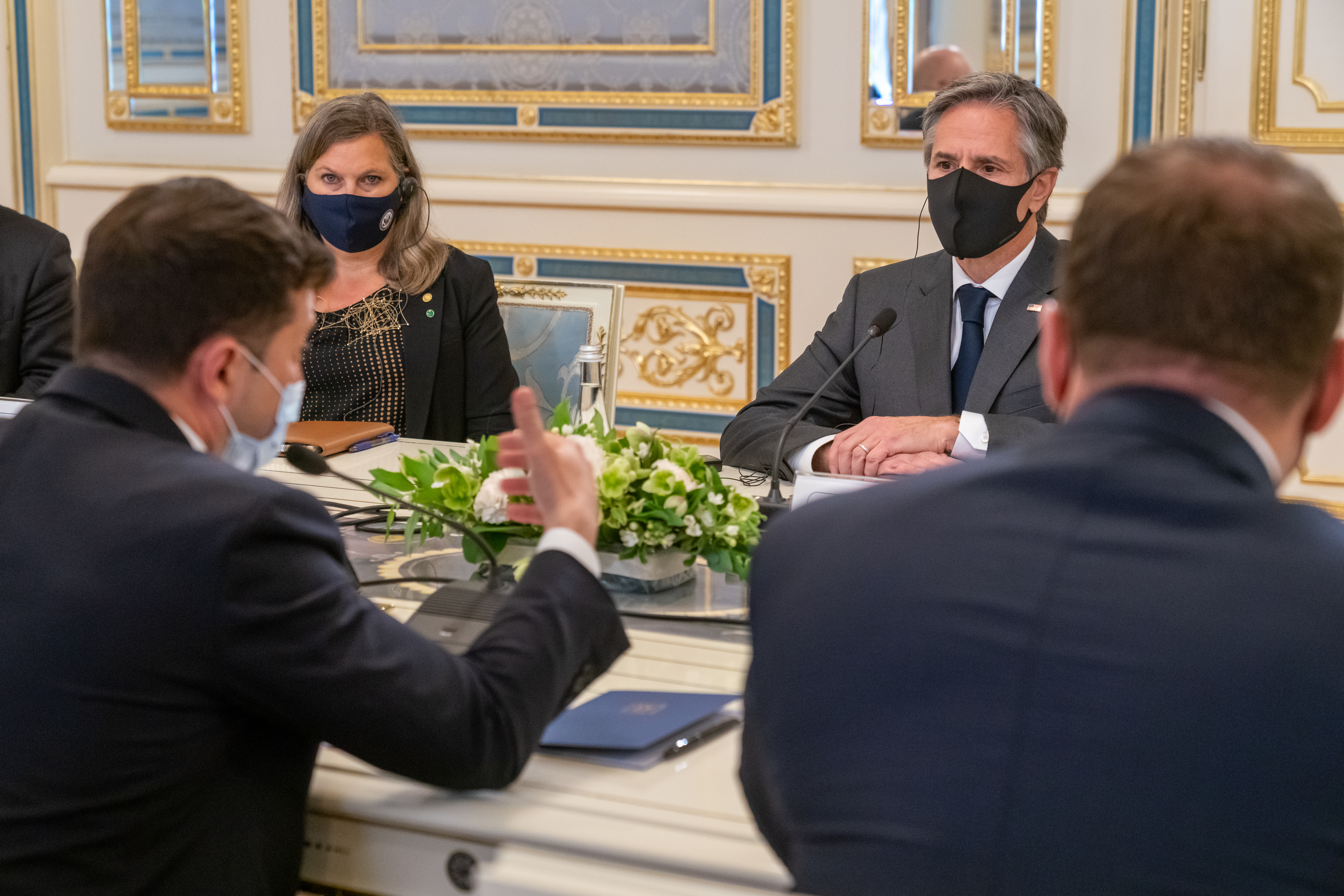
Nuland with Ukrainian president Volodymyr Zelenskyy and U.S. secretary of state Antony Blinken, May 6, 2021

On January 5, 2021, it was reported that President-elect Joe Biden would nominate Nuland to serve as under secretary of state for political affairs under Antony Blinken, who had been nominated to serve as secretary of state. Hearings on Nuland's nomination were held by the Senate Foreign Relations Committee on April 15, 2021. The committee favorably reported Nuland's nomination on April 21, 2021. On April 29, 2021, her nomination was confirmed unanimously by the Senate by voice vote, and she started her work as under secretary of state on May 3, 2021.

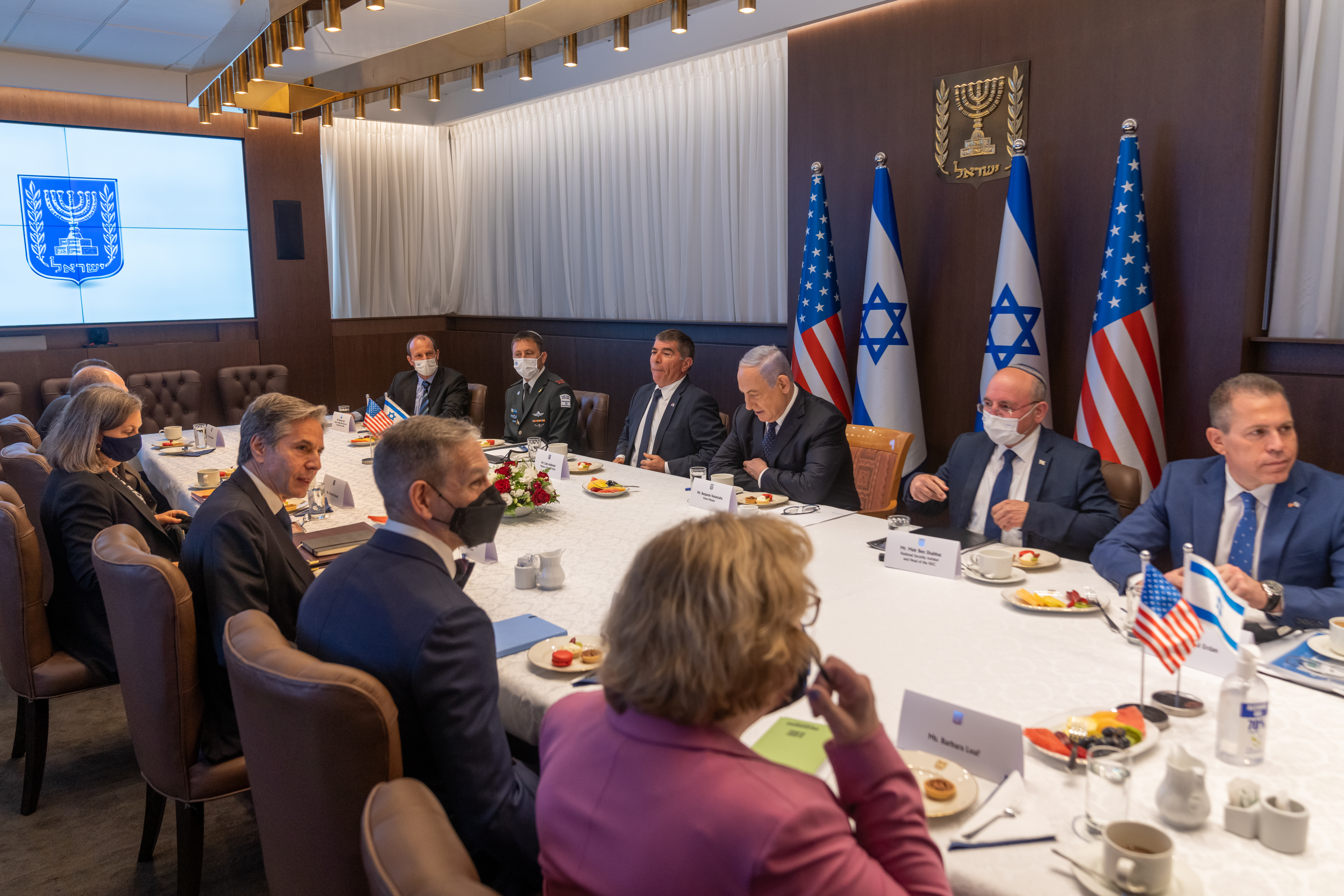
Nuland with Israeli prime minister Benjamin Netanyahu and Secretary of State Blinken in Jerusalem, Israel, May 25, 2021

In July 2021, Nuland met with Belarusian opposition leader Sviatlana Tsikhanouskaya in Washington. In March 2022, Nuland expressed concern that Russia would get control of Ukraine's biological research facilities during its invasion of Ukraine.

Nuland visited Delhi in March 2022 and suggested that there was an "evolution of thinking in India." She said that the US and Europe should be "defense and security partners" of India, and that Russia's invasion of Ukraine presents a "major inflection point in the autocratic-democratic struggle."

At a congressional hearing in early 2023, Nuland stated regarding the 2022 Nord Stream pipeline sabotage, "I am, and I think the administration is, very gratified to know that Nord Stream 2 is now... a hunk of metal at the bottom of the sea."

In a February 2024 interview with CNN's Christiane Amanpour, Nuland advocated for congressional approval of a $95.34 billion aid package, which is also designated for Ukraine, by delivering the following remarks: "We have to remember that the bulk of this money is going right back into the U.S., to make those weapons."

On March 5, 2024, it was announced Nuland will retire that month. She had hoped to succeed Wendy Sherman as deputy secretary of state, but President Biden nominated Kurt M. Campbell to that position.

== Personal life ==
Nuland's husband, Robert Kagan, is a historian, foreign policy commentator at the Brookings Institution. She has two children.

She is sometimes informally known as Toria Nuland.

Diplomatic posts
Preceded by Nicholas Burns	United States ambassador to NATO; 2005–2008	Succeeded by Kurt Volker
Political offices
Preceded by Philip Crowley	Spokesperson for the United States Department of State; 2011–2013	Succeeded by Jen Psaki
Preceded by Philip H. Gordon	Assistant Secretary of State for European and Eurasian Affairs; 2013–2017	Succeeded by John A. Heffern; Acting
Preceded by David Hale	Under Secretary of State for Political Affairs; 2021–2024	Succeeded by John R. Bass; Acting
Preceded by Wendy Sherman	Deputy Secretary of State; Acting; 2023–2024	Succeeded by Kurt M. Campbell
