= Michael Armacost =

American diplomat (1937–2025)

- Armacost in 1987

23rd United States Ambassador to Japan
- In office May 15, 1989 – July 19, 1993
- President: George H. W. Bush; Bill Clinton
- Preceded by: Mike Mansfield
- Succeeded by: Walter Mondale

Acting United States Secretary of State
- In office January 20, 1989 – January 25, 1989
- President: George H. W. Bush
- Preceded by: George Shultz
- Succeeded by: James Baker

13th Under Secretary of State for Political Affairs
- In office May 18, 1984 – March 2, 1989
- President: Ronald Reagan
- Preceded by: Lawrence Eagleburger
- Succeeded by: Robert M. Kimmitt

United States Ambassador to the Philippines
- In office March 12, 1982 – April 18, 1984
- President: Ronald Reagan
- Preceded by: Richard W. Murphy
- Succeeded by: Stephen W. Bosworth

President of the Brookings Institution
- In office October 2, 1995 – July 1, 2002
- Preceded by: Bruce K. MacLaury
- Succeeded by: Strobe Talbott

Personal details
- Born: Michael Hayden Armacost; April 15, 1937 Ohio, U.S.
- Died: March 8, 2025 (aged 87) near San Francisco, California, U.S.
- Education: Carleton College (BA); Columbia University (PhD)
- Occupation: Diplomat

Michael Hayden Armacost (April 15, 1937 – March 8, 2025) was an American diplomat, who was acting United States Secretary of State during the early days of the administration of President George H. W. Bush, before Secretary James Baker was confirmed by the Senate. Armacost also served as United States Ambassador to Japan and the president of the Brookings Institution from 1995 to 2002. He was later a fellow at Stanford University's Freeman Spogli Institute from 2002 to 2021.

== Life and career ==
Armacost was born in Ohio on April 15, 1937.

In the 1960s, Armacost taught international relations and foreign policy at Pomona College.

Armacost was a White House Fellow in 1969–1970. Founded in 1964, the White House Fellowship is one of America’s most prestigious programs for leadership and public service. The Fellowship, awarded on a strictly non-partisan basis, offers exceptional young leaders first-hand experience working at the highest levels of federal government.

In January 1977, Armacost was selected as a member of the National Security Council to handle East Asian and Chinese affairs under the Carter administration until July 1978, when he was replaced by Nicholas Platt. Years later, he was appointed to be the United States Ambassador to Japan from 1989 to 1993, Under Secretary of State for Political Affairs from 1984 to 1989, and United States Ambassador to the Philippines from 1982 to 1984, during a critical period of political upheaval during the Ferdinand Marcos presidency.

Armacost served as Acting Secretary of State from January 20, 1989, to January 25, 1989. Between 1995 and 2002, he served as president of the Brookings Institution.

Armacost had received the President's Distinguished Service Award, the Defense Department's Distinguished Civilian Service Award, and the Secretary of State's Distinguished Services Award.

Armacost was the author of three books, the most recent of which, Friends or Rivals?, was published in 1996 and draws on his tenure as ambassador. He also co-edited, with Daniel Okimoto, The Future of America's Alliances in Northeast Asia, published in 2004 by Stanford Walter H. Shorenstein Asia-Pacific Research Center. Armacost has served on numerous corporate and nonprofit boards, including TRW, AFLAC, Applied Materials, USEC, Inc., Cargill, Inc, Carleton College, and The Asia Foundation.

Armacost received a Bachelor of Arts in international relations (1958) and an honorary degree (1989) from Carleton College. He was an international fellow of the School of International and Public Affairs, Columbia University in 1961. He earned his Ph.D. from Columbia University in 1965.

Armacost was a Fellow of the National Academy of Public Administration. He was chairman of Carleton College's board of trustees from 2004 to 2008.

Armacost died at his home near San Francisco, on March 8, 2025, at the age of 87.

== Honors ==
  - ،Order of the Rising Sun, Grand Cordon, 2007 (Japan).

Diplomatic posts
Preceded by Richard W. Murphy	U.S. Ambassador to Philippines; 1982–1984	Succeeded by Stephen W. Bosworth
Preceded by Mike Mansfield	U.S. Ambassador to Japan; 1989–1993	Succeeded by Walter Mondale
Political offices
Preceded by Lawrence Eagleburger	Under Secretary of State for Political Affairs; 1984–1989	Succeeded by Robert M. Kimmitt
Preceded by George Shultz	United States Secretary of State; Acting; 1989	Succeeded by James Baker
Non-profit organization positions
Preceded by Bruce K. MacLaury	President of the Brookings Institution; 1995–2002	Succeeded by Strobe Talbott
