= Lawrence Eagleburger =

American statesman and diplomat (1930–2011)

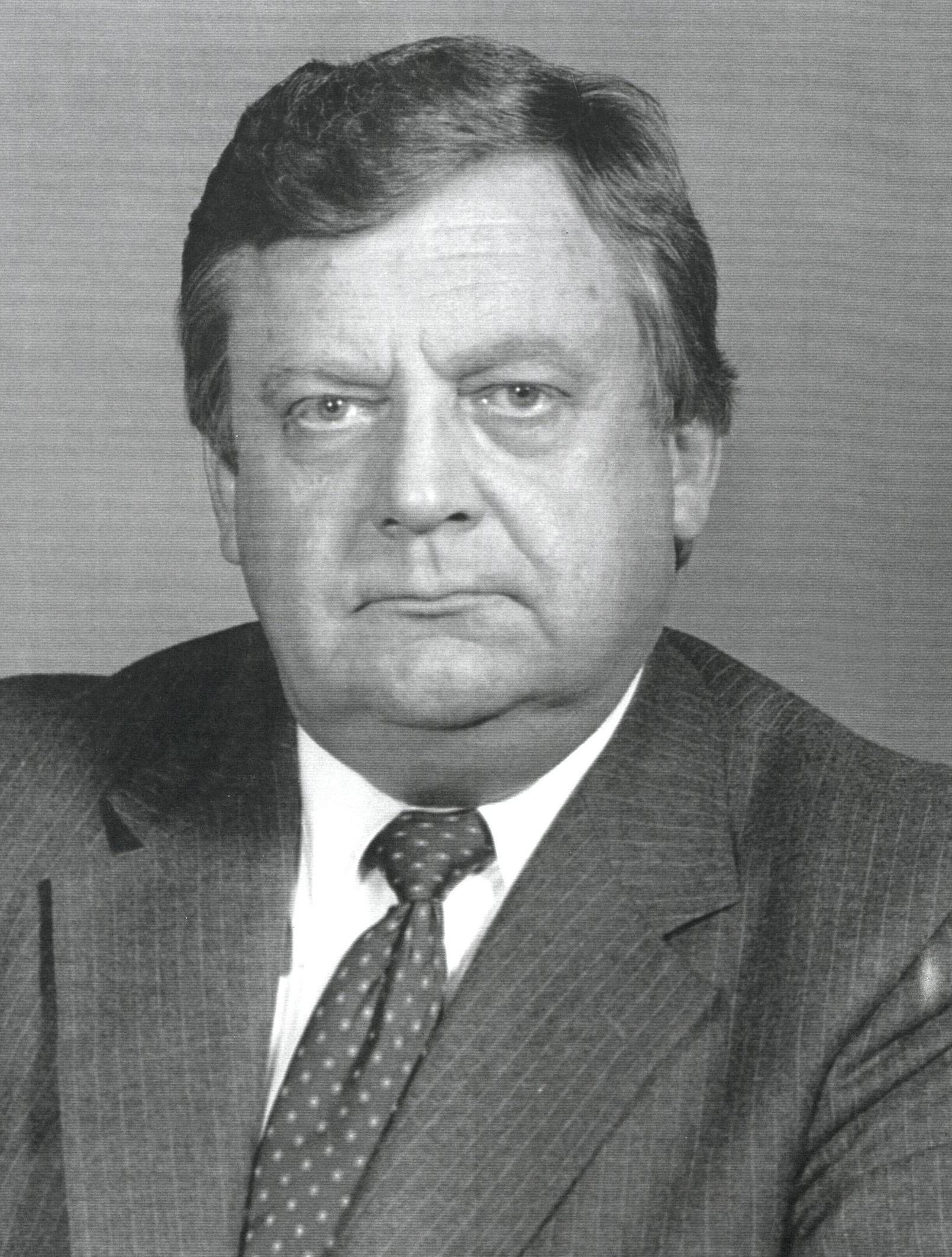
- Portrait, c. 1992

62nd United States Secretary of State
- In office August 23, 1992 – January 20, 1993; Acting: August 23, 1992 – December 8, 1992
- President: George H. W. Bush
- Preceded by: James Baker
- Succeeded by: Warren Christopher

10th United States Deputy Secretary of State
- In office March 20, 1989 – December 8, 1992
- President: George H. W. Bush
- Preceded by: John C. Whitehead
- Succeeded by: Clifton R. Wharton Jr.

12th Under Secretary of State for Political Affairs
- In office February 12, 1982 – May 1, 1984
- President: Ronald Reagan
- Preceded by: Walter Stoessel
- Succeeded by: Michael Armacost

12th Assistant Secretary of State for European Affairs
- In office May 14, 1981 – January 26, 1982
- President: Ronald Reagan
- Preceded by: George S. Vest
- Succeeded by: Richard Burt

United States Ambassador to Yugoslavia
- In office June 21, 1977 – January 24, 1981
- President: Jimmy Carter; Ronald Reagan
- Preceded by: Laurence Silberman
- Succeeded by: David Anderson

Personal details
- Born: Lawrence Sidney Eagleburger; August 1, 1930 Milwaukee, Wisconsin, U.S.
- Died: June 4, 2011 (aged 80) Charlottesville, Virginia, U.S.
- Resting place: Arlington National Cemetery
- Party: Republican
- Spouse: Marlene Heinemann (m. 1966; died 2010)
- Children: 3
- Education: University of Wisconsin–Stevens Point; University of Wisconsin–Madison (BA, MA)

Military service
- Allegiance: United States
- Branch/service: United States Army
- Years of service: 1952–1954
- Rank: First lieutenant

Lawrence Sidney Eagleburger (August 1, 1930 – June 4, 2011) was an American statesman and career diplomat who served briefly as the secretary of state under President George H. W. Bush from December 1992 to January 1993, one of the shortest terms in modern history. Previously, he had served in lesser capacities under Presidents Richard Nixon, Jimmy Carter, and Ronald Reagan, and as deputy secretary of state to James Baker under George H. W. Bush. Eagleburger is the only career Foreign Service officer to have served as secretary of state. He was also deputy assistant secretary of defense (for international security affairs) from January to May 1973. As a career member of the United States Senior Foreign Service, he attained the rank of career ambassador on April 12, 1984.

== Early life and education ==
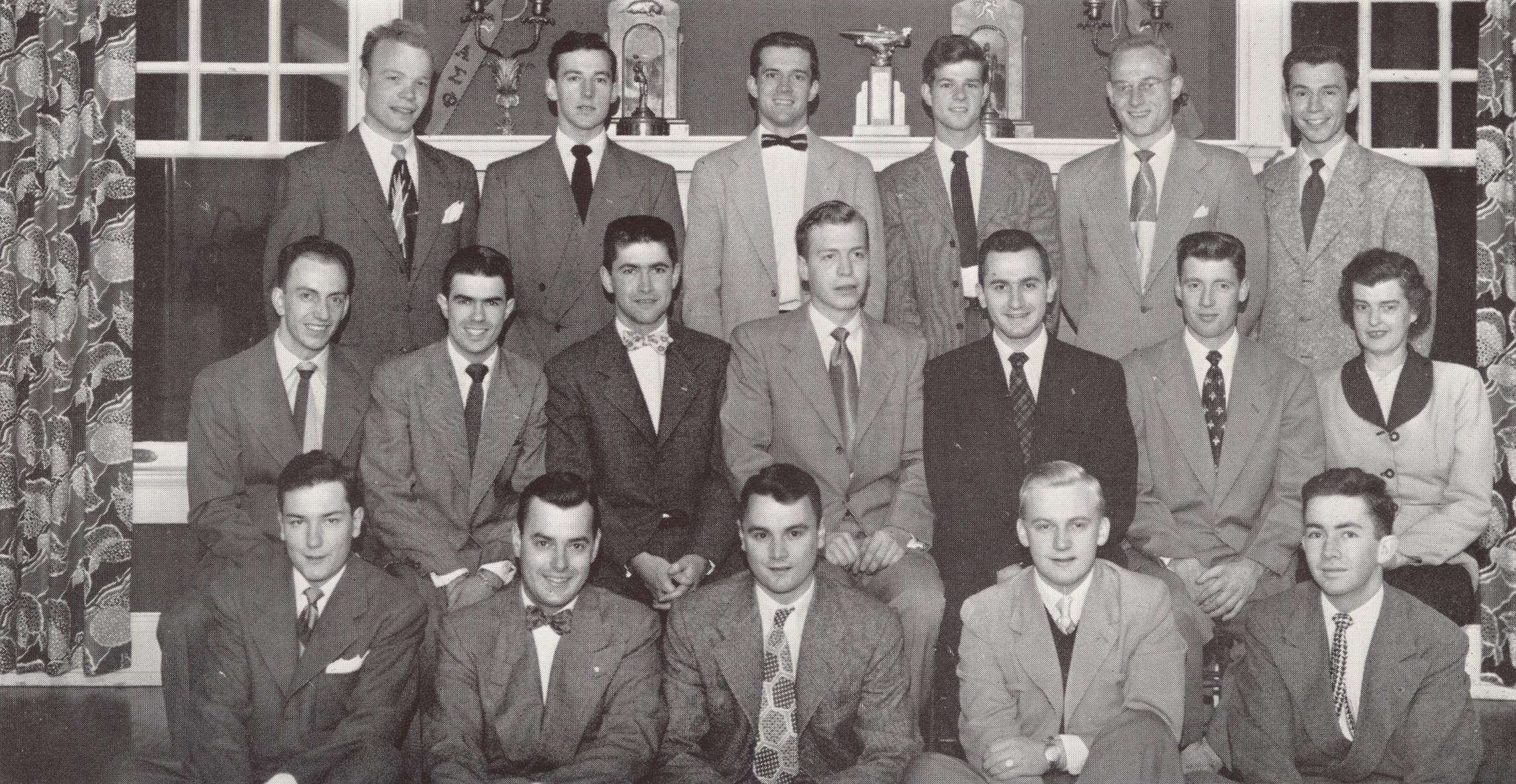
Eagleburger (bottom row, second from right) with other members of Alpha Sigma Phi at the University of Wisconsin–Madison, 1951

Eagleburger was born in Milwaukee, Wisconsin, the son of Helen Eagleburger (née Van Ornum), an elementary school teacher, and Leon Sidney Eagleburger, a medical doctor. He graduated from Jacobs High School in Stevens Point, Wisconsin, then attended Stevens Point State College (now the University of Wisconsin–Stevens Point), before earning his bachelor's and master's degrees from the University of Wisconsin. During his time at Wisconsin, he joined Alpha Sigma Phi fraternity.

He was also a member of the Board of Visitors at the College of William & Mary from 1996 to 2000 and from 2002 to 2006.

Eagleburger also served in the United States Army (1952–1954), attaining the rank of first lieutenant.

== Governmental career ==
In 1957, Eagleburger joined the United States Foreign Service, and served in various posts in embassies, consulates, and the Department of State. From 1961 to 1965 he served as a staffer at the U.S. Embassy in Belgrade, Yugoslavia. He was known as the person who handled the Skopje 1963 earthquake crisis, and managed the first US–Soviet humanitarian cooperation, after which he was nicknamed Lawrence of Macedonia.

Starting in 1969, he served in the Nixon administration as an assistant to National Security Advisor Henry Kissinger. He stayed in this appointment until 1971; thereafter he took on several positions, including advisor to the U.S. Mission to NATO in Brussels, and, following Kissinger's appointment as secretary of state, a number of additional posts in the State Department and deputy assistant secretary of defense (1971–73).

According to Bob Woodward in his 2026 memoir Secrets, Eagleburger was a confidential source who helped inform Woodward about Nixon's actions the night before he resigned from the Presidency.

Following Nixon's resignation, he briefly left government service. He was then named the executive secretary to the secretary of state from 1975 to 1977, and subsequently was appointed as ambassador to Yugoslavia by President Jimmy Carter, a post he held from 1977 to 1980. While working as Executive Secretary to Kissinger in 1975 he carried out secret talks with the Cubans in New York City.

From May 14, 1981, to January 26, 1982, Eagleburger was assistant secretary of state for European affairs. In 1982, Reagan appointed him as undersecretary of state for political affairs (the State Department's third-ranking position), a position he held for several years. He attained the rank of career ambassador in the Senior Foreign Service on April 12, 1984. He then became president of Kissinger Associates, a consultancy firm which provided firms with advice on international politics; in this capacity he was appointed in 1985 by George P. Shultz to a panel evaluating the Reagan administration's policy toward apartheid South Africa, where he was one of three dissenting voices that called increased pressure on the apartheid government "wasteful and counterproductive." In 1989, President George H. W. Bush appointed him deputy secretary of state (the department's second-ranking position); he also served as the president's primary advisor for affairs relating to the quickly disintegrating Yugoslavia. On August 23, 1992, James Baker resigned as secretary of state (to manage Bush's unsuccessful re-election campaign), and Eagleburger served as acting secretary of state until Bush gave him a recess appointment for the remainder of the Bush administration.

His period as advisor for Yugoslavian affairs from 1989 to 1992 was controversial as he gained a reputation for being a strong Serbian partisan. This perceived partisanship led the European press to dub him Lawrence of Serbia (a reference to Lawrence of Arabia). Eagleburger had controversial ties to Yugoslavia both in promoting loans to Yugoslavia as a government official and later serving on the board of the Yugoslav-government-owned LBS Bank (Ljubljanska Banka) as well as with Yugo Motors, USA. About one-quarter of LBS Bank's business came from Banca Nazionale del Lavoro, whose Atlanta branch was instrumental in diverting U.S. agricultural loans to arms purchases by Saddam Hussein.

In 1991, President Bush awarded him the Presidential Citizens Medal. He was a member of the board of directors of the International Republican Institute.

== International Commission on Holocaust-Era Insurance Claims ==
Eagleburger became chairman of the International Commission on Holocaust Era Insurance Claims, or ICHEIC, which was set up in 1998. The purpose of the commission was to resolve unpaid Nazi-era insurance claims for survivors of the Holocaust. In 2005, Eagleburger announced that the ICHEIC was offering approximately 16 million dollars to Holocaust victims and their heirs, noting as he did so the research ability of the ICHEIC staff which allowed them to evaluate claims from companies which no longer existed. In the years prior to this there had been some controversy about the commission, including reports that it was over-budgeted and too slow, and that insurance companies which had previously agreed to work with the ICHEIC had failed to disclose policyholder lists. Eagleburger responded to these accusations by saying, among other things, that it was difficult to work quickly when many of the claimants lacked basic information such as the name of the insurance company involved.

== Stance on Middle Eastern conflict ==
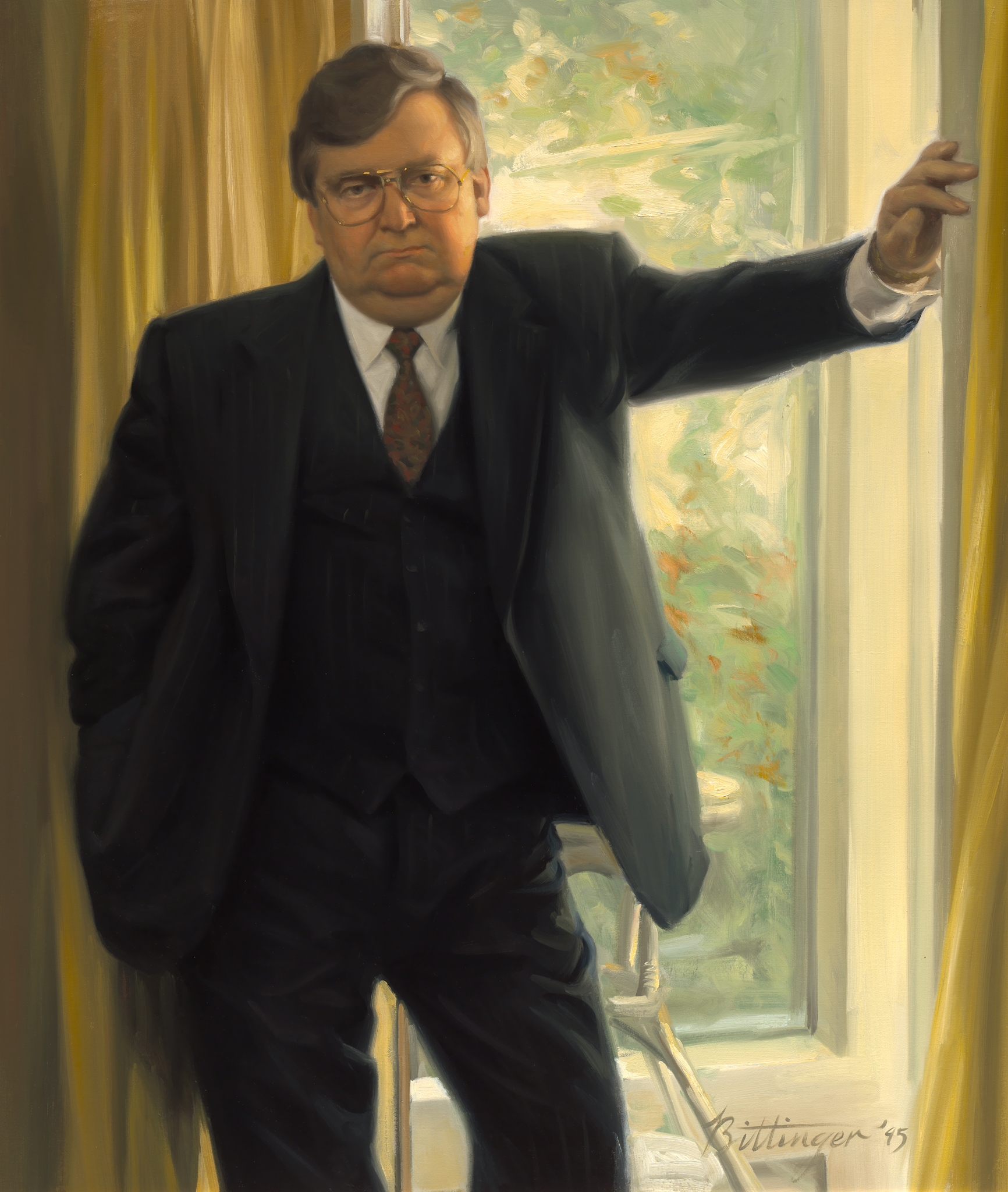
Painted portrait of Eagleburger

After serving in the Foreign Service for twenty-seven years, Eagleburger retained an interest in foreign policy and was a familiar figure on current events talk shows. His public comments about President George W. Bush's foreign policy sometimes generated controversy. In August 2002, Eagleburger questioned the timing of possible military action in Iraq, saying, "I am not at all convinced now that this is something we have to do this very moment." He did indicate he believed that Iraqi regime change could be a legitimate U.S. endeavor at some point, but that at that time he did not believe the administration was fully prepared for such a conflict. In April 2003, following warnings by the Bush administration to the government of Syria, Eagleburger condemned the possibility of military action in Syria or Iran, saying that public opinion would not support such a move and that "If President Bush were to try it now, even I would feel he should be skinned alive."

On January 5, 2006, he participated in a meeting at the White House of former secretaries of defense and state to discuss United States foreign policy with Bush administration officials. On November 10, 2006 it was announced that he would replace secretary of defense–designate Robert Gates in the Iraq Study Group.

After the election of Iranian president Mahmoud Ahmadinejad, Eagleburger seemed to think that Iran was moving in a direction which may at some point call for military action, saying in an interview that while "we should try everything else we can first", at some point it would probably be necessary to use force to ensure that Iran did not obtain or use nuclear weapons.

He was chairman of the board of trustees for The Forum for International Policy, and a member of the Washington Institute for Near East Policy (WINEP) Board of Advisors.

== 2008 presidential election ==
Before the Republican primaries, Eagleburger endorsed John McCain for president. In an NPR interview on October 30, 2008, he described McCain's running-mate Sarah Palin as "not prepared" for top office. He also stated that many vice presidents have not been ready. The next day, in an interview on Fox News, he retracted his comments about Palin.

On October 30, 2008, on the Fox News Channel, Eagleburger referred to Democratic presidential nominee Barack Obama as a "charlatan," citing his fundraising methods and other aspects of his presidential campaign.

== Death ==
Eagleburger died of pneumonia at the University of Virginia Medical Center in Charlottesville, Virginia, on June 4, 2011. He was eighty years old and had lived outside Charlottesville since 1990. He was survived by his three sons.

President Barack Obama described Eagleburger as a "distinguished diplomat and public servant who devoted his life to the security of our nation and to strengthening our ties with allies and partners." Former President George H. W. Bush described Eagleburger as "a tireless patriot, principled to the core, selflessly devoted to America and his duty." Vice President Joe Biden remarked "The post-Cold War world [...] is more stable and secure because of Eagleburger's service." "Larry believed in the strength of America's values, and he fought for them around the world," said Secretary of State Hillary Clinton.

Lawrence and his wife Marlene Ann are both interred at Arlington National Cemetery.

== Personal life ==
Eagleburger had three sons, all of whom are named Lawrence Eagleburger, albeit with different middle names (Scott, Andrew and Jason). When asked why he named his three children after himself, Eagleburger stated, "It was ego. And secondly, I wanted to screw up the Social Security system."

His eldest son is from his first marriage, which ended in divorce. The younger two are from his second marriage, which was to Marlene Ann Heinemann and lasted from 1966 until her death in 2010.

== See also ==
- List of United States secretaries of state

Political offices
Preceded by George S. Vest	Assistant Secretary of State for European Affairs; May 14, 1981–January 26, 1982	Succeeded by Richard Burt
Preceded by Walter John Stoessel Jr.	Under Secretary of State for Political Affairs; 1982–1984	Succeeded by Michael Armacost
Preceded by John C. Whitehead	United States Deputy Secretary of State; 1989–1992	Succeeded by Clifton R. Wharton Jr.
Preceded by James Baker	U.S. Secretary of State; Served under: George H. W. Bush; December 8, 1992 – January 20, 1993; Acting: August 23 to December 8, 1992	Succeeded by Warren Christopher
