= David Hugh McCulloch =

Early American Aviator

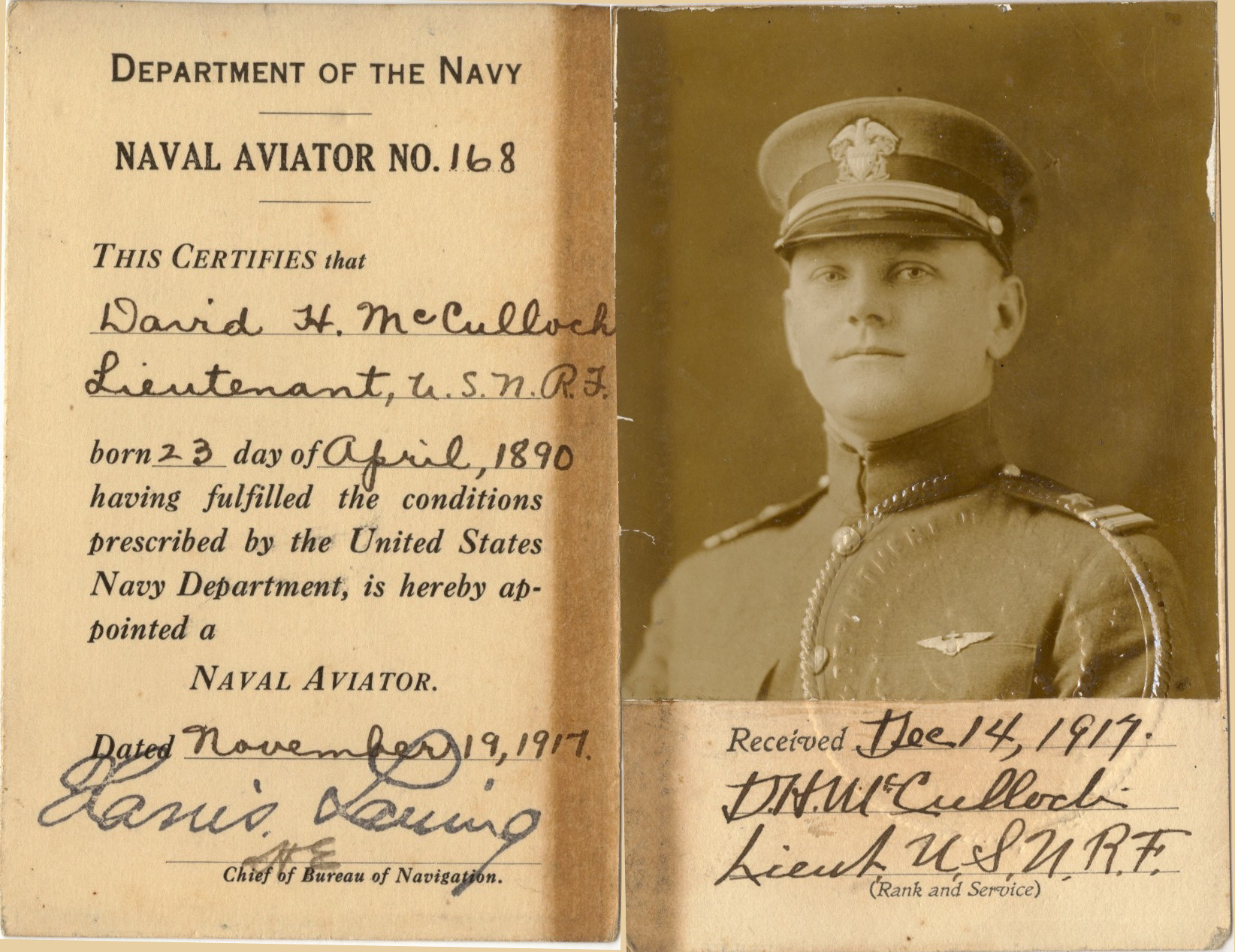
- McCulloch: Naval Aviator No. 168
- Born: April 23, 1890; Port Royal, Pennsylvania
- Died: September 20, 1955 (aged 65); New York, NY
- Resting place: Woodlawn Cemetery, West Palm Beach, FL
- Spouse: Helen Wheeler Fair
- Awards: Navy Cross; Order of the Tower and Sword
- Aviation career
- First flight: 1912; Curtiss Aircraft
- Famous flights: Co-pilot NC-3, First Transatlantic Crossing 1919
- Air force: US Navy
- Rank: Lieutenant Commander, USN

David Hugh McCulloch (April 23, 1890 – September 20, 1955) was an early American aviator who worked with Glenn Curtiss from 1912. Curtiss was a contemporary and competitor to the Wright brothers, Wilbur and Orville, who had made the first flights at Kitty Hawk in 1903. Curtiss won the world's first air race at Reims in France in August 1909, and was now becoming the driving force in American aviation. McCulloch's early work with Curtiss consisted of demonstrating, training and selling Curtiss planes and participating in early developments of flight. He trained the First Yale Unit (using Curtiss flying boats), and in two consecutive days in 1917, he and several of his pupils from the First Yale Unit made flights that convinced the Navy to bring aircraft aboard ships. Later, McCulloch was co-pilot with Holden C. Richardson and flight commander John Henry Towers of the NC-3, the leader of the three Navy flying boats making the first flight across the Atlantic Ocean.

== Birth and early career ==
McCulloch was born in 1890 in Port Royal, Pennsylvania, to William Turbett McCulloch and Lucretia Jane McManigal, both of whose families were early residents of Pennsylvania. The McCullochs were mill owners and horse breeders. They also bred springer spaniels and pointers for hunting. From an early age David and his brothers fished for trout, walleye, northern pike, and other fish in the lakes and rivers and hunted deer, turkeys, geese, ducks, pheasants, quail, and bears.

== Marriage and family ==
McCulloch married Helen Wheeler Fair, daughter of Robert Maitland Fair and Emma Dean, on April 20, 1920. They had three daughters: Virginia Fair, Elizabeth Maitland, and Helen Lucretia. Their only son, David, died as a baby. Helen's father, Robert Maitland Fair, had been managing partner of Marshall Field's, then the biggest retail business in the world. He funded his niece Neltje Blanchan De Graff (pen name Neltje Blanchan) and her husband Frank Nelson Doubleday to set up their publishing business, which became the biggest publisher in the United States. McCulloch's wife Helen had started coming to Palm Beach in the early 1900s, making deep-sea fishing trips with Lawrence Waterbury II and Payne Whitney. McCulloch and his wife built a house in Palm Beach where he was a founding member of the Bath and Tennis Club.

== Early interest in aviation ==
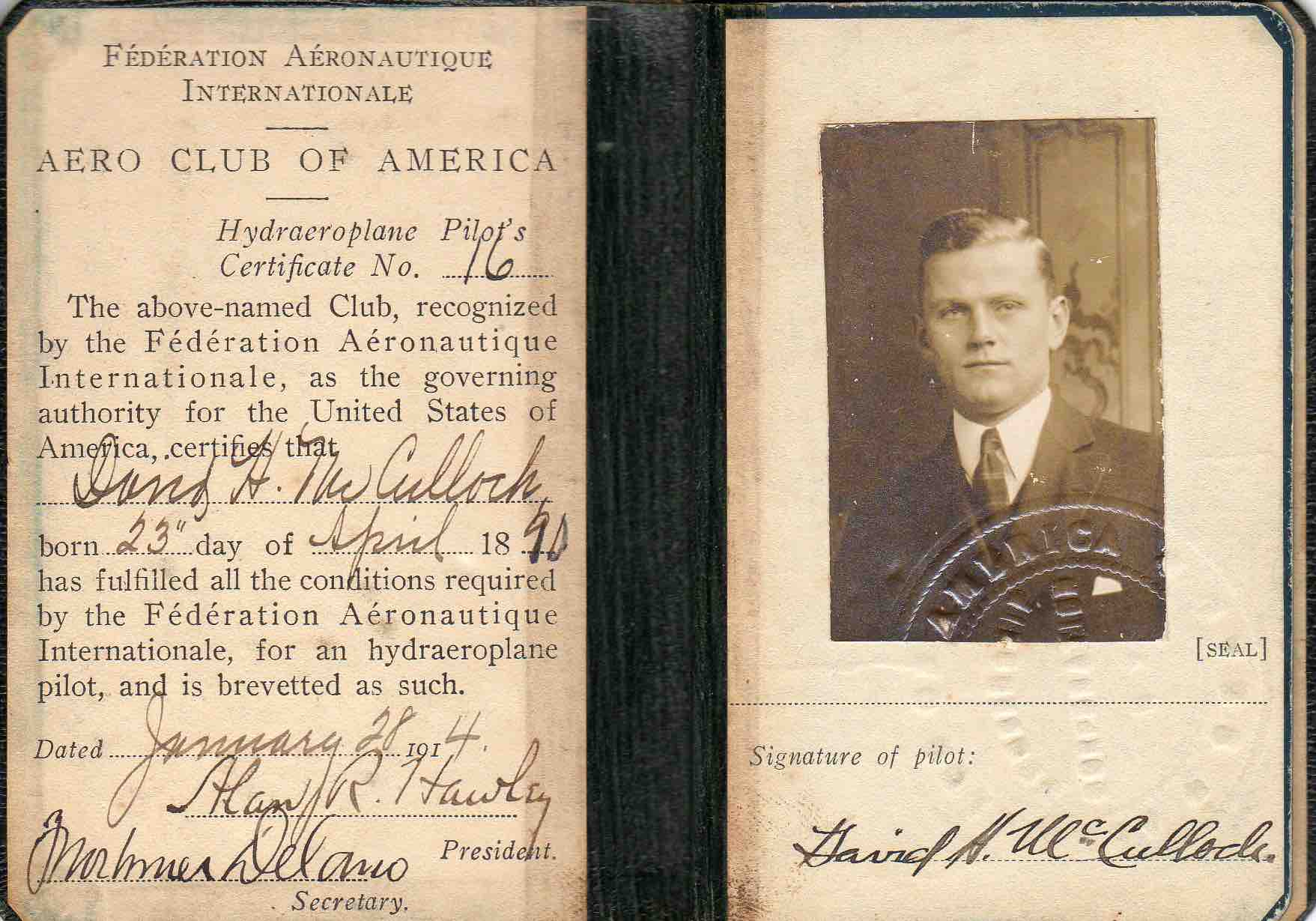
David Hugh McCulloch Hydroaeroplane Certificate No. 16 of the Aero Club of America

In 1912 at the age of 22, McCulloch learned to fly at the Curtiss Flying School in Hammondsport, New York. He then purchased his own plane for sport and business. A sportsman and bon vivant, McCulloch made friends with and enthused people who later became leaders in the industry. Among these friends were Harry Frank Guggenheim, Edward Francis Hutton, Nelson Slater, Vincent Astor (from whom he bought Shore Cottage in Sands Point), and Rodman Wanamaker. In 1915 he worked with the Aero Club of America (of which he was a member and received Hydroaeroplane Pilots's Certificate No. 16) and the Aero Club of Pennsylvania to aid in establishing planes for the defense of the area by purchasing and donating two aerohydroplanes (valued at $15,000 in 1915 dollars) to help form Pennsylvania's aerial fleet of five planes.

== Work with Glenn Curtiss ==
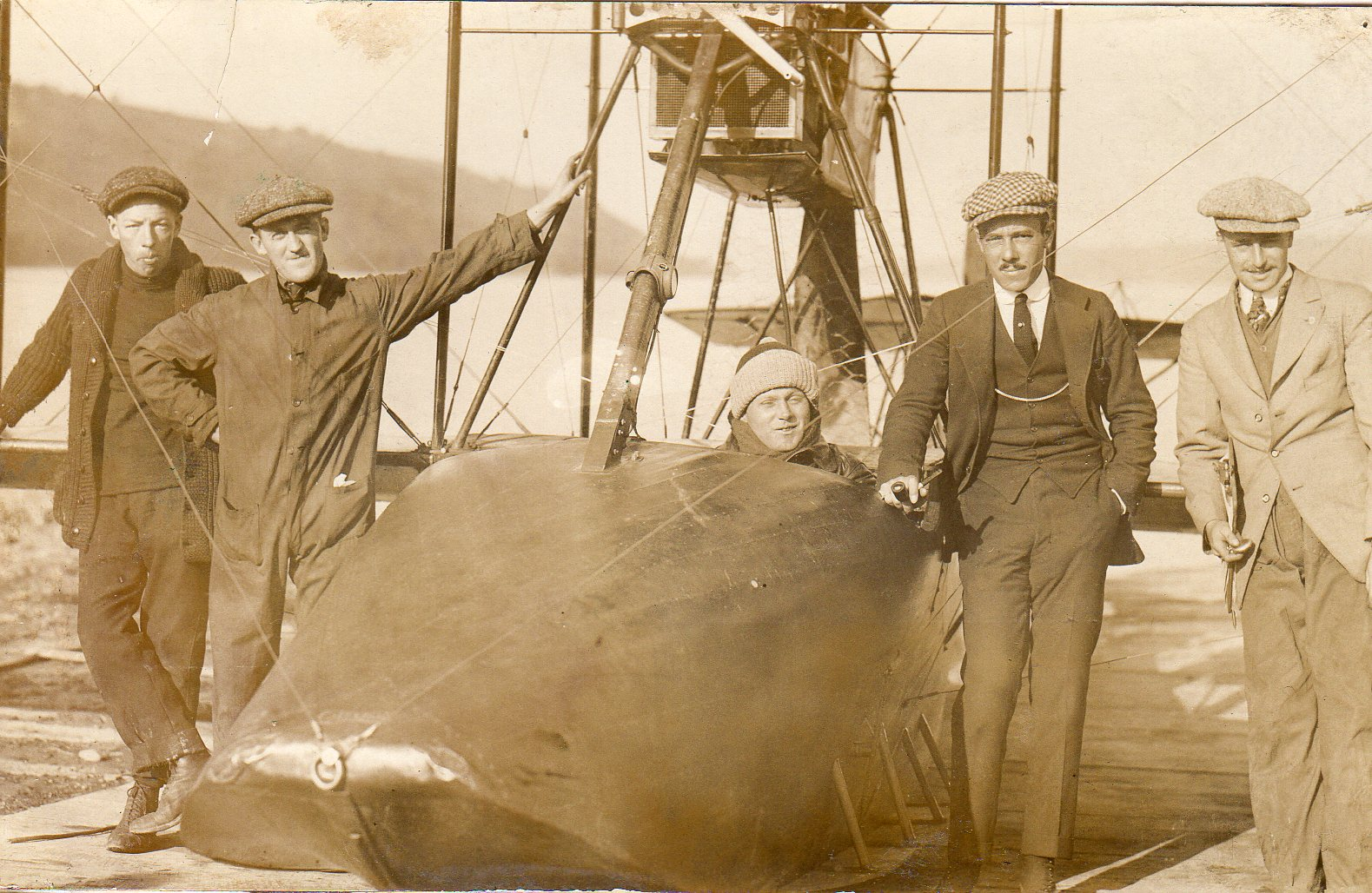
Photo of David Hugh McCulloch in Curtiss Model F Flying Boat – F. C. G. Eden on far right

After McCulloch received instruction at the Curtiss Flying School at Hammondsport, New York. He became a close friend and employee of Curtiss. While with Curtiss from 1912 to 1914 he demonstrated, taught, and sold Curtiss flying boats to the governments of South American countries. He worked with the Brazilian Government and flew Brazilian president Hermes da Fonseca over Guanabara Bay (1st flight of a Brazilian president over the skies of Brazil). Starting in 1914 he managed the Curtiss Flying School. In 1915 he was sent to be the instructor at the Italian Naval Aeronautics School in Taranto. McCulloch continued his affiliation with Curtiss using Curtiss Model F flying boats for instruction and eventually co-piloting one of the Curtiss NC flying boats for the Navy on the first transatlantic crossing voyage.

== American Trans-Oceanic Company ==
In 1916 McCulloch became the manager and chief pilot of the newly formed Rodman Wanamaker American Trans-Oceanic Company based in Port Washington, New York. It was formed with a vision of becoming the first commercial airline to offer non-stop trans-Atlantic flights. It became one of the earliest commercial airlines in the US. While at American Trans-Oceanic Company, McCulloch became the instructor for the First Yale Unit.

== Training the First Yale Unit ==
World War I was underway. With the examples of the Lafayette Escadrille and the heroic exploits of Tommy Hitchcock Jr. in the Lafayette Flying Corps in France, a group of Yale students decided to set up their own unit to join the War. F. Trubee Davison who had been to Paris in 1915 came home and decided to start the group which became known as the First Yale Unit. They sought an instructor. Davison's mother Kate Trubee Davison and her husband Henry Pomeroy Davison (senior partner at J.P. Morgan & Co. and a player in the formation of the Federal Reserve) gave them a plane. They discovered McCulloch who was then manager and pilot at Wanamaker's Trans Oceanic Company. He agreed to instruct the Yale students and put them through a thorough, methodical course at Port Washington and Huntington in the summer and fall, and West Palm Beach in the winter. These young men of the First Yale Unit ended up playing a major role in the beginning of American airpower. Members (such as Robert Lovett) of this First Yale Unit became important not only in World War I but right through World War II and on to help guide American military policy into the 1950s.

== Role in expanding the usefulness of naval aviation ==
By 1915, the US Navy had begun experimenting with aircraft landing on ships but the value of seaplanes for coastal defense was not fully realized. During the week of September 5, 1915, the annual training maneuver of the Naval Reserve and the regular Navy were taking place at Gravesend Bay in Brooklyn. McCulloch and some of his students of the Yale Unit now known as the "Volunteer Aerial Coastal Patrol Unit No. 1" took part. Their role was to operate with the fleet to help work out problems of coastal defense. The Navy had secretly laid a field of mines and the first task of the group was to attempt to discover them by air. McCulloch piloted the plane and Harry Davison was the observer. They quickly discovered and charted the mines. Even more spectacular, their next task was to discover two destroyers masquerading as hostile cruisers that were attempting to sneak past defenses. McCulloch piloted a plane with F. Trubee Davison as observer. They succeeded in finding the two ships even though visibility was low. They received praise from the Navy and to quote Alan R. Hawley, president of the Aero Club of America, from a letter to F. Trubee Davison, "The fact that we have not an adequate Air Service accentuates the value of the efforts being made by the patriotic members of your Unit. Your good example is being followed by hundreds of others who realize that aeronautics is the most important branch of our defenses and that naval aeronautics has been shamefully neglected."

== Curtiss NC-3 and the First Transatlantic flight team ==
Curtiss built four Curtiss NC flying boats (Curtiss NC-1 through Curtiss NC-4) for the US Navy that were to be used for hunting submarines. But World War I ended and as the NC flying boats were no longer needed for war, the Navy decided to attempt a first transatlantic crossing by air and to use three of these flying boats. McCulloch was brought into active duty in March 1919 to partake in the flight. He was chosen as co-pilot of the NC-3, the flagship plane, along with Holden C. Richardson as pilot and John Henry Towers as navigator and commander of the fleet. The triumphant flight across the Atlantic began on May 8, 1919. On the leg of the trip from Trepassey Bay to the Azores, upon the landing in heavy seas near the Azores on May 17, one of the wing pontoons broke. While at sea for two days McCulloch and the rest of the crew of the NC-3 alternated tying themselves to the wing opposite the one with the broken pontoon so as to keep the flying boat level. In order to survive they drank radiator water. During the two days at sea, back home in the US, the crew of the NC-3 was all but given up for as it was assumed that the flying boat had sunk. After traveling for two days at sea, once spotted at Ponta Delgado, they refused to be towed in and came into port under their own power. The NC-4 continued on to complete this voyage with their arrival in Lisbon. McCulloch and his crew went by destroyer to Plymouth, England, to join the festivities in Europe for this first successful transatlantic crossing by air. McCulloch was awarded the Navy Cross for this service.

== Seaplane altitude record-setting flight ==
On August 19, 1921, McCulloch took the Loening Model 23 to a seaplane record setting flight of 19,500 feet. The flight took place in Port Washington, NY. There were three passenger, Leroy Grumman, Ladislaus D'Orcy, and Grover Loening. This flight was said to also better the American record for land planes flying with passengers.

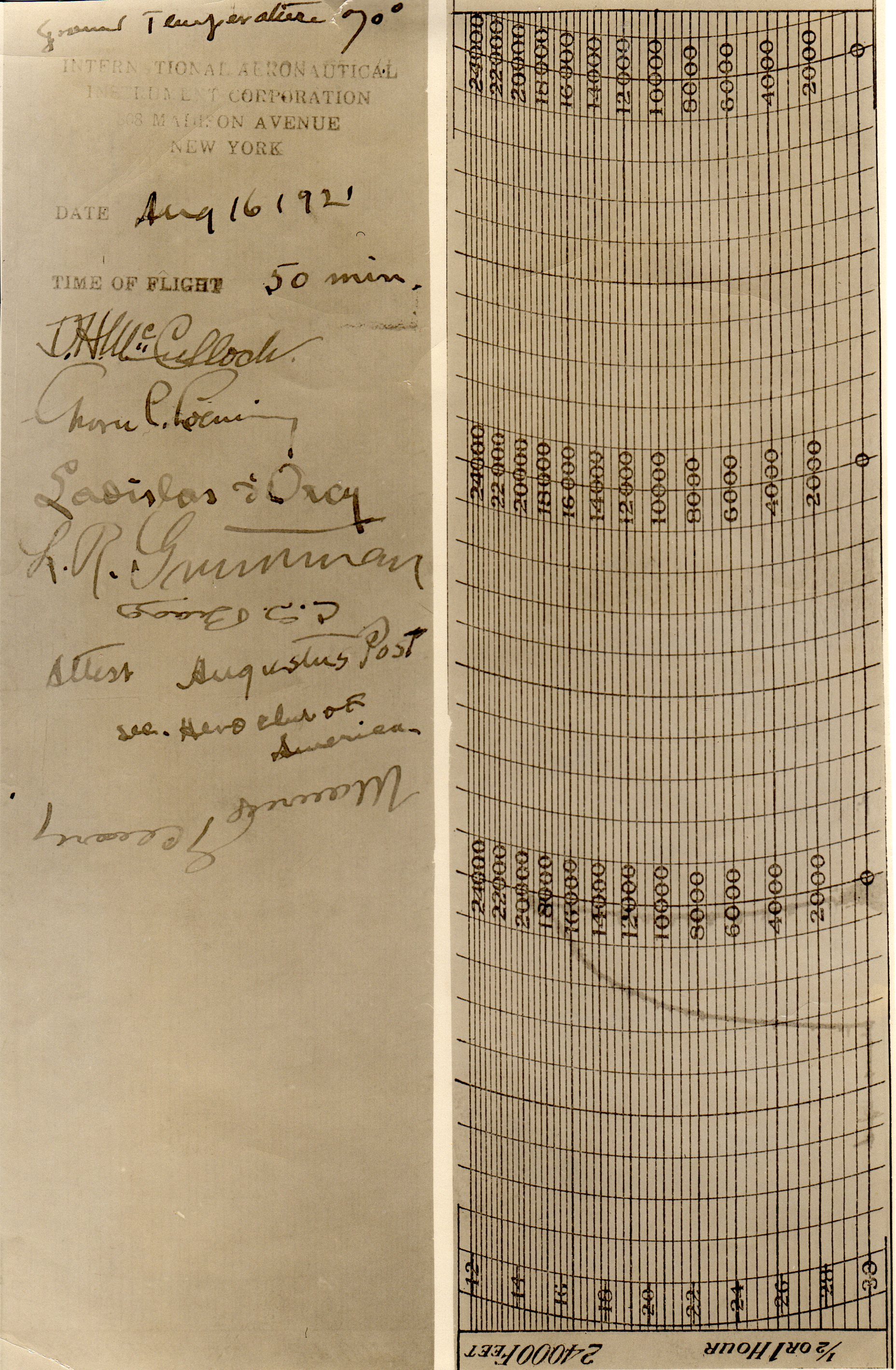
Loening Model 23 Seaplane Altitude Record Flight Chart August 16, 1921

== World War II re-enlistment ==
McCulloch reentered the United States Navy on June 29, 1942, as a Lieutenant Commander to assist the Naval Air Force with administrative duties during World War II. His first duties were with the training department at Floyd Bennett Field in New York, and he was later transferred to the staff of Vice Admiral Patrick N. L. Bellinger and stationed in Norfolk, Virginia. Toward the end of this period of service, he spent time in the hospital in convalescence due to chronic arthritis. He left the Navy at the age of 56 in June, 1946. Following this, his ill health led to quiet retirement in New York City.

== Death ==
McCulloch died of throat cancer on September 20, 1955, in New York, NY and was buried in Woodlawn Cemetery in West Palm Beach, Palm Beach County, Florida.

== Awards, honors, and achievements ==
- Curtiss Marine Flying Trophy (1915) for longest flight made within 10 hours in a flying boat; he flew 480 miles (772 km) in 7 hours 42 minutes
- Order of the Tower and Sword by government of Portugal; awarded to the crews of the First Transatlantic Flight.
- Navy Cross; Awarded to the crews of the First Transatlantic Flight.
- Decorated by Italy for work in training the newly formed Italian Naval Air Force.
- Altitude record for seaplanes August 16, 1921.

== Timeline ==
- 1890: Birth in Port Royal, Pennsylvania
- 1912: Student at Curtiss Flying School
- 1912–1914: Demonstrated, taught, and sold Curtiss aircraft in South America
- 1913 April 15: Flew Brazilian president Hermes da Fonseca over Guanabara Bay (1st flight of a Brazilian president)
- 1914: Managed Curtiss Flying School at Hammondsport, New York
- 1914: Membership in Aero Club of America (Hydroaeroplane pilot's certificate no. 16)
- 1915: Instructor, Italian Naval Aeronautics School at Taranto
- 1916: Manager and chief pilot of Rodman Wanamaker American Trans-Oceanic Company Port Washington, New York
- 1916 – May 1917: Flight instructor for First Yale Unit at Port Washington, New York, and West Palm Beach, Florida
- 1917 Oct 30: Enrolled as lieutenant (Naval Aviator #168) in Naval Reserve Flying Corps (NRFC) Heavier Than Air (HTA) group at Hampton Roads, Office of the Chief of Naval Operations
- 1919 March 5: Called to active duty in Naval Aviation as lieutenant to participate in Naval First Transatlantic Crossing
- 1919 May: Copilot of NC-3 as part of Squadron in first Transatlantic crossing
- 1919 June: Promoted to naval lieutenant commander
- 1919 Fall: Inactive duty Navy
- 1919–1933: Pilot manager of American Trans-Oceanic Company and president and owner Curtiss Metropolitan Airplane Co.
- 1921 August 16: Set altitude record (19,500 feet) for seaplanes, carrying three passengers in a Loening Model 23
- 1921 September 30: Received honorable discharge from Navy
- 1924 March 24: Elected to the National Aeronautic Association
- 1928: Membership in Naval Order of the United States
- 1933–1942: President and owner Engineers Motors Corporation
- 1942 June 29: Entered WWII as lieutenant commander stationed initially at Floyd Bennett Field with Atlantic Fleet
- 1946 Feb 1: Retired from Navy
- 1955 Sept 20: Died of throat cancer
- 1973: Posthumously awarded Glenn Curtiss medal commemorating flight of the NC flying boats
