= Patsy Pulitzer =

American model, socialite and philanthropist (1928–2011)

- Pulitzer by Frances McLaughlin-Gill, Vogue, 1957
- Born: Gladys Pulitzer; May 31, 1928; New York City, U.S.
- Died: October 28, 2011 (aged 83); New York City, U.S.
- Resting place: Locust Valley Cemetery, Locust Valley, New York, U.S.
- Education: Palm Beach Day School; Foxcroft School; Finch College
- Occupation: Model
- Spouses: David Frost Bartlett (m. 1949, divorced); Lewis Thompson Preston (m. 1959; died 1995)
- Children: 4
- Relatives: Joseph Pulitzer (grandfather); Lilly Pulitzer (sister-in-law); Roxanne Pulitzer (sister-in-law); Charles L. Bartlett (brother-in-law)

Gladys "Patsy" Pulitzer Preston (May 31, 1928 – October 28, 2011) was an American fashion model, socialite and philanthropist. The granddaughter of newspaper publisher Joseph Pulitzer, founder of the Pulitzer Prize, she grew up in Palm Beach, Florida. In 1961, she appeared in Sports Illustrated as one of the "World's Loveliest Sportswomen", after catching a 1,230-pound (560 kg) black marlin, a then world-record catch for a woman. She modeled and appeared in various magazines. In later life, she was active in women's rights causes, particularly Planned Parenthood.

== Early life ==
Gladys Pulitzer was born in New York City on May 31, 1928, the daughter of Gladys Mildred Munn and Herbert "Tony" Pulitzer, and a granddaughter of Joseph Pulitzer, newspaper publisher and founder of the Pulitzer Prize. She grew up in Palm Beach, Florida. Pulitzer was educated at Palm Beach Day School and the Foxcroft School, Middleburg, Virginia, and earned an associate of arts degree from Finch College, New York. Her brother Herbert Pulitzer was married to the fashion designer Lilly Pulitzer, and Roxanne Pulitzer.

== Career ==
In 1961, she appeared in Sports Illustrated as one of the "World's Loveliest Sportswomen", after catching 1,230-pound (560 kg) black marlin fish off Cabo Blanco, Peru, a then world-record fish for a woman (Sports Illustrated began publication in 1954.).

She was a model for the Ford Modeling Agency. In 1953 and 1955, she was photographed by Slim Aarons. In 1961, she was photographed by Frances McLaughlin-Gill for Sports Illustrated in Palm Beach, Florida, wearing clothes from Lilly Pulitzer Fashions, her sister-in-law's brand.

In later life, she was active in women's rights causes, particularly Planned Parenthood.

== Personal life ==
On June 27, 1949, she married investment broker David Frost Bartlett (1924–1997), brother of Charles L. Bartlett, at the family's estate in Oyster Bay, New York. They later divorced. In 1964, he married Stefane Abeille Demay.

In 1959, she married Lewis Thompson Preston (1926–1995), chairman of J.P. Morgan & Co. and president of the World Bank. They lived in Washington, D.C., and Palm Beach, Florida.

She had four daughters, Linda B. Miller of Palm Beach, Victoria B. Donaldson of Yorktown, New York, Priscilla P. Hallowell of Katonah, New York, and Electra P. Toub of New York City.

She died in New York City on October 28, 2011. She lived there at 580 Park Avenue, and her three-bedroom apartment sold in April 2012 for $5.8 million to Edward Shugrue III and his wife Greta.
