= Artemus Gates =

American businessman, naval aviator and Assistant Secretary of the Navy for Air

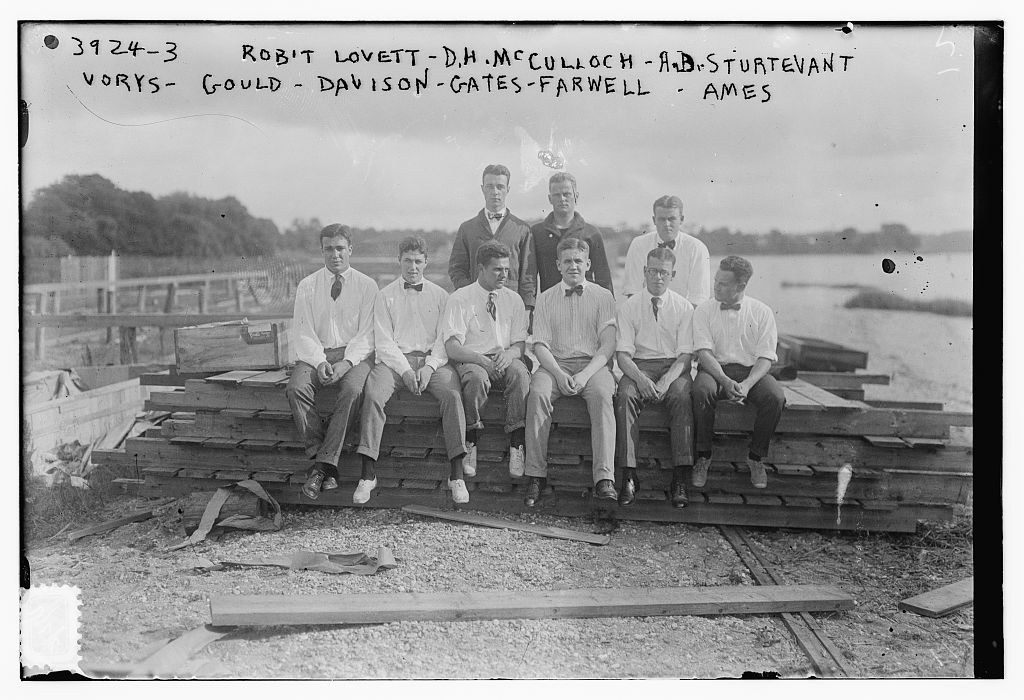

United States Under Secretary of the Navy
- In office July 3, 1945 – December 31, 1945
- Preceded by: Ralph Austin Bard
- Succeeded by: John L. Sullivan

Assistant Secretary of the Navy (AIR)
- In office September 5, 1941 – June 30, 1945
- Preceded by: David Sinton Ingalls
- Succeeded by: John L. Sullivan

Personal details
- Born: Artemus Lamb Gates; November 3, 1895
- Died: June 14, 1976 (aged 80)
- Resting place: Locust Valley Cemetery, Locust Valley, New York, U.S.
- Spouse: Alice Trubee Davison (m. 1922)
- Children: 2
- Parent: Chancy Lamb (great-grandfather)
- Education: Hotchkiss School; Yale University (BA)
- Profession: Businessman, naval aviator

Military service
- Allegiance: United States
- Branch/service: Naval Reserve Flying Corps
- Unit: First Yale Unit
- Battles/wars: World War I
- Awards: Navy Distinguished Service Medal; Distinguished Flying Cross; Croix de Guerre

Artemus Lamb Gates (November 3, 1895 – June 14, 1976) was an American businessman, naval aviator, and Assistant Secretary of the Navy for Air in charge of naval aviation efforts in World War II (December 7, 1941 – June 30, 1945). He also was briefly Undersecretary of the Navy (July 3, 1945 – September 2, 1945). He was, at various times, president of New York Trust Company, and a director of Union Pacific, Time, Boeing, Middle South Utilities, Safeway Inc., Abercrombie & Fitch Co., and Servo Corp.

== Background ==
A great-grandson of lumber baron Chancy Lamb and a grandson of lumber baron Artemus Lamb, he grew up at "Oakhurst" in Clinton, Iowa. He was graduated from Hotchkiss School in 1914 and received his B.A. degree as a member of the class of 1918 at Yale University. He was a member of Skull and Bones, one of the best known of the secret societies based at Yale University. Gates was captain-elect of the Yale football team in 1917.

== Military service ==
During World War I, the First Yale Unit of the Naval Reserve Flying Corps was closely associated with the Skull and Bones. The Yale Unit was often referred to snidely as the millionaire squadron. While training in Florida, the pilots often were wheeled to their planes in wheel chairs pushed by Black porters. Artemus Gates was a member of the Yale Unit. He helped rescue downed fliers, was shot down, taken prisoner by the Germans and escaped. Previous flying experience enabled him to become an ensign in naval aviation in March 1917. He was released from active service in February 1919, as lieutenant-commander. Because of service on the front, Mr. Gates was decorated by the United States government with the Navy Distinguished Service Medal, by Great Britain with the Distinguished Flying Cross, and by France with the Croix de Guerre and was made an officer of the Legion of Honor of France.

== Marriage ==
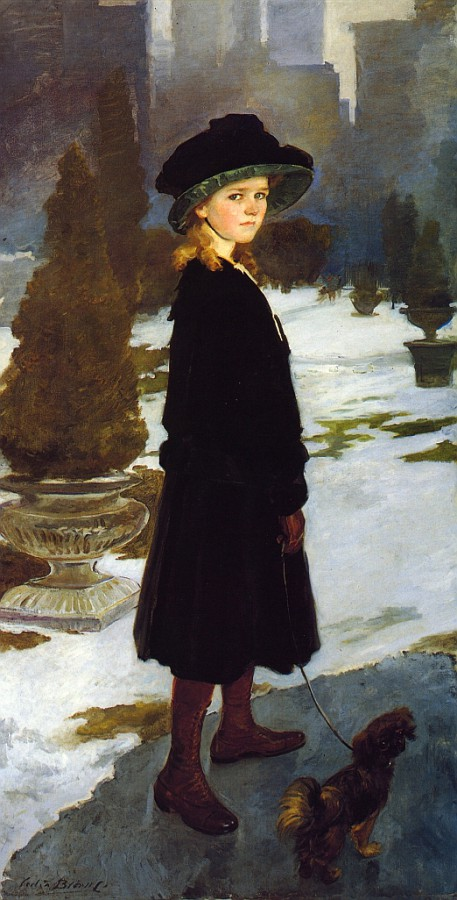
Alice Trubee Davison, 1909–10, by Cecilia Beaux

Gates married Alice Trubee Davison, a banking heiress and a sister of fellow Bonesman F. Trubee Davison, on January 3, 1922. They had two daughters, Diane and Cynthia.

Government offices
Preceded by David Sinton Ingalls	Assistant Secretary of the Navy; September 5, 1941 – June 30, 1945	Succeeded by John L. Sullivan
Preceded by Ralph Austin Bard	Under Secretary of the Navy; July 3, 1945 – December 31, 1945	Succeeded by John L. Sullivan
