= David Sinton Ingalls =

American politician

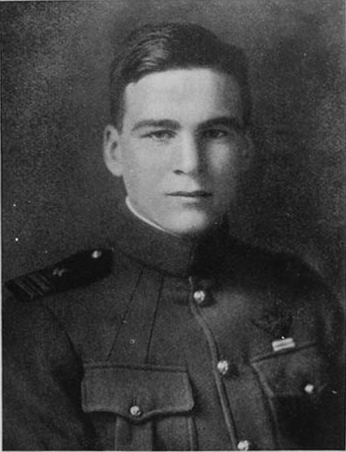
- Lieutenant David Ingalls c.1918

Assistant Secretary of the Navy (AIR)
- In office March 16, 1929 – June 1, 1932
- Preceded by: Edward Pearson Warner
- Succeeded by: Artemus Gates

Personal details
- Born: January 28, 1899 Cleveland, Ohio, U.S.
- Died: April 26, 1985 (aged 86) Chagrin Falls, Ohio, U.S.
- Party: Republican
- Children: Edith Ingalls Vignos; Jane Ingalls Davison; Louis Ingalls Brown; David Sinton Ingalls Jr.
- Parents: Albert Stimson Ingalls; Jane Ellison Taft Ingalls
- Education: University School; St. Paul's; Yale University; Harvard Law School

Military service
- Allegiance: United States
- Branch/service: United States Navy
- Years of service: 1917–1919; 1941–1945
- Rank: Rear Admiral
- Unit: No. 217 Squadron RAF (WWI); No. 213 Squadron RAF (WWI)
- Battles/wars: World War I World War II
- Awards: Distinguished Service Medal; Legion of Merit; Distinguished Flying Cross (UK); Legion d'Honneur (France)

David Sinton Ingalls (January 28, 1899 – April 26, 1985) was the US Navy's only flying ace of World War I, with six credited victories; thus he was the first ace in US Navy history.

== Early life ==
Ingalls was born on January 28, 1899, in Cleveland, Ohio. He was the son of Albert S. Ingalls and Jane (née Taft) Ingalls (1874–1962). His mother was the niece of U.S. President William Howard Taft. David was the grandson of railroad executive Melville E. Ingalls. and the great-grandson of industrialist David Sinton, for whom he was named.

Ingalls received his secondary education at the University School in Cleveland, and later attended St. Paul's School in Concord, New Hampshire. He entered Yale in 1916, where he studied as a medical student (he would eventually graduate in 1920 with a BA in English) and joined the First Yale Unit. As such, Ingalls became a member of the Naval Reserve Flying Corps and by 1917 had obtained his pilot's license.

Ingalls played for the Yale Bulldogs men's ice hockey team and was captain of the Boston Athletic Association ice hockey team during the 1921–22 season.

== Military career ==
On March 26, 1917, Ingalls was enlisted as Naval Aviator No. 85. He was called to active duty on 4 April 1917, two days before the American entry into World War I. Before heading to Europe, Ingalls received aviation training at West Palm Beach in Florida. On June 3, he was sent to Huntington, Long Island, New York for more training. His training was completed on 1 September 1917, and he was made a lieutenant (junior grade).

Ingalls arrived in Paris on September 12, 1917, and reported to the Commander of United States Naval Forces Operating in European waters in London on 10 December 1917 and was sent to the RFC training facility at RAF Gosport from December 13, 1917, until February 1918. From there, he went to the RFC Station in Ayr for squadron formation flying. On completion of this course, he was sent to Paris and arrived in Dunkirk on March 18, 1918. From Dunkirk he went to Clermont for a course in flying day bombing and gunnery. He arrived back in Dunkirk on July 2, where he was attached to 213 Squadron of the Royal Air Force.

=== Operational activity ===
Ingalls was attached to the British 213 Squadron and flew Sopwith Camels in attacks on German submarine bases. He was temporarily assigned to No. 218 Squadron RAF in July 1918 to gain experience flying bombers. Once back with 213 Squadron, Ingalls began tallying victories. On August 11, 1918, Ingalls and his flight leader, Colin Peter Brown, shot down a German observation plane behind enemy lines. Two days later, he was involved in a surprise attack on a German aerodrome, which destroyed thirty-eight planes. On 21 August, Ingalls shared a win over an LVG two-seater with Brown and fellow ace George Stacey Hodson.

On September 15, he destroyed a Rumpler in company with fellow ace Harry Smith. Three days later, he teamed with Smith and Hodson to become a balloon buster. Two days after that, Ingalls lost his engine and knew he had to crash land. As he was descending, he saw a woman sitting in a field smoking a pipe. He had never seen a woman smoking a pipe, so he tried to land in that field. Then his engine kicked back in and he was able to fly again. But by now he was well behind enemy lines. As a result, he was able to come at the Germans from behind and destroy a Fokker D.VII to become an ace. On a later attack on a German aerodrome, Ingalls destroyed more planes. On his way back to base on September 24, 1918, he spotted a German observation plane, which he and Hodson shot down. His last flight of the war came on October 3, 1918.

The following day, he headed home and was awarded the Navy Distinguished Service Medal for exceptionally and meritorious Service as chase pilot operating with No. 213 Squadron RAF while attached to the Northern Bombing Group. Ingalls was also decorated by Great Britain with the Distinguished Flying Cross and by France with the Legion of Honour. On 1 January 1919, he was also Mentioned in Despatches by the British. He was released from the military on January 2, 1919.He was credited with down six enemy aircraft making him an "ace"

== Post-war ==
Ingalls returned to Yale and received an LLD from Harvard in 1923. After graduating, he joined Squire, Sanders & Dempsey as an associate. In 1926, he was elected to the Ohio General Assembly, where he co-sponsored the Ohio Aviation Code. Ingalls also served as a member of the Ohio House of Representatives from 1927 to 1929. He was a good friend of Jack Towers, who recommended Ingalls for the job of Assistant Secretary of the Navy (AIR). He asked Newton Baker, a friend of his father to recommend him to Herbert Hoover. He got the job in early 1929. He became a good friend of Hoover, who invited him to the White House and to his camp. Fellow Skull and Bones member F. Trubee Davison would often accompany them. On his way home in his plane from Washington in June 1929, Ingalls crashed his plane into a fence, but was unharmed. As Assistant Secretary, he tripled the number of naval aircraft and pushed for a fully deployable carrier task force. In 1932, he embarked on an unsuccessful campaign to become Governor of Ohio. He left in 1933 to become director of Cleveland's Department of Public Health and Welfare.

In the mid-1930s, Ingalls was appointed a lieutenant commander in the Naval Reserves. He was made vice president and general manager of Pan Am Air Ferries in 1941. After the attack on Pearl Harbor by the Japanese, he helped develop the Naval Air Station at Honolulu, and ended up reporting for duty. In 1943, he became Chief of Staff for the Forward Area Air Center Command and later Commander of the Pearl Harbor Naval Air Station.

On his return to Ohio, he became a director of Pan Am World Airways and managed Robert A. Taft's campaign to be the Republican nominee for president in 1952. In 1954, he became president and publisher of the Cincinnati Times-Star and Vice Chairman of the now defunct Taft Broadcasting Company. He left the Cincinnati Times-Star in 1958 to practice law.

Ingalls was a friend of the aviator Charles Lindbergh, whom he helped solve navigation and communication problems in charting new air routes to the east for Pan Am.

He was a director of the Cleveland Trust Company, director of South Eleuthera Properties, Vice President of Virginia Hot Springs, Inc., President of the Central Eyebank for Sight Restoration, trustee of Laurel School and an honorary trustee of the Young Men's Christian Association.

== Personal life ==
He was married to Louise Hale Harkness (1898–1978), daughter of William L. Harkness and granddaughter of Daniel M. Harkness, who was instrumental in the formation of Standard Oil. Together, they were the parents of:

- Edith Ingalls (1923–2005), who married Dr. Paul Joseph Vignos Jr. (1919–2010), and became a prominent art collector.
- Louise Ingalls (1928–1998), who married Willard Walker Brown.
- David Sinton Ingalls Jr. (1934–1993), who became president of the Cleveland Museum of Natural History and mayor of Hunting Valley, Ohio.

Ingalls was a member of the American Legion, Chagrin Valley Hunt Club, Freemasons, Jekyll Island Club, Kirtland Country Club, Pepper Pike Club of Pepper Pike, Queen City Club of Cincinnati, River Club of New York, Skull and Bones and the Union Club of Cleveland.

Ingalls was a sportsman and a co-owner of two quail plantations: Ring Oak Plantation and Foshalee Plantation, which he shared with Robert Livingston Ireland Jr.

=== Legacy ===
The Ingalls Hockey Rink at Yale University is named after David Ingalls as well as his son, David S. Ingalls Jr. The Ingalls family were the primary benefactors of the rink.

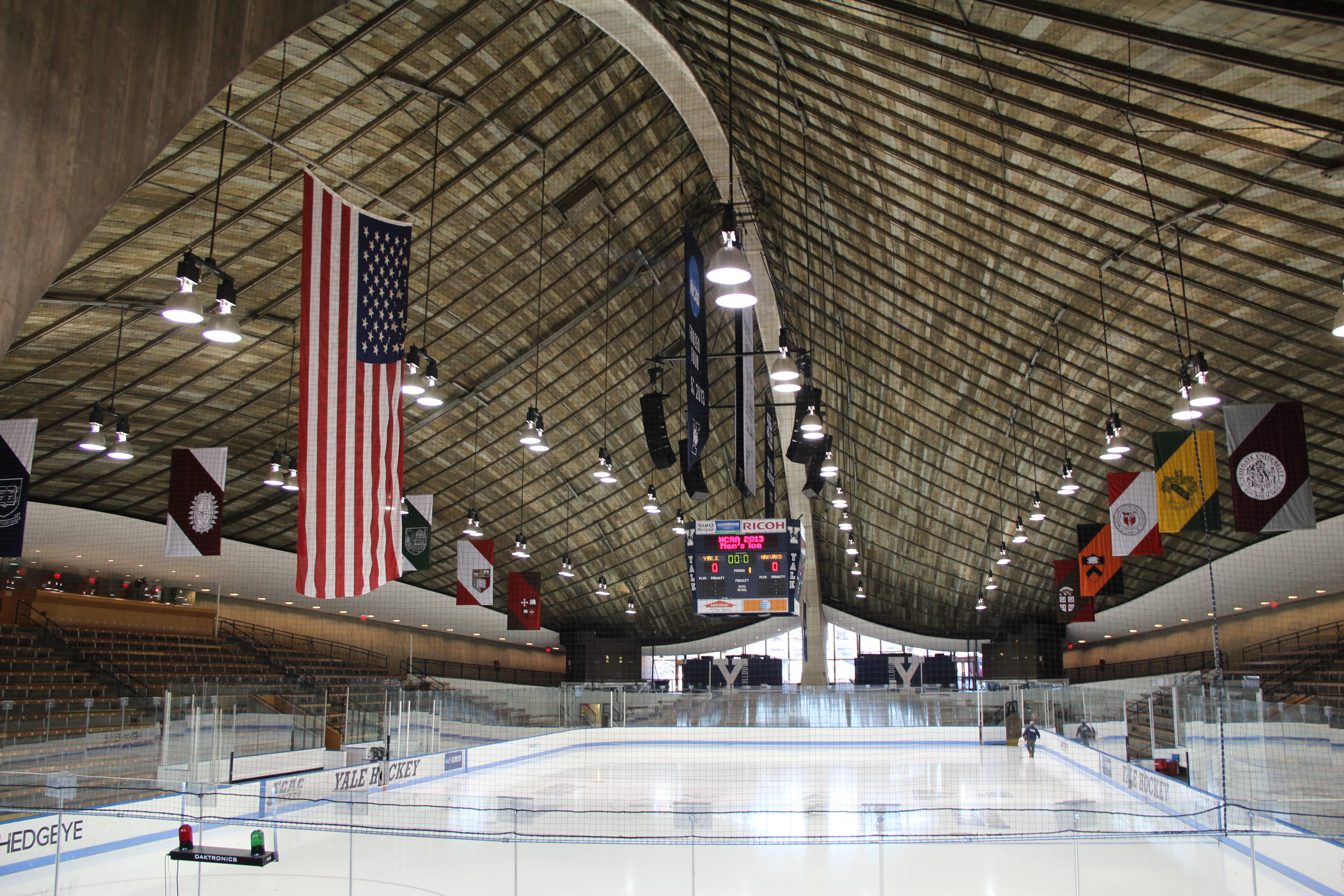
Ingalls Rink at Yale

In 1983, Ingalls was inducted into the National Aviation Hall of Fame in Dayton, Ohio. he died in 1985 in Ohio

In 2003, the Ingalls Foundation endowed the Paul J. and Edith Ingalls Vignos Curator of European Painting and Sculpture at the Cleveland Museum of Art.

== See also ==
- List of World War I flying aces from the United States

== Bibliography ==
- Airfields & Airmen of the Channel Coast: Battleground I Battleground Europe Series. Mike O'Connor, Michael O'Connor. Pen & Sword Books, 2006. ISBN 1-84415-258-8, ISBN 978-1-84415-258-2.
- Layman, R. D. (1993). "Question 15/91: Early USN Aircraft". Warship International. XXX (3): 318. ISSN 0043-0374.
- American Aces of World War I. Norman Franks, Harry Dempsey. Osprey Publishing, 2001. ISBN 1-84176-375-6, ISBN 978-1-84176-375-0.
- From Cotton To Quail: An Agricultural Chronicle of Leon County, Florida, 1860–1967, Paisley, Clifton. University of Florida Press, 1968. ISBN 978-0-8130-0718-2

Government offices
Preceded by Edward Pearson Warner	Assistant Secretary of the Navy (AIR); March 16, 1929 – June 1, 1932	Succeeded by Artemus Gates
Party political offices
Preceded by Myers Y. Cooper	Republican Party nominee for Governor of Ohio; 1932	Succeeded by Clarence J. Brown
