= Lewis Preston =

Lewis Preston may refer to:

- Lewis Thompson Preston (1926–1995), former President of the World Bank
- Lewis Preston (basketball) (born 1970), American college basketball coach
