= Charles L. Bartlett (journalist) =

American journalist (1921–2017)

- Born: August 14, 1921; Chicago, Illinois, US
- Died: February 17, 2017 (aged 95); Washington, D.C., US
- Occupation: Journalist
- Known for: 1956 Pulitzer Prize for National Reporting
- Relatives: Patsy Pulitzer (sister-in-law)

Charles Leffingwell Bartlett (August 14, 1921 – February 17, 2017) was an American journalist who won the 1956 Pulitzer Prize for National Reporting "for his original disclosures that led to the resignation of Harold E. Talbott as Secretary of the Air Force."

== Life ==
Bartlett was born in Chicago, Illinois, to Valentine Crouse Bartlett, a stockbroker, and Marie A. (Frost) Bartlett. Bartlett was a seventh-generation graduate of Yale University in 1943. He served in the Navy during World War II. He married Josephine Martha Buck on December 17, 1950.

Bartlett had a 65-year career in journalism and was a confidant to presidents John F. Kennedy and George Herbert Walker Bush. Bartlett and Stewart Alsop co-wrote an analysis of the Cuban Missile Crisis, "In Time of Crisis," that placed "hawks and doves" in American vernacular. The piece was published in the December 8, 1962, issue of the Saturday Evening Post.

Bartlett opened the Washington, D.C., bureau for the liberal-leaning Chattanooga Times. Later he was a syndicated columnist for the Chicago Sun-Times, and publisher of a political newsletter for private clients. He wrote for the Yale Daily News in college.

Bartlett has been credited with arranging the blind date that initiated the courtship of Jacqueline Bouvier and future President John F. Kennedy. The Bartlett and Kennedy families, both Catholic and immensely prosperous, had been social acquaintances over many years. Joseph Kennedy asked Bartlett to introduce John Kennedy to prospective brides to abet the aspiring politician's career. Bartlett had briefly dated the future First Lady. The Bartletts were part of the Kennedy wedding party in Newport, Rhode Island, and godparents to John F. Kennedy Jr.

Bartlett died in Washington, D.C., on February 17, 2017, at age 95, in his sleep from a heart ailment.

== Works ==
- Facing the brink : an intimate study of crisis diplomacy Hutchinson of London, [1969] OCLC 220455731
