= Robert Fair de Graff =

American book publisher and founder of Pocket Books

Robert Fair de Graff (1895-1981) was an American book publisher and founder of Pocket Books.

== Early life and education ==
Robert Fair de Graff was born in Plainfield, New Jersey.

He studied at the Hotchkiss School in Lakeville, Connecticut. Afterward, he went back to New Jersey where he worked repairing cars.

== Career ==
In 1922, he became a salesman for his cousin Nelson Doubleday's company, then known as Doubleday, Page and Company in Garden City, Long Island. By 1925, he had become president of Garden City Publishing Company, a subsidiary of Doubleday, Page and Company.

In 1939, de Graff founded Pocket Books with financial support from Simon & Schuster.

== Personal life and death ==
De Graff was married to Dorcas Marie Bomann when he died at his home in Mill Neck, Long Island, New York, in 1981 at the age of 86. Services were held at the Episcopal Church of St. John’s of Lattingtown in Locust Valley, Long Island. Robert is buried in Locust Valley Cemetery, Locust Valley, New York.

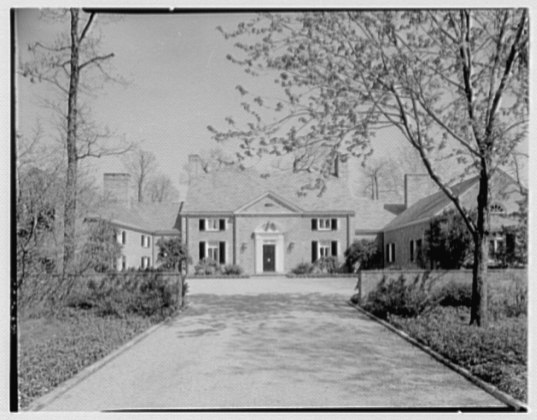
