= The Millionaires' Unit =

- Directed by: Darroch Greer, Ron King
- Written by: Darroch Greer
- Release date: 24 May 2015 (G.I. Film Festival)
- Running time: 120 minutes
- Countries: United States, New Zealand
- Language: English

The Millionaires' Unit is a 2015 American documentary film by Darroch Greer and Ron King about the First Yale Unit, a group of Yale college students who took the initiative to learn to fly in preparation for America's entry into the Great War. Based on a book by author Marc Wortman, the film is narrated by Academy Award-nominated actor Bruce Dern. It was filmed in the U.S., England, France, Belgium and New Zealand over the course of seven years. The documentary charts the romantic, little-known story of the origins of American airpower and features sequences filmed air-to-air with original WW1 planes.

== Release ==
The film won the Best Documentary Feature honor at the 2015 G.I. Film Festival and the Garden State Film Festival. It also screened at the Kansas City Film Festival, the Newport Beach Film Festival and the Julien Dubuque Film Festival, as well as at numerous museums and the Experimental Aircraft Association's AirVenture event.
