= 1932 Ohio gubernatorial election =

- November 8, 1932
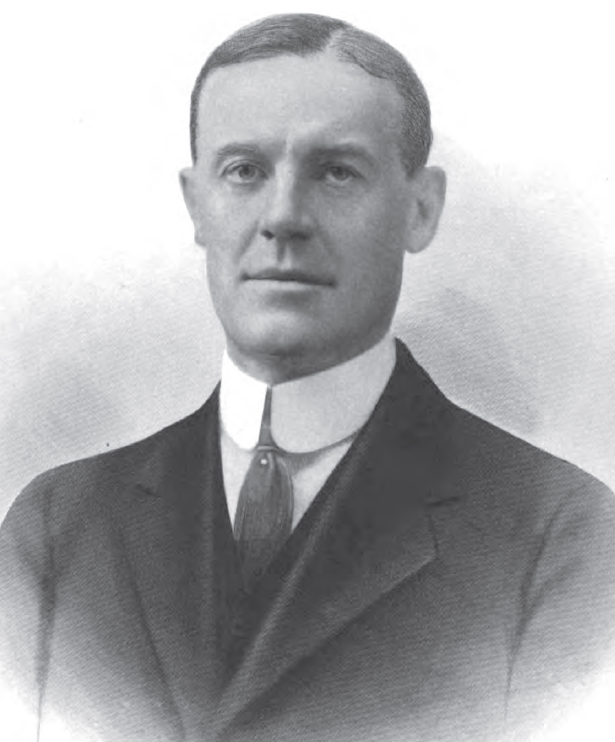

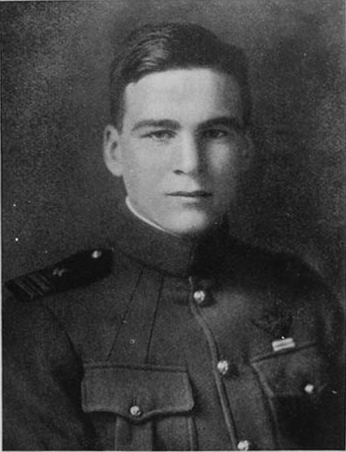
Nominee	George White	David Sinton Ingalls
Party	Democratic	Republican
Popular vote	1,356,518	1,151,933
Percentage	52.82%	44.85%
- County results White: 40–50% 50–60% 60–70% 70–80% Ingalls: 40–50% 50–60% 60–70%
Governor before election
George White
Democratic
Elected Governor
George White
Democratic

The 1932 Ohio gubernatorial election was held on November 8, 1932. Incumbent Democrat George White defeated Republican nominee David Sinton Ingalls with 52.82% of the vote.

== General election ==
=== Candidates ===
Major party candidates

- George White, Democratic
- David Sinton Ingalls, Republican

Other candidates

- Joseph Sharts, Socialist
- Aaron S. Watkins, Prohibition
- John Marshall, Communist
- William Woodhouse, Socialist Labor

=== Results ===
1932 Ohio gubernatorial election
Party	Candidate	Votes	%	±%
Democratic	George White (incumbent)	1,356,518	52.82%	
Republican	David Sinton Ingalls	1,151,933	44.85%	
Socialist	Joseph Sharts	32,288	1.26%	
Prohibition	Aaron S. Watkins	19,575	0.76%	
Communist	John Marshall	6,349	0.25%	
Socialist Labor	William Woodhouse	1,784	0.07%	
Majority		204,585		
Turnout				
Democratic hold		Swing		
