= Locust Valley Cemetery =

Cemetery in Locust Valley, New York

Locust Valley Cemetery (A Non-Denominational Long Island Cemetery)
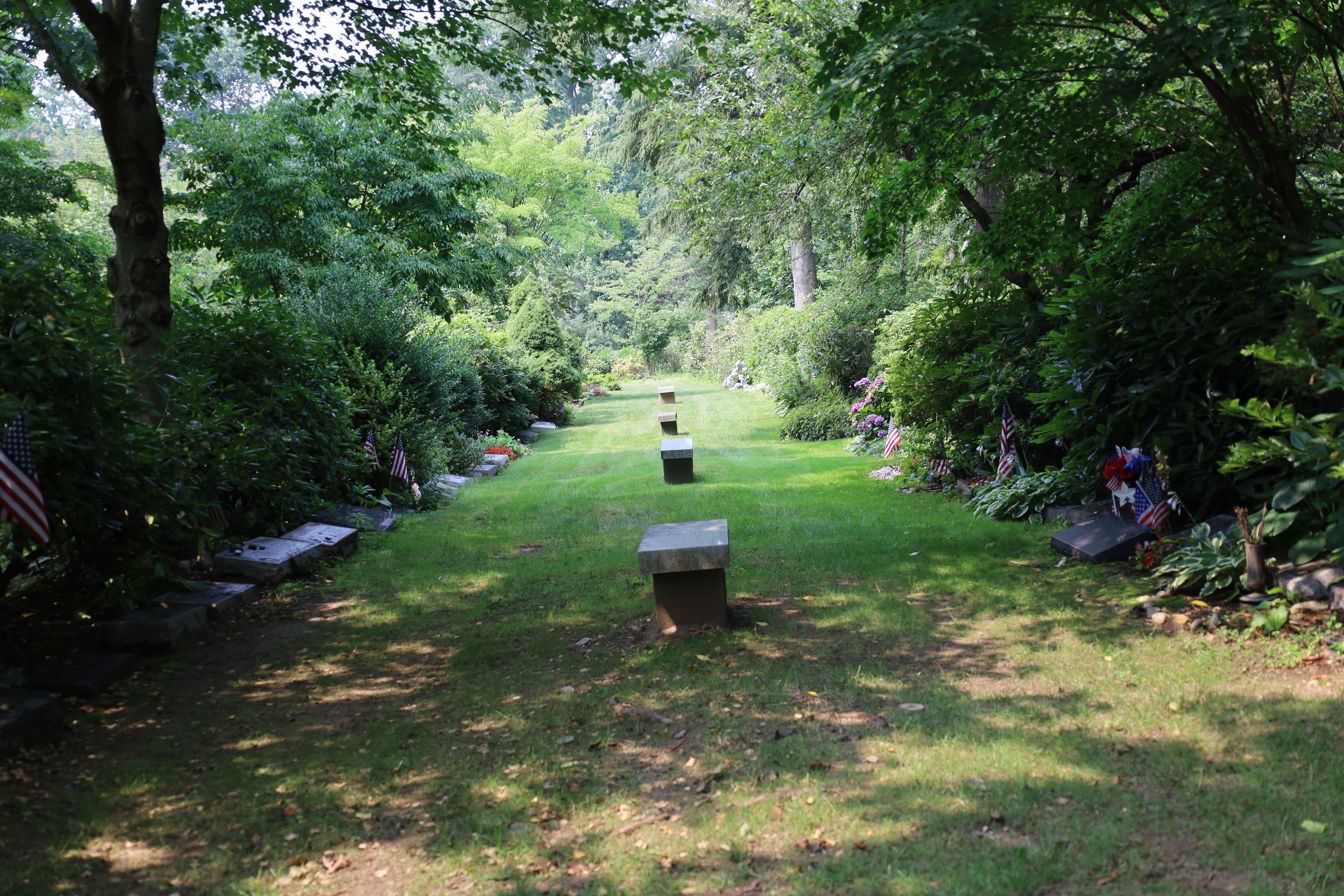
- Interactive map of Locust Valley Cemetery (A Non-Denominational Long Island Cemetery)

Details
- Established: 1917
- Location: 117 Ryefield Rd; Locust Valley, New York, Nassau County, New York
- Country: United States
- Coordinates: 40.882916°N 73.588403°W
- Type: Non-sectarian
- Owned by: Locust Valley Cemetery Association Inc.
- Size: 31 acres (13 ha)
- No. of graves: Over 9,000
- Website: www.lvcemetery.com
- Find a Grave: Locust Valley Cemetery
- The Political Graveyard: Locust Valley Cemetery

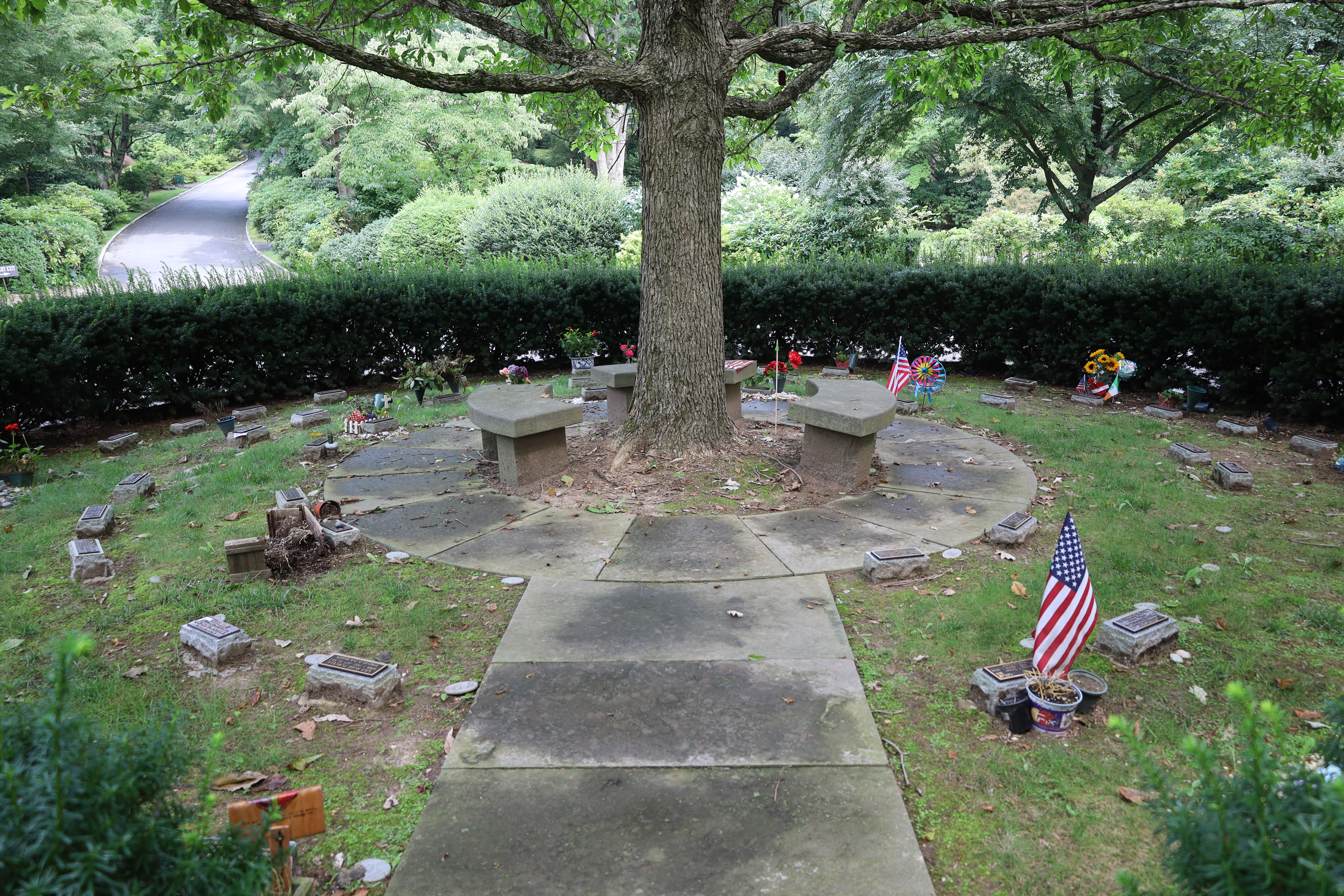
Memorial garden plots for urns

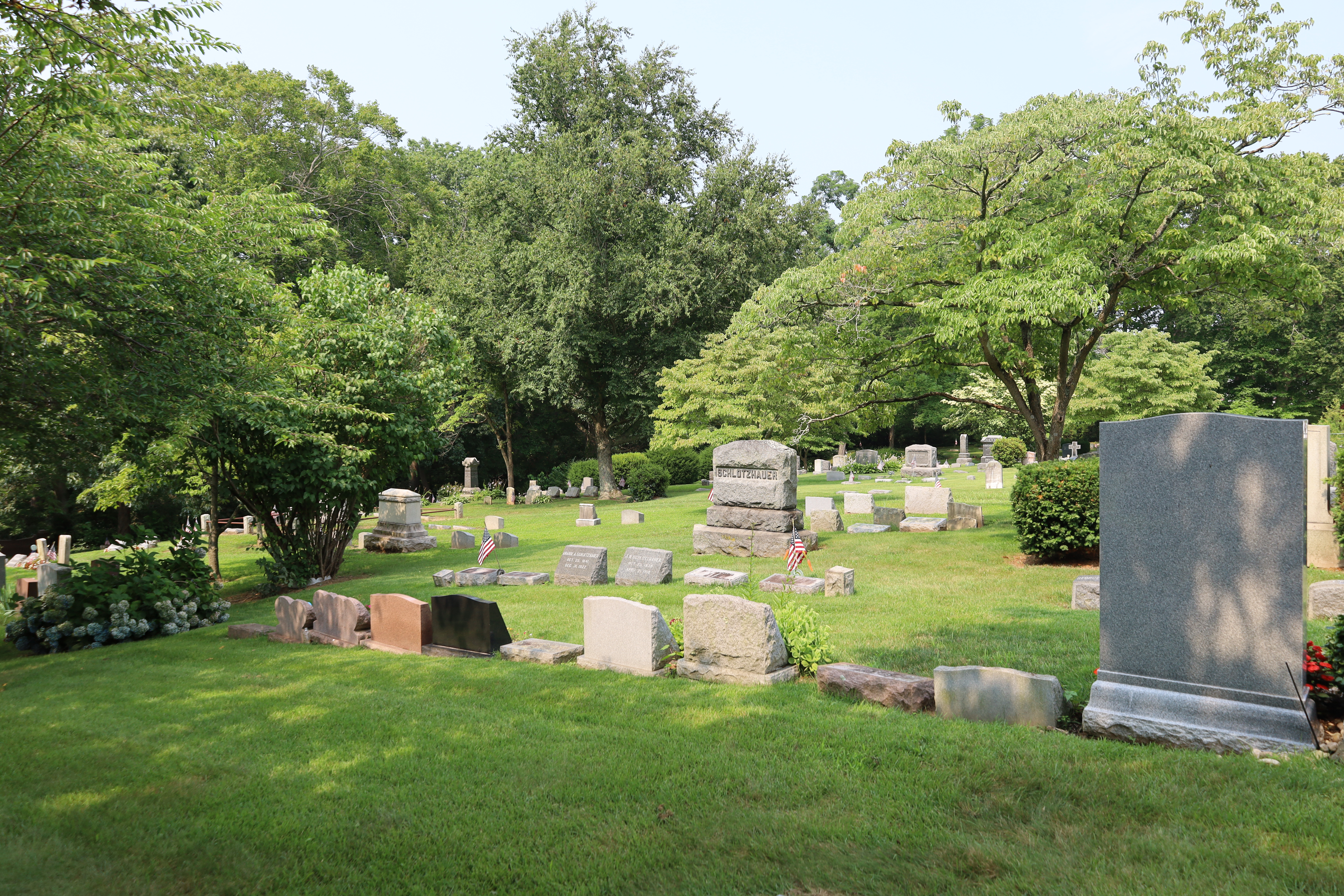
Old section of the cemetery

Locust Valley Cemetery is a non-denominational cemetery located in Locust Valley, New York, in Nassau County. The cemetery was founded in the nineteenth century and designed by John Charles Olmsted and Frederick Law Olmsted Jr., renowned architects of Central Park. They are the sons of the famed landscape designer Frederick Law Olmsted. The two brothers were among the founding members of the American Society of Landscape Architects (ASLA).

Locust Valley Cemetery is situated on over 32 lushly landscape acres with a park-like setting. The cemetery is owned by its plot holders and managed by an association.

== History ==
Locust Valley Cemetery Association Inc. was incorporated 1917, and a perpetual care fund was established to preserve its natural beauty. Today, that fund is still supported by proceeds from interment sales as well as donations. The principal of the endowment can never be violated based on the laws of New York State.

This 32-acre property is listed on the Smithsonian Register of American Gardens.

== Notable interments ==
- Edith Bouvier Beale, First cousin of Jacqueline Kennedy Onassis and Lee Radziwill
- Robert Abercrombie Lovett (September 14, 1895 Ð May 7, 1986) Fourth United States Secretary of Defense
- Patsy Pulitzer (1928–2011), fashion model, socialite and philanthropist, wife of Lewis Thompson Preston
- William J. Tully, (1870-1930) New York state Senator
- John W. Davis, served as a United States representative from West Virginia from 1911 to 1913, then as Solicitor General of the United States and US Ambassador to the UK under President Woodrow Wilson.
- F. Trubee Davison as an American World War I aviator, Assistant United States Secretary of War, Director of Personnel for the Central Intelligence Agency, and President of the American Museum of Natural History.
- William Dameron Guthrie, Guthrie Shaped the surrounding community. Early purchase of Lattingtown in what is now Lattingtown Harbor in the late 19th, early 20th centuries. Guthrie successfully carried out the fight against US Federal income tax until 1913 He was a big financial backer of the Matinecock Neighborhood Association, which in turn supported our fire department, library and worked in conjunction with our school system. The village was officially incorporated in 1931 with William Guthrie as mayor and town offices located at Meudon.
- Rocky Graziano, an American professional boxer and one of the greatest knockout artists in boxing history. He is interred at the Cemetery along with his wife, Norma Unger.
- Ray Goulding, an American actor and comedian who worked together with Bob Elliott and formed the comedy duo of Bob and Ray.
- Leroy Randle “Roy” Grumman, an American aeronautical engineer and co-founder of Grumman Aeronautical Engineering Co., later renamed Grumman Aerospace Corporation.
- Edward Francis Hutton, American financier and co-founder of E. F. Hutton & Co., one of the largest financial firms in the United States.
- Mona von Bismarck, American socialite, fashion icon and philanthropist.
- Arthur Vining Davis, American industrialist and philanthropist.
- Franklin Nelson Doubleday, Publisher.
- Ava Lowle Willing, Lady Ribblesdale (1868-1958), Socialite, First wife of John Jacob Astor IV.
- James Blanchard Clews, was an American railroad executive and banker.
- Whitey Ford, pitcher for the New York Yankees from 1950 to 1967 who won the 1961 Cy Young Award and was inducted into the Baseball Hall of Fame in 1974.
- Ray Lumpp, professional basketball player
- John M. Franklin, United States Army general and the president of United States Lines.
- Robert "Tex" Allen, American actor in both feature films and B-movie westerns between 1935 and 1944. Buried with his wife Evelyn Peirce American film actress during the silent film era, and into the 1930s.
- Lisa Kirk, American actress and singer noted for her comic talents and rich contralto.
- Philip Albright Small Franklin, President and chairman of International Mercantile Marine Company (IMM) from 1916 to 1936.
- Harry Payne Bingham, American financier, sportsman, art patron and philanthropist. He funded a series of expeditions to study marine life.
- Edna Woolman Chase, American who served as editor-in-chief of Vogue magazine from 1914 to 1952.
- Charles Steele, American lawyer and philanthropist who was a member of J.P. Morgan & Co. for 39 years.
- Harrison Williams, American entrepreneur, investor, and multi-millionaire, and third husband of Mona von Bismarck.
- William Robertson Coe, Insurance, railroad and business executive, a major owner and breeder of Thoroughbred racehorses, as well as a collector of Americana and an important philanthropist for the academic discipline of American Studies.
- Devereux Milburn, American champion polo player in the early to mid-twentieth century. He was one of a group of Americans known as the Big Four in international polo, winning the Westchester Cup six times.
- Ilka Chase, was an American actress, radio host, and novelist.
- Artemus Gates, was an American businessman, naval aviator, and Assistant Secretary of the Navy.
- Charles Lawrance, was an American aeronautical engineer and an early proponent of air-cooled aircraft engines.
- Dr Andrey N. Avinoff, was an internationally known artist, lepidopterist, museum director, professor, bibliophile and iconographer, who served as the director of the Carnegie Museum of Natural History in Pittsburgh from 1926 to 1945.
- Allan Aloysius Ryan Jr., was an American financier and politician from New York.
- Paul Drennan Cravath, was a prominent Manhattan lawyer and presiding partner of the New York law firm Cravath, Swaine & Moore.He devised the Cravath System, was a leader in the Atlantist movement, and was a founding member and director of the Council on Foreign Relations.
- John G. Milburn, was a prominent lawyer in Buffalo, New York and New York City, a president of the New York City Bar Association, and a partner at the law firm Carter Ledyard & Milburn.
- Anson Wood Burchard, was an American businessman. He was the vice-chairman of General Electric and the chairman of General Electric International, having served many years as a vice president of General Electric. In addition, he was a director for several public utility companies.
- Joseph Wright Harriman, was the president of Harriman National Bank and Trust Company. He was the nephew of railroad tycoon Edward H. Harriman and cousin of diplomat, statesman and future New York Governor W. Averell Harriman.
- Charles Albert Coffin, was an American businessman who was the co-founder and first president of General Electric corporation.
- Priscilla Johnson McMillan, was an American journalist, translator, author, and historian. She was a Center Associate at the Davis Center for Russian and Eurasian Studies at Harvard University.
- Myron Charles Taylor, was an American industrialist, and later a diplomat involved in many of the most important geopolitical events during and after World War II.
- Willard Underhill Taylor, was a lawyer, New York City real estate investor, and brother of Myron Charles Taylor. Willard was also a member of the Saint Nicholas Society of the City of New York and the President of the Underhill Society of America between 1932 and 1940.
- Charles Augustus Stone, was an early electrical engineer and graduate from the Massachusetts Institute of Technology. He co-founded Stone & Webster with his friend Edwin S. Webster. He served as chairman of the company for many years.
- Edward R. Stettinius, was an American executive. He was president of Diamond Match Company in Barberton, Ohio, for a time. After the start of World War I, he worked at J. P. Morgan and Company coordinating the purchase of war supplies for the Allies. When the United States entered the war, he went to work in its War Department.
- Lyman Hine, was an American bobsledder who competed in the late 1920s. Born in Brooklyn, New York, he won a silver medal in the five-man bobsleigh event at the 1928 Winter Olympics in St. Moritz.
- Robert Scott Lovett, was an American lawyer and railroad executive. He was president and chairman of the board of the Union Pacific Railroad and a Director of both The National City Bank of New York and Western Union.
- Alexandra Gardiner Creel, was a member of the Gardiner family, who were prominent bankers and landowners, known for their ownership of 3,300-acre (13 km2) Gardiners Island, located off the eastern tip of Long Island, New York.
- Elizabeth Shoumatoff, was a portrait painter who painted the Unfinished portrait of Franklin D. Roosevelt. Other paintings of White House residents include portraits of President Lyndon B. Johnson and Lady Bird Johnson.
- Leo Dewey Welch, was an American banker and oilman who served as a senior official with several major corporations.
- Benjamin W. Downing, was an American lawyer from New York.
- Martin Richards, was an American film producer.
- Mary Lea Johnson Richards, was an American heiress, entrepreneur, and Broadway producer. She was a granddaughter of Robert Wood Johnson I (co-founder of Johnson & Johnson).
- Robert Fryer, was an American theatrical and film producer.
- Mervyn Nelson, was a stage actor, writer, director and producer.
- William Goadby Loew, was a Manhattan stockbroker and financier.
- Robert Fair de Graff, was an American book publisher and founder of Pocket Books.
- Sharman Douglas, was an American socialite known for her friendship with the British royal family, in particular Princess Margaret.
- John Barry, was an English composer and conductor of film music.

== See also ==
- List of cemeteries in New York
- National Register of Historic Places in Oyster Bay, New York
