= Henry Pomeroy Davison =

American banker (1867–1922)

Henry Pomeroy Davison Sr.
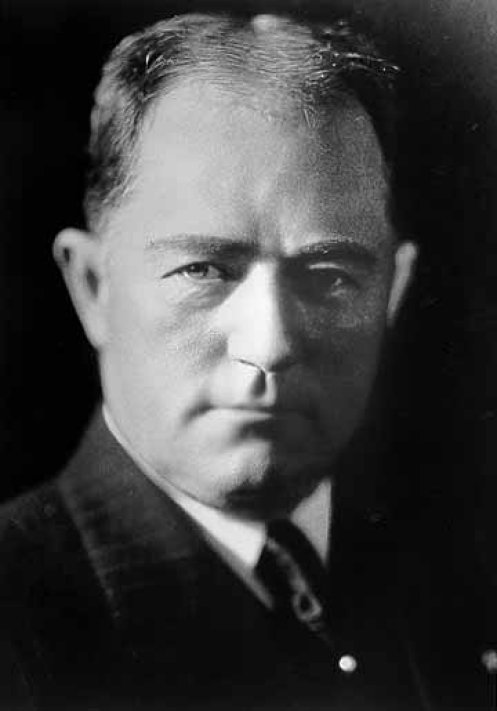
- Born: June 12, 1867; Troy, Pennsylvania, U.S.
- Died: May 6, 1922 (aged 54); Locust Valley, New York, U.S.
- Spouse: Mary Kate Trubee (m. 1893)
- Children: 4, including Frederick Trubee Davison

Henry Pomeroy Davison Sr. (June 12, 1867 – May 6, 1922) was an American banker and philanthropist.

== Biography ==
Henry Pomeroy Davison was born on June 12, 1867, in Troy, Pennsylvania, the oldest of the four children of Henrietta and George B. Davison. Henry's mother died when he was nine years old in 1877.

== Career ==
After completing his education he became a bookkeeper in a bank managed by one of his relatives, and at age 21 he gained employment at a bank in Bridgeport, Connecticut, the hometown of his wife. Three years later he moved to New York City, where he was employed by the Astor Place Bank, and sometime later became president of the Liberty National Bank. Several years later he was involved in the founding and formation of the Bankers Trust Company. In 1909 he became a senior partner at JP Morgan & Company, and in 1910 he was a participant in the secretive meeting on Jekyll Island, Georgia that laid the foundation for the creation of the Federal Reserve system in 1913.

=== Involvement with the Red Cross ===
After the United States entered World War I in 1917, Davison was named chairman of the War Council of the American Red Cross. In this capacity, he led a campaign to win financial support for the Red Cross, quickly raising four million dollars used to fund Red Cross ambulances. In recognition of his service he was awarded the Distinguished Service Medal, one of the few civilians so honored.

After the war ended, he pressed for the creation of an international organization to coordinate the work of the different national Red Cross societies. Based on his recommendation, the League of Red Cross Societies was founded on May 15, 1919, by the societies of Great Britain, France, Japan, Italy, and the United States. Davison, wanted the League of Red Cross Societies to supersede the International Committee of the Red Cross (ICRC) in controlling the Red Cross action in international affairs. He argued that:

It should be in reality, and not merely in name an International Committee, a Committee on which there will be representatives from all countries, instead of, as at present, a committee consisting of amiable but somewhat ineffective Geneva gentlemen. That which calls itself "international" has grown rather provincial… New blood, new methods, a new and more comprehensive outlook, these things are necessary.

The League was established in 1919 with Davison as its chairman. However, "Swiss aloofness or unilateralism was hard to overcome", and the relationship between the ICRC and the League became, and remained, a problem for years to come.

In 1919, Davison published The American Red Cross in the Great War, a book describing the wartime activities of the Red Cross. He remained chairman of the league until his death in 1922.

The International Federation of Red Cross and Red Crescent Societies (the league's name since 1991) grants the Henry Davison Award in his memory.

== Personal life ==
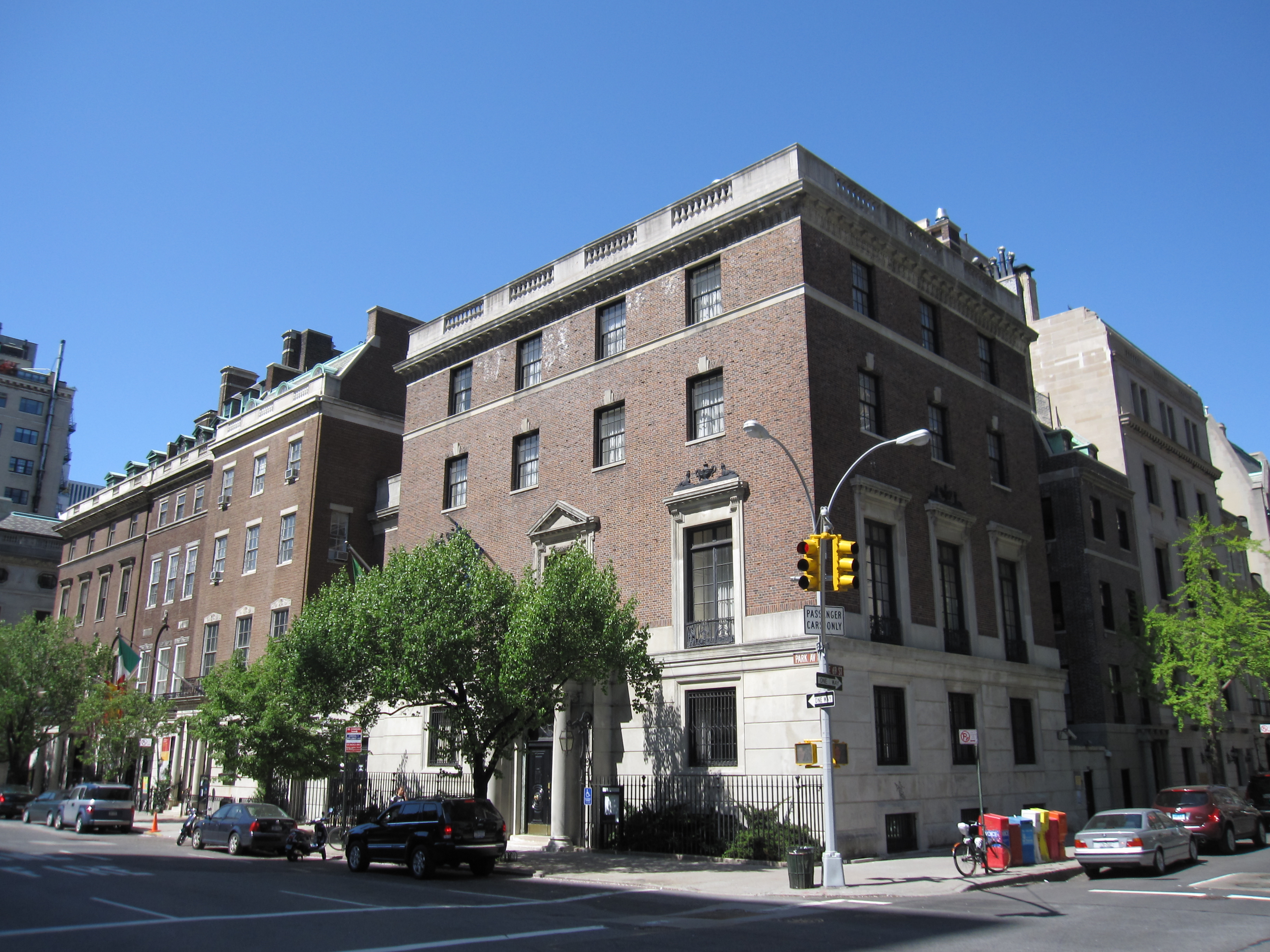
Davison's home in New York at 690 Park Avenue and East 69th Street, designed by Walker & Gillette in 1917.

On April 13, 1893, he married Kate Trubee (1871–1961). Together, they had two sons, and two daughters:

- Frederick Trubee Davison (1896–1974), was a WWI pilot, lawyer, NY legislator, cabinet member, and director of personnel for the Central Intelligence Agency
- Henry Pomeroy Davison Jr. (1898–1961), was a director at Time magazine who married Anne Stillman (1902–1987), daughter of James A. Stillman
- Alice Trubee Davison (1899–1983), who married Artemus Lamb Gates (1895–1976) in 1922
- Frances Pomeroy Davison (1903–1969), who married Ward Cheney, a son of Charles Cheney, a partner at J.P. Morgan & Company, in 1926.

Davison died on May 6, 1922, at the age of 54 at his family estate, Peacock Point in Locust Valley, Long Island, while undergoing an operation to remove a brain tumor. He had undergone two prior failed brain operations. He left the bulk of his estate to his wife to be held in trust.

Non-profit organization positions
Preceded by None	Chairman of the International League of Red Cross Societies; 1919–1922	Succeeded by John Barton Payne
