= Pocket Books =

American publisher

- Parent company: Simon & Schuster
- Founded: 1939; 87 years ago
- Founder: Richard L. Simon; M. Lincoln Schuster; Robert Fair de Graff
- Country of origin: United States
- Headquarters location: 1230 Avenue of the Americas, Rockefeller Center, New York City
- Official website: www.pocketbooks.com

Pocket Books is a division of Simon & Schuster that primarily publishes paperback books.

== History ==
Pocket Books produced the first mass-market, pocket-sized paperback books in the United States in early 1939 and revolutionized the publishing industry. The German Albatross Books had pioneered the idea of a line of color-coded paperback editions in 1931 under Kurt Enoch, and Penguin Books in Britain had refined the idea in 1935 and had one million books in print by the following year.

Penguin's success inspired entrepreneur Robert Fair de Graff, who partnered with publishers Richard L. Simon, M. Lincoln ("Max") Schuster and Leon Shimkin of Simon & Schuster to bring the concept to the American market by founding Pocket Books. Priced at 25 cents and featuring the logo of Gertrude the kangaroo (named after the mother-in-law of the artist, Frank Lieberman), Pocket Books' editorial policy of reprints of light literature, popular non-fiction, and mysteries was coordinated with its strategy of selling books outside the traditional distribution channels. The small format size, 4.25 by 6.5 in (10.8 by 16.5 cm) and the fact that the books were glued rather than stitched, were cost-cutting innovations.

The first ten numbered Pocket Book titles published in May 1939 with a print run of about 10,000 copies each:

1. Lost Horizon by James Hilton
2. Wake Up and Live by Dorothea Brande
3. Five Great Tragedies by William Shakespeare
4. Topper by Thorne Smith
5. The Murder of Roger Ackroyd by Agatha Christie
6. Enough Rope by Dorothy Parker
7. Wuthering Heights by Emily Brontë
8. The Way of All Flesh by Samuel Butler
9. The Bridge of San Luis Rey by Thornton Wilder
10. Bambi by Felix Salten

This list includes seven novels, the most recent being six years old (Lost Horizon, 1933), two classics (Shakespeare and Wuthering Heights, both out of copyright), one mystery novel, one book of poetry (Enough Rope), and one self-help book.

The edition of Wuthering Heights hit the bestseller list, and by the end of the first week sold out of its initial 100,000 copy run. By the end of the year Pocket Books had sold more than 1.5 million units. Robert de Graff continued to refine his selections with movie tie-ins and greater emphasis on mystery novels, particularly those of Christie and Erle Stanley Gardner.

Pocket and its imitators thrived during World War II because material shortages worked to their advantage. During the war, Pocket sued Avon Books for copyright infringement: among other issues, a New York state court found Pocket did not have an exclusive right to the pocket-sized format (both Pocket and Avon published paperback editions of Leslie Charteris' The Saint mystery series, among others).

In 1944, the founding owners sold the company to Marshall Field III, owner of the Chicago Sun newspaper. Following Field's death in 1957, Leon Shimkin, a Simon & Schuster partner, and James M. Jacobson bought Pocket Books for $5 million. Simon & Schuster acquired Pocket in 1966.

Phyllis E. Grann who would later become the first woman CEO of a major publishing firm was promoted to run Pocket Books under then CEO Richard E. Snyder. Grann left for Putnam in 1976.

In 1981, Dr. Benjamin Spock's Baby and Child Care was listed as their top seller, having sold 28 million copies at that time and having been acquired in 1946.

In 1989, The Dieter by Susan Sussman became the first hardcover published by Pocket Books.

Pocket was for many years known for publishing works of popular fiction based on movies or TV series, such as the Star Trek franchise (owned by former corporate siblings CBS Television Studios and Paramount Pictures). Since first obtaining the Star Trek license from Bantam Books in 1979 (with a publication of the novelization of Star Trek: The Motion Picture), Pocket has published hundreds of original and adapted works based upon the franchise and continues to publish a new novel every month. Beginning in 2017 with novels based on Star Trek: Discovery, the Star Trek novel lines have gradually moved to Simon & Schuster's Gallery Books line.

Pocket also previously published novels based on Buffy the Vampire Slayer. The author credited for one of the Buffy products is Gertrude Pocket, a reference to the company's kangaroo logo. (The Buffy novels are now published by Simon Spotlight Entertainment, another division of Simon & Schuster.) Pocket Books is also the division that currently owns publication rights to the well-known work of James O'Barr, The Crow.

== Imprints ==
- Baen Books — science fiction and fantasy (distributed), including the Honor Harrington series
- Cardinal Edition
- Downtown Press — chick lit
- Gallery Books
- G-Unit Books
- Juno Books — formerly an imprint of Wildside Press
- MTV/VH1 Books
- Paraview Pocket Books
- Permabooks
- Pocket Star Books — media tie in, eBooks
- Threshold Editions — conservative titles
- WWE Books

=== Defunct imprints ===
- Sonnet—romance
- Timescape Books - science fiction
- Wanderer Books
