= First Yale Unit =

First naval air reserve unit in the USA

The First Yale Unit, also known as the Yale Aero Club (formally designated Aerial Coast Patrol No. 1), was originally a student airplane flying club started by Yale University sophomore F. Trubee Davison in June 1916. Davison and 11 other Yale students were fascinated with the possibilities of aviation in general and of naval aviation specifically. After meeting with Admiral Robert Peary to gain military authorization for the unit, Trubee Davison acquired a Curtiss Model F flying boat and members of the First Yale Unit were trained as pilots during the summer of 1916. They were subsequently used as the first U.S. aerial coastal patrol unit. The First Yale Unit considered to be the first U.S. naval air reserve unit.

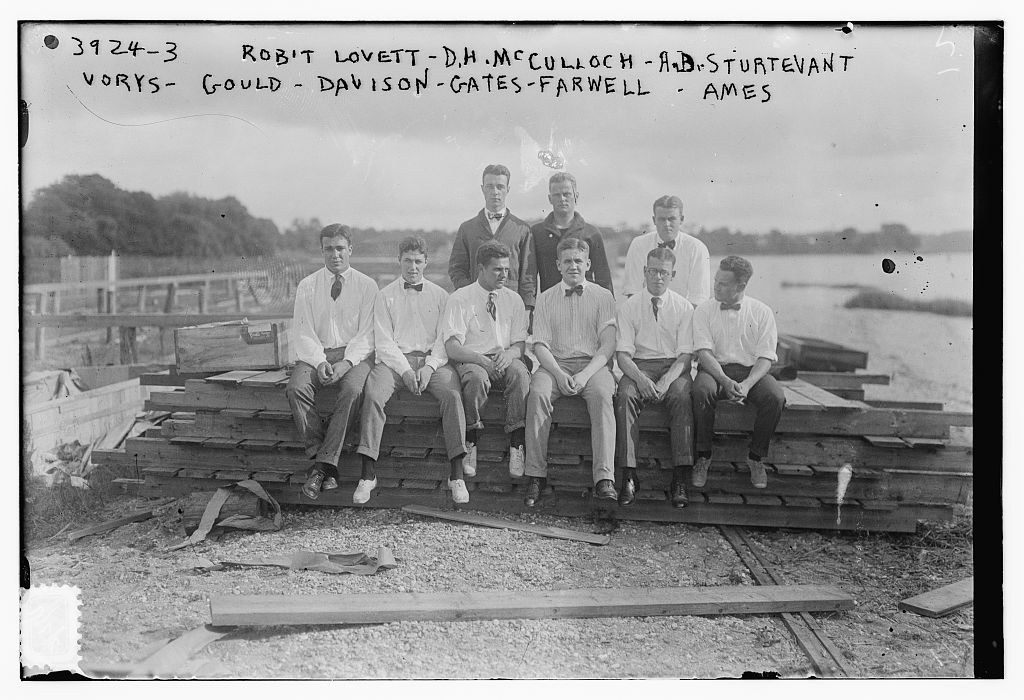
Robert Abercrombie Lovett (1895–1986), David Hugh McCulloch (1890–1955), Albert Dillon Sturtevant (1894–1918), John Martin Vorys (1896–1968), Rear Admiral Earl Clinton Barker Gould (1895–1968), Frederick Trubee Davison (1896–1974), Artemus Lamb Gates (1895–1976), John Villiers Farwell III (1895–1992), and Allan Wallace Ames (1893–1966) in July 1916 at Port Washington, New York.

Although they were still civilians and volunteers, the Yale students now had an official mission. On August 29, 1916, Congress passed the Naval Reserve Appropriations Act and established the Naval Reserve Flying Corps. In March 1917, 13 days before the United States entered World War I, the First Yale Unit volunteers enlisted en masse in the Naval Reserve Flying Corps and began war training at West Palm Beach.

From this small group of 29 emerged an assistant secretary of war, an assistant secretary of the navy, an under secretary of the navy, and a secretary of defense. Founder F. Trubee Davidson was injured in a crash during training and never saw combat. However, he went on to become the director of the Civil Aeronautics Board. Lt. David Ingalls later flew a Sopwith Camel airplane with the RAF, the first US naval aviator to become a flying ace, and the only to achieve this feat during WWI. He later served as Assistant Secretary of the U.S. Navy. Two other First Yale Unit members, Robert Lovett and Artemus Gates, became commandants of the army and navy air corps, respectively.

The story of the First Yale Unit is chronicled in the 2015 documentary film The Millionaire's Unit, based on author Marc Wortman's book of the same name.
