= Palm Beach Day Academy =

Coordinates: 26°41′49″N 80°3′2″W

- 1901 South Flagler Drive; West Palm Beach, FL 33401 (Pre-K-3); 241 Seaview Avenue; Palm Beach, FL 33480 (4-8); United States

Information
- Type: Independent, non-sectarian
- Established: 1921
- Head of school: Fanning M. Hearon III
- Faculty: 79
- Grades: Pre-K-8
- Enrollment: 422
- Average class size: 6:1
- Colors: Blue and gold
- Mascot: Bulldog
- Website: www.pbday.org

Palm Beach Day Academy is a coeducational independent day school located in Palm Beach and West Palm Beach, Florida, U.S. It enrolls students between age 2 and grade 8.

== History ==
Founded in 1921, Palm Beach Day Academy is the oldest incorporated independent school in Florida. Palm Beach Day Academy is incorporated as a non-sectarian, not-for-profit school. It has been a member of the National Association of Independent Schools since 1957 and is evaluated and accredited by the Florida Council of Independent Schools and the Florida Kindergarten Council.

It was previously known as the Palm Beach Day School before it merged with the Academy of The Palm Beaches in 2007. In 2023, the school graduated its final class of ninth graders.
