= Robert A. Lovett =

American politician (1895–1986)

Robert Lovett
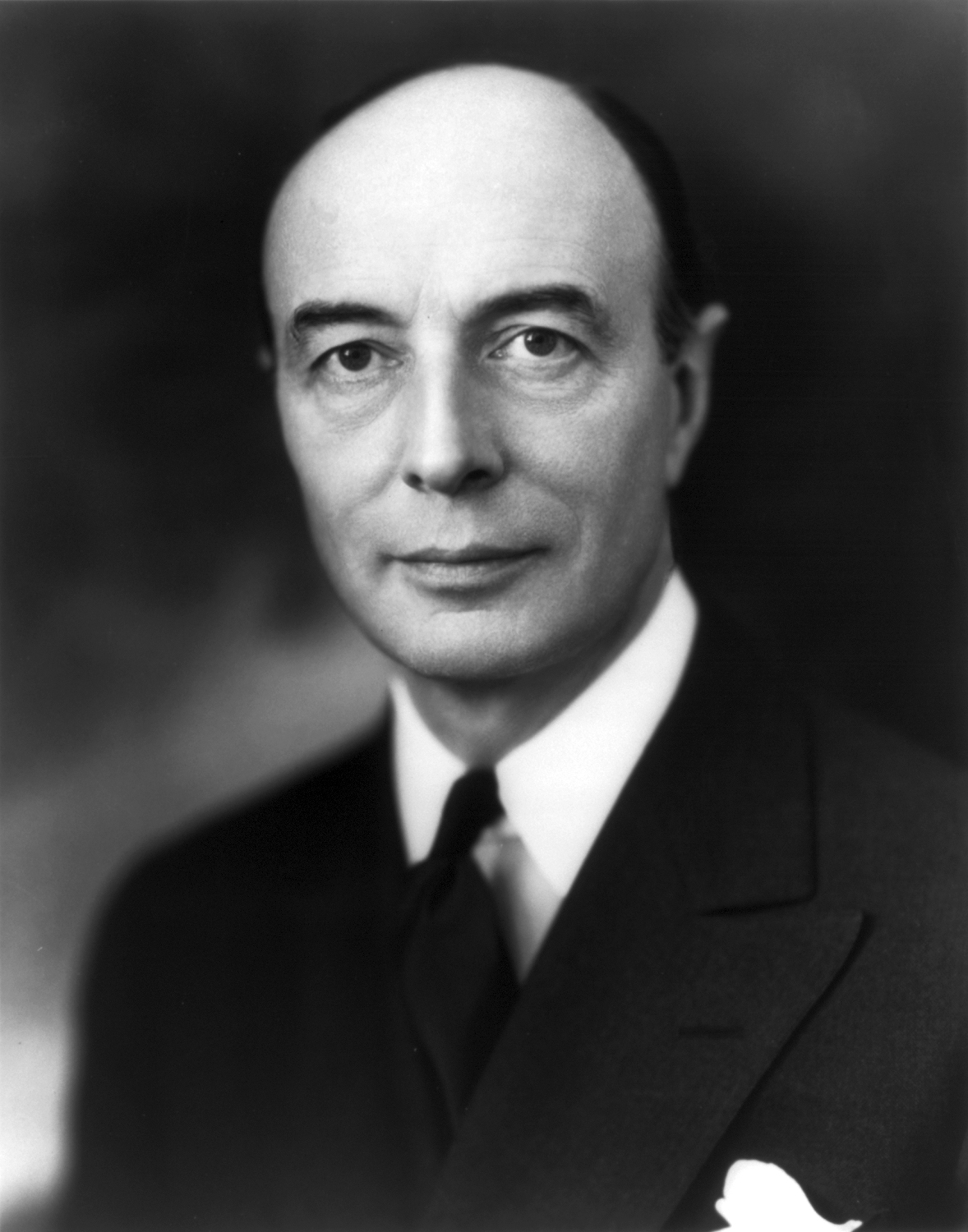
- Lovett in 1943

4th United States Secretary of Defense
- In office September 17, 1951 – January 20, 1953
- President: Harry S. Truman
- Preceded by: George Marshall
- Succeeded by: Charles Wilson

2nd United States Deputy Secretary of Defense
- In office October 4, 1950 – September 16, 1951
- President: Harry S. Truman
- Preceded by: Stephen Early
- Succeeded by: William Foster

15th United States Under Secretary of State
- In office July 1, 1947 – January 20, 1949
- President: Harry S. Truman
- Preceded by: Dean Acheson
- Succeeded by: James E. Webb

2nd Assistant Secretary of War for Air
- In office April 10, 1941 – December 8, 1945
- President: Franklin D. Roosevelt; Harry S. Truman
- Preceded by: F. Trubee Davison (1933)
- Succeeded by: Stuart Symington

Personal details
- Born: Robert Abercrombie Lovett; September 14, 1895 Huntsville, Texas, U.S.
- Died: May 7, 1986 (aged 90) Locust Valley, New York, U.S.
- Resting place: Locust Valley Cemetery
- Party: Republican
- Spouse: Adele Quartley Brown (m. 1919)
- Relations: Leonard A. Abercrombie (grandfather)
- Children: 2
- Parent: Robert S. Lovett (father)
- Education: Yale University (BA); Harvard University (attended)

Military service
- Allegiance: United States
- Branch/service: United States Navy
- Years of service: 1918–1919
- Rank: Lieutenant Commander
- Unit: First Yale Unit
- Battles/wars: World War I

Robert Abercrombie Lovett (September 14, 1895 – May 7, 1986) was an American politician who served as the fourth United States secretary of defense, having been promoted to this position from Deputy Secretary of Defense. He served in the cabinet of President Harry S. Truman from 1951 to 1953 and in this capacity, directed the Korean War. As Under Secretary of State, he handled most of the tasks of the State Department while George C. Marshall was secretary.

Lovett was a core member of the group of foreign policy elders known as "The Wise Men", and was deemed an "architect of the cold war" by social scientist G. William Domhoff, in his 1970 book, The Higher Circles: The Governing Class in America.

== Early life and education ==
Lovett was born on September 14, 1895, in Huntsville, Texas, to Robert S. Lovett, president and chairman of the board of the Union Pacific Railroad and a director of both The National City Bank of New York and Western Union.

Lovett graduated from The Hill School in Pottstown, Pennsylvania, in 1914. He was a member of the Skull and Bones society at Yale University, where he graduated in 1918. From 1919 to 1921, Lovett undertook postgraduate studies in law, then business administration, at Harvard University.

== Career ==
=== Military service ===
A member of the First Yale Unit, Lovett became a naval ensign during World War I. A passionate aviator, He flew with the British Naval Air Service on patrol and combat missions, and then commanded a US naval air squadron, achieving the rank of lieutenant commander. He remained interested in aeronautics, especially in European commercial and military aviation.

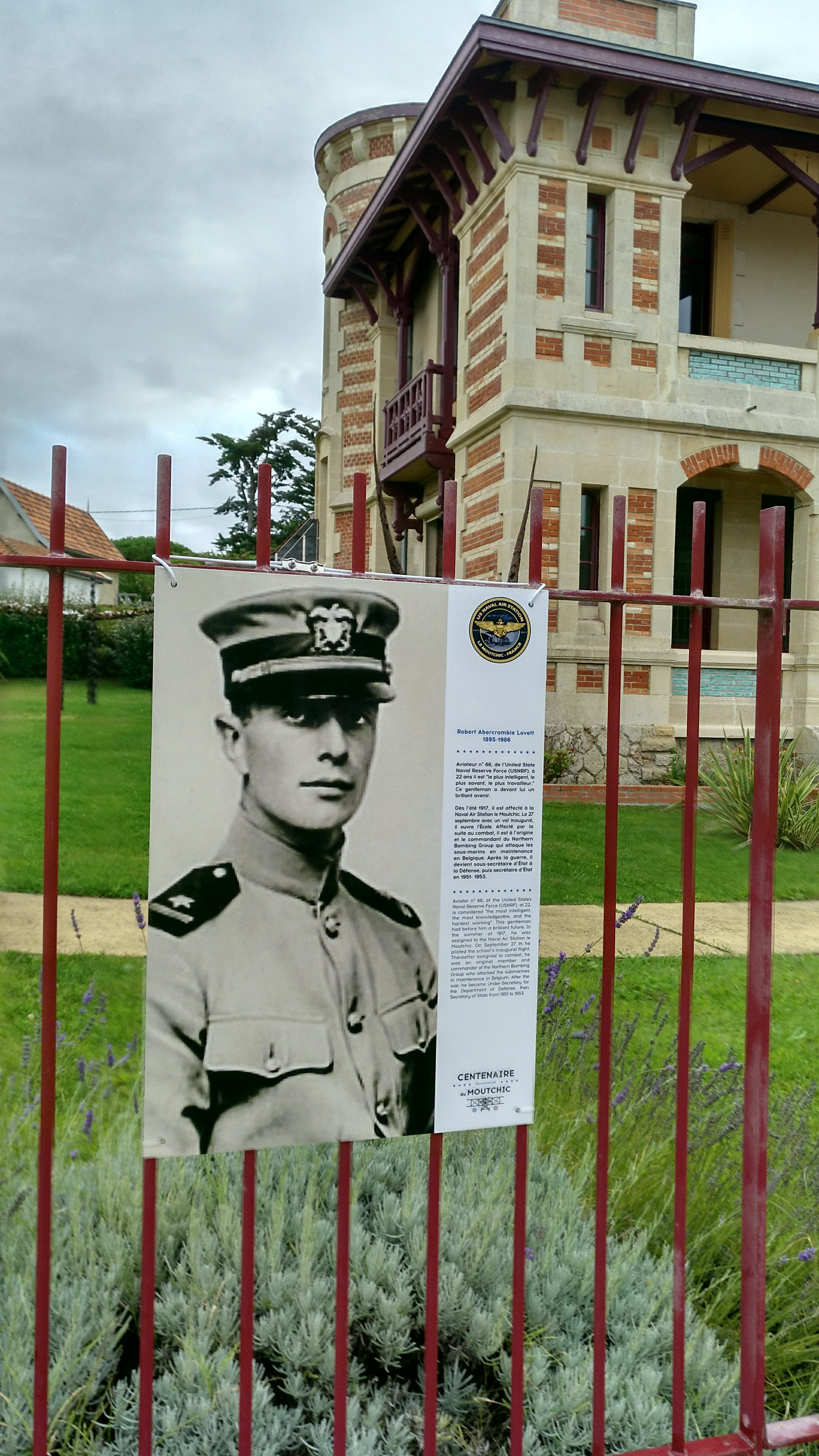
Information board about Robert A. Lovett (later US Secretary of Defense) in Lacanau France 2017 (100 years of Naval Air Station Le Moutchic)

=== Industry ===
Lovett "joined his father's banking firm in 1921," later moving to his wife's family's banking firm, Brown Brothers Harriman, where he became a partner in 1926. Beginning in the 1930s, Lovett was an intermittent director of Freeport Sulphur for more than 25 years.

=== Politics ===
In December 1940, Lovett was appointed special assistant for air affairs to Secretary of War Henry L. Stimson. At the same time, John J. McCloy became general assistant secretary, and Harvey H. Bundy became special assistant to the secretary of war. In April 1941, Lovett was named assistant secretary of war for air, a position that had been vacant since Franklin D. Roosevelt's 1933 inauguration as president. Lovett served with distinction, overseeing the massive expansion of the Army Air Forces and the procurement of huge numbers of aircraft during World War II. In awarding Lovett the Army's Distinguished Service Medal in September 1945, President Harry Truman wrote, "He has truly been the eyes, ears and hands of the Secretary of War in respect to the growth of that enormous American airpower which has astonished the world and played such a large part in bringing the war to a speedy and successful conclusion."

President Truman refused to accept the resignation of Lovett and McCloy when they and Bundy gave their resignations in September 1945. On October 22, 1945, Secretary of War Robert Patterson created the Lovett Committee, chaired by Robert A. Lovett, to advise the government on the post-World War II organization of US intelligence activities, which led to the creation of the CIA.

In December 1945, Lovett returned to Brown Brothers Harriman, only to be called back to Washington a little more than a year later to serve with General George Marshall as undersecretary of state. Through dialogue with Senator Arthur Vandenberg, he helped draft the Vandenberg resolution, which led to the establishment of NATO. Marshall was in poor health and had never been a workaholic. He turned over major responsibilities to his deputies, especially Lovett, and refused to be troubled by minutiae. By 1948, with frailties building up, Marshall's participation was further curtailed. He said, "The fact of the matter is that Lovett bears the principal burden as I get away whenever possible."

In January 1949, Lovett went back to his investment business. Marshall insisted for Lovett to join him again when he took over at the Pentagon as Secretary of Defense in September 1950. As deputy secretary of defense to Marshall, Lovett again played the major role in the department's management. When Lovett became Secretary of Defense, the end of the Korean War was not yet in sight. His main concern continued to be the long-range rearmament program. Like Marshall, Lovett believed that the United States erred seriously at the end of World War II by disintegrating the military. He had also joined Marshall in opposing the recognition of the new state of Israel in 1948 because he thought it was contrary to long-term US strategic interests in the region.

When the Korean War unexpectedly broke out, he designed a massive rearmament program intended both to meet the demands of the limited war and to serve as a deterrent and mobilization base in future military emergencies. As Lovett put it, "Heretofore this country has only had two throttle settings: one, wide-open for war, and the other, tight-shut for peace. What we are really trying to do is to find a cruising speed." Lovett argued for large monetary budgets to carry on the Korean War and to improve US defensive strength, asking for large sums of money and arguing strenuously against additional congressional cuts, emphasizing the need to expand Army, Navy, and Marine Corps forces. He argued toward working toward a goal of 143 Air Force wings (as compared with 95 then authorized) and a larger military. Lovett did not get all that he wanted. The actual amount his department received for 1953 came to about $44.2 billion, almost $13 billion less than the previous year. He had asked for initially $71 billion, later reducing his requests to $49 billion.

Lovett's efforts to meet rearmament and preparedness goals suffered in 1952 from a major dispute between the federal government and the steel industry. Truman tried to avert a threatened strike, caused mainly by a wage dispute, by taking over the steel mills in April 1952. The strike occurred after the Supreme Court held that Truman's seizure order was unconstitutional. Lovett supported the president's action as essential to maintaining defense production and expressed serious concern about the strike's effects on the nation's military capabilities. Even so, he noted that "the last six months of 1952 saw the most significant increases in the military effectiveness of the United States since the beginning of partial mobilization."

By the end of the Truman administration, the Defense Department had met successfully the challenges of the Korean War mobilization and embarked on a long-term preparedness effort. Besides the preparedness issue, Lovett inherited a number of other matters that were still unresolved in the early 1950s, including the proper military role of nuclear weapons. Lovett's stands on the nuclear weapons question and other major military issues generally followed those of his predecessors. He strongly supported universal military training, regarding it as the only viable long-term approach to building a reserve force, and thus making possible a smaller regular military establishment. A firm proponent of NATO, he played an important role when the NATO Council in February 1952 adopted force goals totaling 50 divisions and 4,000 aircraft to be achieved at the end of 1952.

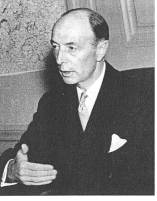
Assistant Secretary of War Lovett attended to the Air Force's role in developing international outer space law.

Despite a relatively smooth administration, Lovett felt a growing dissatisfaction with the existing defense organization. Although he recognized that real unification could result only from an evolutionary process, not from legislative edict, as the end of his term approached, he discerned the need for changes in the National Security Act beyond those made in 1949. Commenting about unification at a press conference a week before he left office, Lovett observed that the Department of Defense would have to be reorganized substantially if the United States became involved in a major conflict. He put forward his recommendations in a long letter to President Truman on November 18, 1952, proposing clarification of the secretary of defense's relationship to the president, the Joint Chiefs of Staff, and the military departments; redefinition of JCS functions; reorganization of the military departments; and reorganization and redefinition of the functions of the Munitions Board and the Research and Development Board.

Lovett meant his recommendations for practical consideration by his successor, and they indeed played an important role in the formulation of a reorganization plan during the early months of the Eisenhower administration. Concerned about the need for an orderly post-election changeover in the Department of Defense, Lovett met several times during the transition period with the incoming secretary, Charles E. Wilson, and made sure that he was thoroughly briefed on current issues. Lovett's diaries while he was Under Secretary of State (1947–1949) are available in the Brown Brothers Harriman Collection, housed in the manuscripts collection at New-York Historical Society.

== Personal life ==
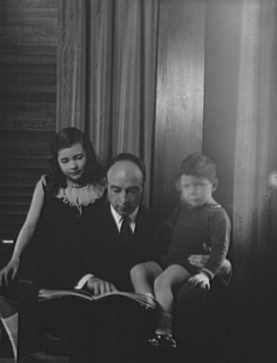
Lovett and his children at home in 1930

On April 19, 1919, Lovett married debutante Adele Quartley Brown, daughter of James Brown (1863–1935), a descendant of Alexander Brown (1764—1834) and the New York Brown banking family that, in 1931, would merge with another Wall Street firm, Harriman Brothers & Company, forming Brown Brothers Harriman & Co., and Adele Quartley (1866 – 1954), daughter of famed seascape painter, Arthur Quartley; the couple had two children.

== Later life and death ==
After Lovett left office on January 20, 1953, he returned again to Brown Brothers Harriman, where he remained active as a general partner for many years. Lovett has been recognized as one of the most capable administrators to hold the office of secretary of defense and as a perceptive critic of defense organization. His work in completing the Korean War mobilization and in planning and implementing the long-range rearmament program, as well as his proposals to restructure the Department of Defense, were among his major contributions. His work for the U.S. Government was not yet quite completed. By January 1956, U.S. President Dwight D. Eisenhower persuaded Lovett to take on a part-time job with the brand new President's Board of Consultants on Foreign Intelligence Activities which, years later, would become known as the President's Intelligence Advisory Board.

Following the 1960 presidential election, Joseph P. Kennedy – who had served with Lovett on the President's Board of Consultants – advised his son John F. Kennedy to offer Lovett any U.S. Cabinet post he might desire. Lovett graciously declined, citing health reasons. In 1963, he received the Presidential Medal of Freedom, with Distinction. In 1964, he was awarded the prestigious Sylvanus Thayer Award by the United States Military Academy for his service to the country. G. William Domhoff—who described Lovett, Harvey Bundy and John McCloy as having a close working relationship; and credited John F. Kennedy as accepting Lovett's advice to appoint Dean Rusk as Secretary of State, Robert S. McNamara as Defense Secretary, and C. Douglas Dillon as Treasury Secretary in 1961.

Lovett died in Locust Valley, New York, on May 7, 1986, at the age of 90. He was preceded in death by his wife, Adele, on January 4, 1986. Both outlived their children, Evelyn Springer Lovett Brown (1920–1967) and Robert Scott Lovett, II (1927–1984). They were interred in Locust Valley Cemetery there. The Department of History at Yale University, his alma mater, has the Robert A. Lovett Chair of Military and Naval History in his honor. Its current incumbent is John Lewis Gaddis, the noted historian of the Cold War.

Political offices
Vacant Title last held by F. Trubee Davison; 1933	Assistant Secretary of War for Air; 1941–1945	Succeeded by Stuart Symington
Preceded by Dean Acheson	United States Under Secretary of State; 1947–1949	Succeeded by James E. Webb
Preceded by Stephen Early	United States Deputy Secretary of Defense; 1950–1951	Succeeded by William Foster
Preceded by George Marshall	United States Secretary of Defense; 1951–1953	Succeeded by Charles Wilson
Awards
Preceded by John J. McCloy	Recipient of the Sylvanus Thayer Award; 1964	Succeeded by James B. Conant
