= Chancy Lamb =

Chancy R. Lamb
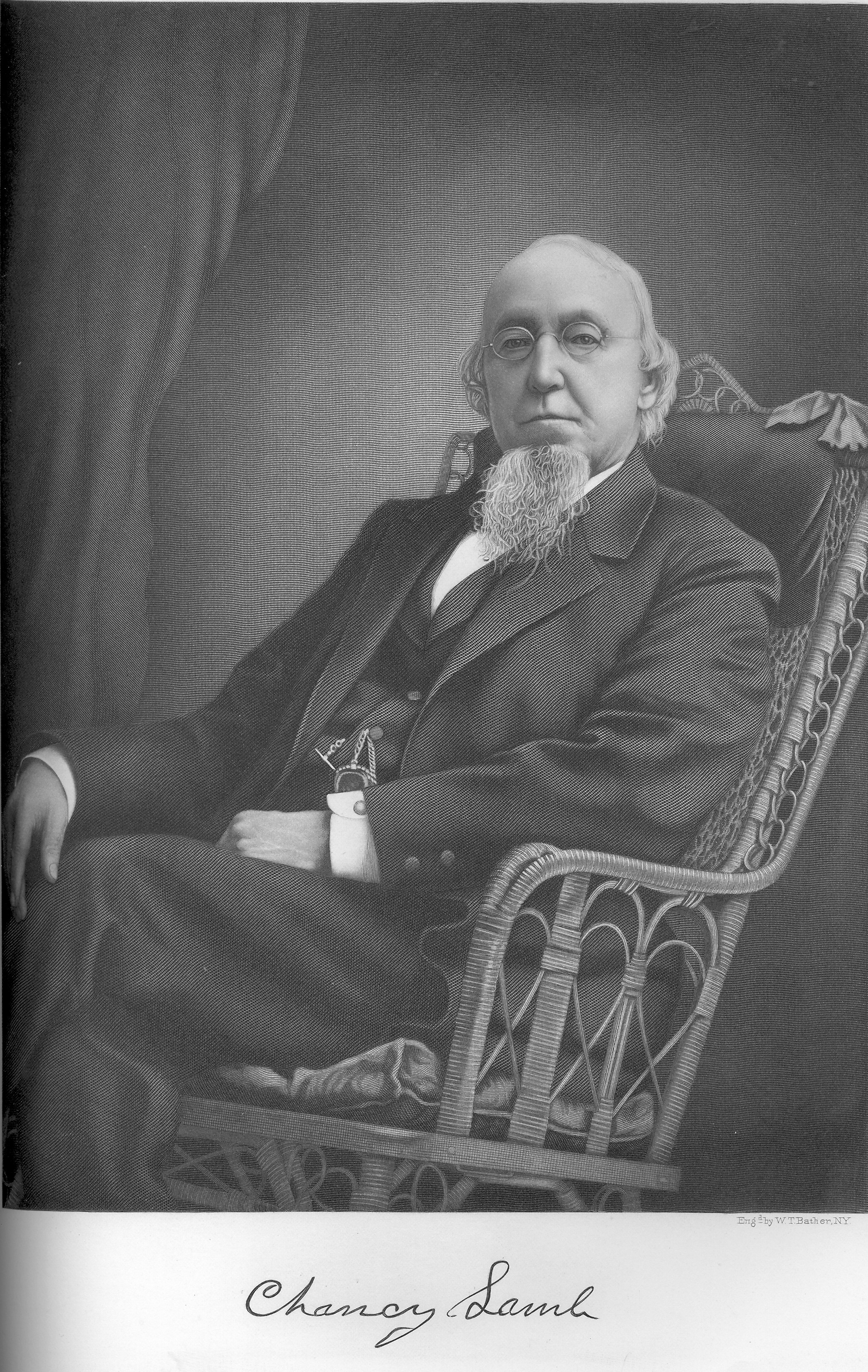
- Portrait of Chancy Lamb
- Born: 4 January 1816; Ticonderoga, New York
- Died: 12 July 1897 (aged 81); Clinton, Iowa
- Occupation(s): Industrialist, lumber baron
- Spouse: Jane Bevier
- Children: Artemus, Augusta, Lafayette, Emma, Celeste, Merrette
- Parent(s): Alpheus Lamb & Sophia Bailey

Chancy Lamb was a pioneer in the lumber industry in Clinton, Iowa.

== Early life ==
Chancy Lamb was born in Ticonderoga, New York, January 4, 1816. He was the son of Alpheus and Mrs. Sophia (Bailey – Wilkerson) Lamb. His father was a descendant of Thomas Lamb, who came from England with Governor Winthrop’s fleet in 1630, and settled at Roxbury, Massachusetts. Chancy Lamb spent his early life on a farm, enjoying an occasional winter of schooling in the common schools of the neighborhood. In 1836 he went to Benton, New York, where he engaged in the manufacture of wagons, and, as well, learned the trade of millwright. Two years later, in 1838, he moved to Bradford, New York, where he went to work in a saw mill, and for the next three years was thus engaged, the larger portion of the time sawing by the thousand. In the summer of 1841 he commenced the construction of a saw mill on the outlet of Lake Keuka, near Penn Yan, New York for R.L. Chapman of Steuben County, New York completing it in the spring of 1842, during which season he operated the mill under contract with the owner. In November of that year he returned with his family to Bradford, where he took a contract to run the saw mill of Cameron, Thurman & Co., and continued in the capacity of superintendent with this firm until the summer of 1844, when he moved with his family to Carroll county, Illinois, where he spent several years in farming.

In 1851 he moved to Williamsport, Pennsylvania, and accepted the position of superintendent in the mill operations of his former employer, J.C. Cameron & Co., and in the following year operated the mills of this company in Chemung County, New York, sawing by the thousand and continuing in this business for the next five years.

== Move to Clinton, Iowa ==
In November, 1856, Lamb again moved west, and for a few months was a resident of Fulton, Illinois, but in 1857 he took possession of the saw mill at Clinton, which he purchased from Gray & Lunt, and which he had helped to build. This mill burned October 6, 1857, and Lamb at once erected a much better mill, which he operated until November 14, 1876, when it, too, was destroyed by fire. In March, 1868, he laid the foundations of a stone structure saw mill, which went into commission in September of the same year, which, with the rebuilt mill which replaced the one which was burned, and the subsequent acquisition of the Cobb mill and Wheeler & Warner mill, produced about 100,000,000 board feet (200,000 m^{3}) of lumber and 50,000,000 shingles a year.

== Innovation ==
Lamb was one of the most progressive men in the trade, and it is claimed that he was the first man to use the band saw in the manufacture of white pine lumber, his practical experience readily discerning the value of so economical a device, which, in its experimental stages, others were hesitant about testing. He was also among the first to employ steam-boats in the towing of log rafts upon the Mississippi for the more expeditious, as well as more economical method over the prevailing custom of floating with the current. He from time to time built what may be termed a full fleet of steam-boats expressly for the towing business.

== Sons in the business ==
In 1864 his son, Artemus Lamb, and in 1873 another son, Lafayette Lamb, were taken into partnership with their father, and in January, 1878, articles of incorporation were taken out under the name of C. Lamb & Sons.

== Other business interests ==
Mr. Lamb was from the first, president of C. Lamb & Sons, incorporated; was also president of the Clinton Savings Bank, and a director in various companies, including the Mississippi River Logging Company; the Mississippi River Lumber Company; the Shell Lake Lumber Company; the People’s Trust & Savings Bank of Clinton; the Clinton National Bank (http://www.clintonnational.com/), and of the Clinton Gas Light & Coke Co. and Clinton Water Works Co.

== Non business interests ==
He was an ardent Republican in politics, but never sought nor held office, never seeking to unduly influence the opinions of his employees upon political matters recognizing the duty of all men to exercise an intelligent and unbiased franchise according to individual and conscientious judgement. While never a member of any religious body, his life was moulded upon the highest plane and with decided opinions upon religious subjects, he was a liberal giver to all worthy church and other work calculated to raise the standard of morality, and ameliorate the condition of his fellow men.

== Family life ==
Lamb was married November 16, 1839, to Miss Jane Bevier of Bradford, New York, whose father David Bevier served as adjutant of the Third Ulster County, New York, regiment in the revolutionary war. The Lambs were married for fifty-eight years, during which time two sons, Artemus and Lafayette, and four daughters, Augusta, Celesta, Merrette and Emma E., were born to them. Celesta and Merrette died as children. Mrs. Lamb died on March 5, 1897. Mr. Lamb died four months later, on July 12, 1897.
