= F. Trubee Davison =

American WWI pilot, lawyer, and NY legislator (1896–1974)

Trubee Davison
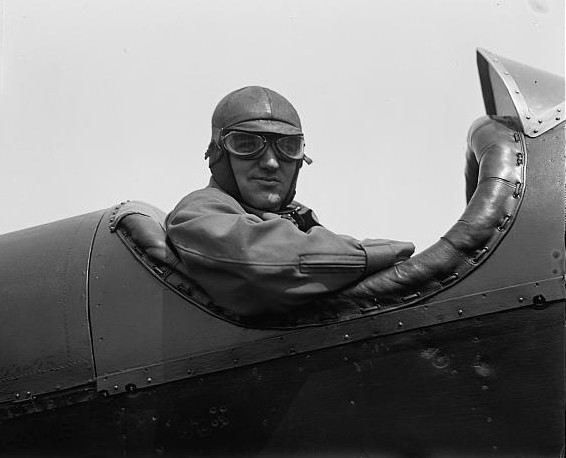
- Davison at Bolling Field in 1926

Assistant Secretary of War for Air
- In office July 2, 1926 – March 4, 1933
- President: Calvin Coolidge; Herbert Hoover
- Preceded by: Position established
- Succeeded by: Robert A. Lovett (1941)

Member of the New York State Assembly from the 2nd district
- In office January 1, 1922 – July 2, 1926
- Preceded by: Theodore Roosevelt Jr.
- Succeeded by: Leonard Hall

Personal details
- Born: Frederick Trubee Davison; February 7, 1896 New York City, New York, U.S.
- Died: November 14, 1974 (aged 78) Locust Valley, New York, U.S.
- Resting place: Locust Valley Cemetery
- Party: Republican
- Relatives: Henry Davison (father); Artemus Gates (brother-in-law)
- Education: Yale University (BA); Columbia University (LLB)

Frederick Trubee Davison (February 7, 1896 – November 14, 1974) was an American World War I aviator, attorney, New York legislator, assistant United States Secretary of War, director of personnel for the Central Intelligence Agency, and president of the American Museum of Natural History.

== Biography ==
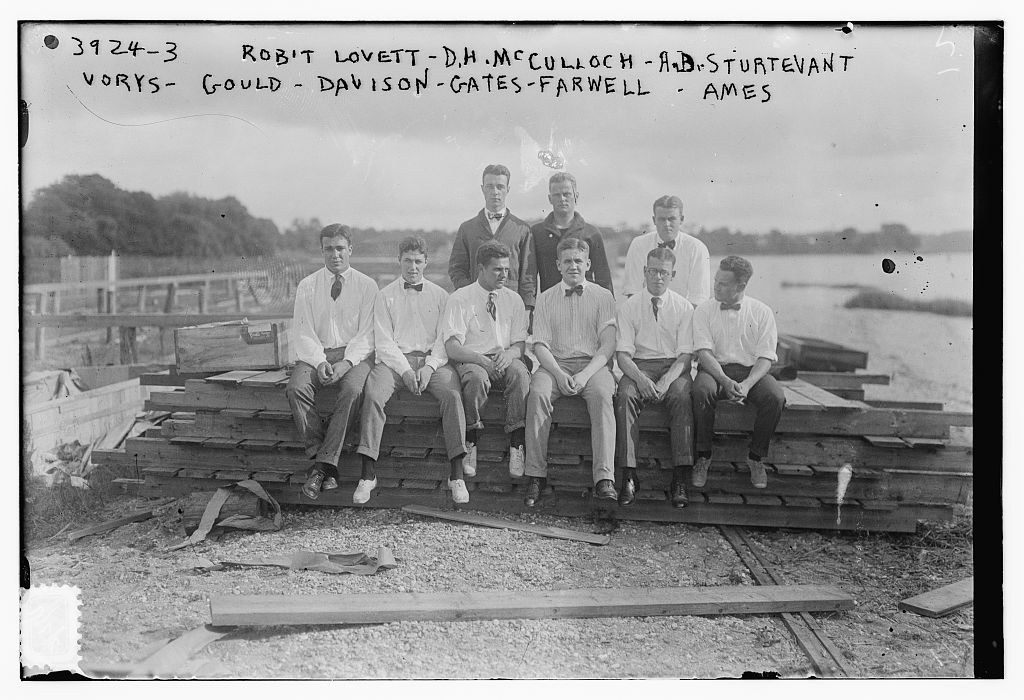
Robert Abercrombie Lovett (1895-1986), David Hugh McCulloch (1890-1955), Albert Dillon Sturtevant (1894-1918), John Martin Vorys (1896-1968), Rear Admiral Erl Clinton Barker Gould (1895-1968), Davison, Artemus Lamb Gates (1895–1976), John Villiers Farwell III (1895-1992), and Allan Wallace Ames (1893-1966) in July 1916 at Port Washington, New York.

He was born on February 7, 1896, to Henry Pomeroy Davison. He graduated from Groton School and then attended Yale University as part of the class of 1918.

He was a member of Yale's secret Skull and Bones society.

=== War years ===
Davison was the founder of the First Yale Unit, which is considered to be the first naval air reserve unit. He founded the unit in 1916 in response to the war that was raging in Europe. Davison and a handful of other students from Yale feared that the United States would soon be dragged into the war effort and would find itself poorly prepared, especially in aviation. Davison told his mother that the government was "asleep at the switch". After consulting with John Hays Hammond Jr. and Henry Woodhouse, Davison decided to pull together a group of twelve from amongst Yale's undergraduates to form a unit of flyboys that would possibly operate along the Atlantic Coast. Hammond and Admiral Peary of the American navy had worked out plans to develop a type of coast guard along the eastern shores that would operate from the air. They wanted to set up a series of seaplane stations which would each have a specific piece of territory to patrol. Davison took to this idea immediately and formed the unit. In the First Yale Unit with him were Robert A. Lovett, John Vorys, John Villiers Farwell III, Albert Ditman, Wellesley Laud Brown, Artemus L. Gates, Erl Clinton Barker Gould, Allan Wallace Ames, C. D. Wiman, Albert Dillon Sturtevant, and H. P. Davison Jr. Davison and his friends began their aviation training privately with the help of pilot David Hugh McCulloch in the summer of 1916 while staying at the Davison's house at Peacock Point. in Locust Valley on Long Island.

Davison also relied on the financial aid provided by his father, Henry P. Davison, and his friends in the form of flying boats and equipment for the unit. Over the next year, Trubee Davison would fight tirelessly to have the unit officially recognized by the U.S. Navy making trips to Washington to speak to the Secretary of the Navy, Josephus Daniels. Turned down again and again, Davison didn't lose hope but instead became more persistent in his efforts to have the unit trained under military conditions and to have all of the members earn their navy wings so that they would be prepared to serve America at a moment's notice. A short while after returning to the Yale campus, Davison learned that Lieutenant John H. Towers, a legendary pilot and the third ever to earn navy wings, was in New York. Davison went to speak with him and Towers was sympathetic to their cause and asked him to write a letter to Daniels telling him about their meeting. When he didn't hear a response, Davison again contacted Towers and then went to Washington to meet with him. It was during this meeting that he gained the approval of the U.S. Navy to have the unit become part of the Naval Reserve and train in Palm Beach. Within five days Davison was off to Palm Beach along with the rest of the First Yale Unit to continue training as naval pilots.

On July 28, 1917, Davison was set to take his flying test in order to obtain his navy wings. Having fainted only a short while before the test, Davison was not sure about whether or not he should fly but decided he felt well enough. During the flight, he lost control of his seaplane in a panic attack and spiralled into the sea, the impact of which split the plane in two. Davison was admitted to St. Luke's hospital where he was diagnosed with a broken back and injured spinal cord. He would spend six weeks there. Davison never saw combat but was active in unit activities throughout the war and was awarded the Navy Cross for his services.

=== After the war ===
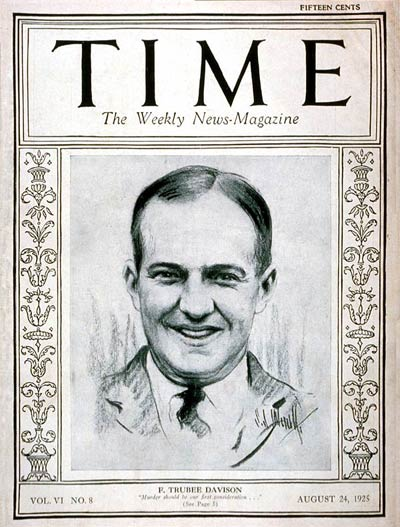
Time cover, August 24, 1925

After the war, Davison went back to Yale and, while rooming with fellow unit member "Di" (Artemus) Gates, finished his undergraduate program graduating in 1919. In 1920, he married Dorothy Peabody, the daughter of the headmaster at Groton School where he had attended before attending Yale. After his father died Trubee and Dorothy built a house on the Davison estate, Peacock Point, in order to keep his mother company.

Davison proceeded to attend Columbia University Law School where he earned a Law Degree and then went on to work with White and Case, Manhattan lawyers.

Every year, Davison held a reunion for the First Yale Unit in New York City in the summer and sometimes other naval aviators would attend as well original members.

He was on the cover of Time magazine for August 24, 1925.

In 1951, he became a trustee of Yale and the first personnel director of the newly formed CIA.

=== Political life ===
Davison was elected to the New York State Legislature after the war where he gained a reputation as being one of the hardest-working members. In 1925, he became head of the unofficial "Crime Commission", sponsored by Judge Elbert H. Gary.

He was a member of the New York State Assembly (Nassau Co., 2nd D.) in 1922, 1923, 1924, 1925 and 1926. He was Assistant Secretary of War for Air from July 1926 to March 1933. In the New York state election, 1932, he ran for Lieutenant Governor of New York with William J. Donovan, but they were defeated in a landslide by Democrats Herbert H. Lehman and M. William Bray. Davison was an alternate delegate to the 1940 Republican National Convention.

He died on November 14, 1974, in Locust Valley, New York.

== See also ==
- List of Skull and Bones members

Political offices
New office	Assistant Secretary of War for Air; 1926–1933	Vacant Title next held by Robert A. Lovett; 1941
Party political offices
Preceded by Caleb H. Baumes	Republican nominee for Lieutenant Governor of New York; 1932	Succeeded by Fred J. Douglas
