= Holden C. Richardson =

United States Navy officer

Holden Chester Richardson
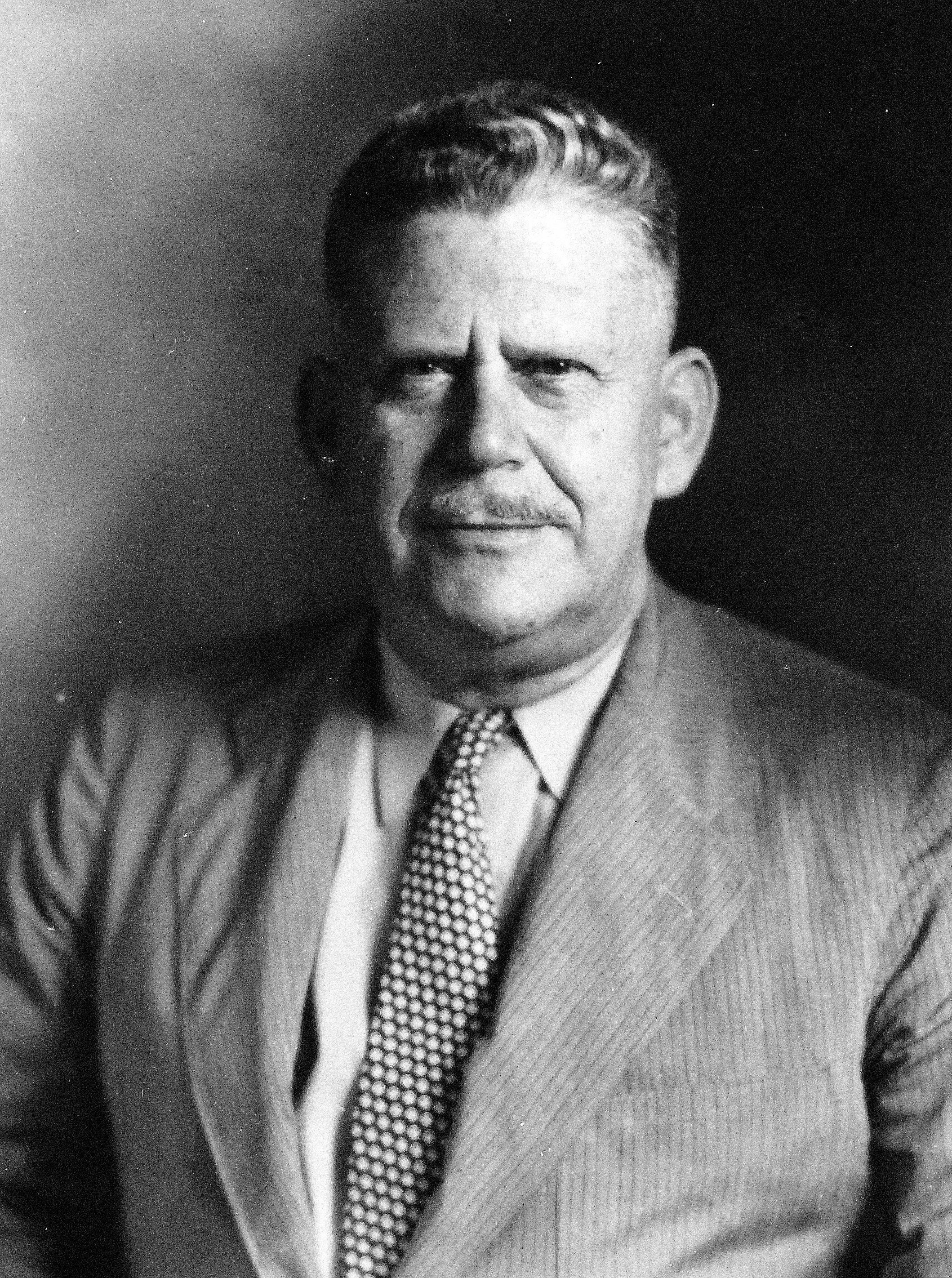
- Holden C. Richardson, 1938
- Born: December 7, 1878; Shamokin, Pennsylvania, US
- Died: September 2, 1960 (aged 81); Bethesda, Maryland, US
- Burial place: Arlington National Cemetery
- Military career
- Allegiance: United States of America
- Branch: United States Navy
- Service years: 1901-1929, 1934-46
- Rank: Captain
- Conflicts: World War I World War II
- Awards: Navy Cross

Holden Chester Richardson (December 7, 1878 – September 2, 1960) was a decorated officer in the United States Navy with the rank of captain. He is most noted as a pioneer in United States naval aviation.

== Biography ==
He was born on December 7, 1878, in Shamokin, Pennsylvania. Richardson attended the United States Naval Academy, graduating in 1901. Among his classmates were fellow naval engineers Julius A. Furer and George C. Westervelt and future Chief of Naval Operations Ernest J. King.

Richardson learned to fly from Glenn Curtiss in 1913, and he was designated Naval Aviator number 13. He was the Navy's first engineering test pilot and helped develop the first Navy-built seaplane, pontoons and hulls that overcame water suction, and a catapult to launch aircraft.

As a member of the Navy Construction Corps, Richardson helped to design the hull of the Curtiss NC flying boats. On October 4, 1918, he performed the crucial test flight of NC-1, the first of these seaplanes, from Jamaica Bay. He then took the plane, with a full crew, for a shakedown flight to the Washington Navy Yard for inspection by Navy leadership. Four days later, the Armistice ended World War I, and the military's need for flying boats abruptly ended.

After the war, the Navy decided to pursue a transatlantic flight by a division of four Curtiss NC flying boats. Because of his involvement in their design and development, Richardson was chosen to be one of the two pilots of NC-3, the division flagship. Only three planes were operational when they left Naval Air Station Rockaway on May 8, 1919. The overnight transatlantic crossing from Trepassey, Newfoundland to the Azores was attempted on May 16–17. NC-3 was forced to set down 200 nautical miles short of the Azores and Richardson had to taxi the remaining way until taken in tow by a Navy ship. NC-1 also had to set down short of the Azores, so only NC-4 was able to reach the European mainland at Lisbon, Portugal by air on May 27. Because of his contribution to this project, Richardson was awarded the Navy Cross. He was also made an officer of the Order of the Tower and Sword by the Portuguese government on June 3, 1919.

While Chief Engineer of the Naval Aircraft Factory, Richardson developed a rotatable catapult enabling aircraft to operate from capital ships. In 1925 he led efforts to develop carrier aircraft and patrol planes. He was the first secretary of the National Advisory Committee for Aeronautics.

He died on September 2, 1960, in Bethesda, Maryland, and was buried at Arlington National Cemetery.

== Legacy ==
Richardson was enshrined in the National Aviation Hall of Fame in 1978 and in the Naval Aviation Hall of Honor in 1981. Richardson Field near Shamokin, Pennsylvania, was named in his honor.
