= Lewis Thompson Preston =

American banker (1926–1995)

Lewis Preston

President of the World Bank Group
- In office September 1, 1991 – May 4, 1995; On leave: February 1, 1995 – May 4, 1995
- Preceded by: Barber Conable
- Succeeded by: Ernest Stern (acting)

Personal details
- Born: Lewis Thompson Preston; August 5, 1926 New York City, New York, U.S.
- Died: May 4, 1995 (aged 68) Washington, D.C., U.S.
- Resting place: Locust Valley Cemetery
- Spouse: Patsy Pulitzer (m. 1959)
- Education: Harvard University (BA)

Lewis Thompson Preston (August 5, 1926 – May 4, 1995) was an American banker. He was President of the World Bank from September 1991 until his death in May 1995.

== Life and career ==
Born New York City, Preston was the son of Lewis T. and Priscilla Baldwin Preston. His father was a World War I flier and a well-known hunter. His grandfather was a partner in Standard Oil. Part of his youth was spent living in Paris. He served in the US Marines during World War II in the Pacific and as an aide to Navy Secretary James Forrestal who was a friend of his mother. He graduated from Harvard University with a degree in history in 1951, and was at one point during his education the captain of Harvard's hockey team. He was chosen for the United States men's national ice hockey team, but never ended up competing in the Olympics.

Preston worked at J.P. Morgan & Co. and its subsidiary Morgan Guaranty Trust Company for forty years. His first major contribution to the company was in the mid-1960s when he convinced the company to use trade in the newly formed Eurodollar market as source of liquidity; a move which greatly improved the prosperity of the company. In 1968 he was appointed vice president in charge of international banking, and under his tenure over half of the company's earnings came from the international banking sector in the 1970s. After eight years in that position he became vice chairman of the board of directors in 1976, and then president of the board in 1978.

In 1980 Preston was appointed CEO of J.P. Morgan & Co. He helped the company weather the storm of Silver Thursday in 1980 which had a wide negative impact on the banking industry. In 1984 he assisted in the bailout of Continental Illinois when it was seized by the Federal Deposit Insurance Corporation. He retired as CEO in February 1991. From September 1991 until his death in Washington D.C. on May 4, 1995, he was President of the World Bank.

== Personal life ==
He was the second husband of Patsy Pulitzer.

Business positions
Preceded by Walter Page	Chairman of J.P. Morgan & Co. 1980–1991	Succeeded by Dennis Weatherstone
Diplomatic posts
Preceded by Barber Conable	President of the World Bank Group; 1991–1995	Succeeded by Ernest Stern; Acting
