= Naval Reserve Flying Corps =

The Naval Reserve Flying Corps (NRFC) was the first United States Navy reserve pilot procurement program. As part of demobilization following World War I the NRFC was completely inactive by 1922; but it is remembered as the origin of the naval aviation component of the United States Navy Reserve, the Naval Air Reserve.

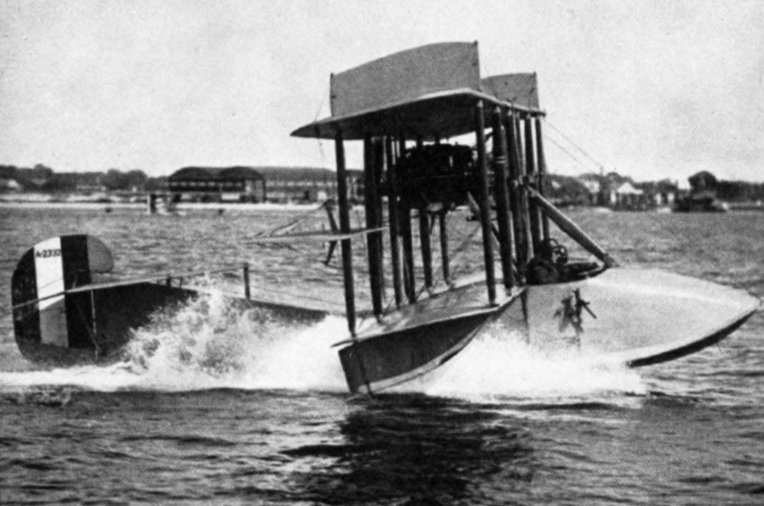
Many Naval Reserve Flying Corps pilots trained in this Curtiss Model F seaplane.

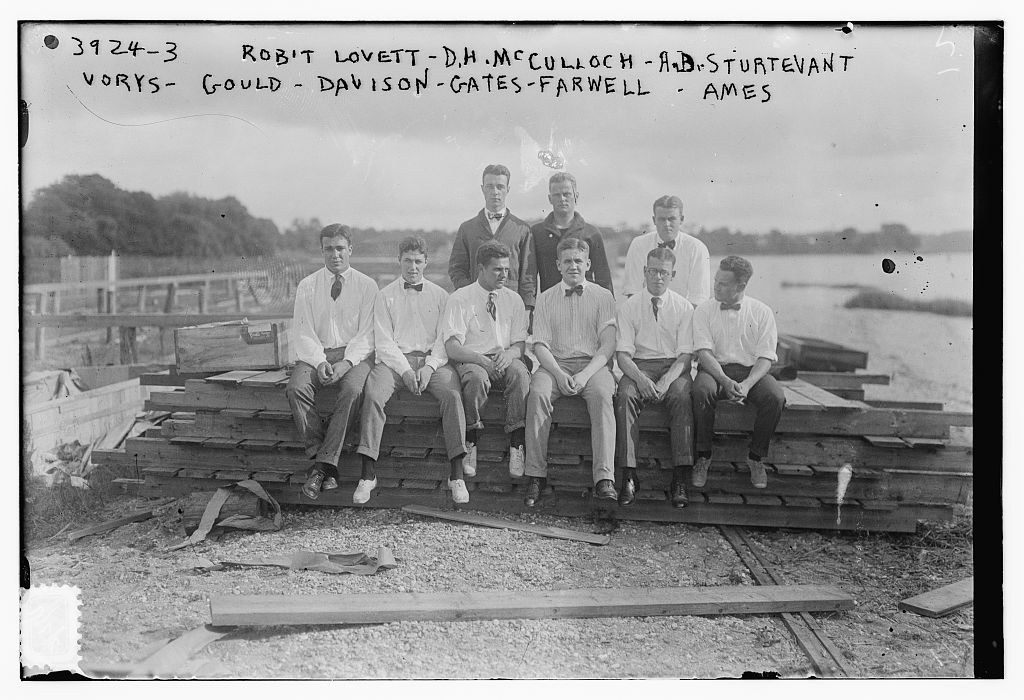
Robert Abercrombie Lovett (1895-1986), David Hugh McCulloch (1890-1955), Albert Dillon Sturtevant (1894-1918), John Martin Vorys (1896-1968), Rear Admiral Earl Clinton Barker Gould (1895-1968), Frederick Trubee Davison (1896-1974), Artemus Lamb Gates (1895–1976), John Villiers Farwell III (1895-1992), and Allan Wallace Ames (1893-1966) in July 1916 at Port Washington, New York.

== Background ==
United States naval aviation inventory was six airplanes at the beginning of World War I. Four operated from Naval Air Station Pensacola and two were assigned to USS North Carolina. The Navy organized an unfunded naval militia in 1915 encouraging formation of ten state-run militia units of aviation enthusiasts. The Naval Appropriations Act of 29 August 1916 included funds for both a Naval Flying Corps (NFC) and a Naval Reserve Flying Corps. Students at several Ivy League colleges organized flying units and began pilot training at their own expense. The NFC mustered 42 Navy officers, 6 United States Marine Corps officers, and 239 enlisted men when the United States declared war on 6 April 1917. These men recruited and organized qualified members from the various state naval militia and college flying units into the NRFC.

== Wartime ==
A three-part pilot training program was implemented beginning with two months of ground school, followed by preliminary flight training teaching student pilots to fly solo, and advanced flight training to qualification as a naval aviator with a commission in the Naval Reserve Flying Corps. The first ground school for pilot training was at the Massachusetts Institute of Technology. The first class of fifty student pilots arrived on 23 July 1917 for an eight-week program covering electricity, signals, photography, seamanship, navigation, gunnery, aeronautic engines, theory of flight, and aircraft instruments. Later classes received an initial period of indoctrination and preliminary training aboard a receiving ship before assignment to ground school. Those who successfully completed ground school were transferred to naval air stations for flight training. In July 1918 parallel ground school programs began at the University of Washington in Seattle and at Dunwoody Institute in Minneapolis; but few graduates of these schools could be counted among the 18,000 naval aviation personnel who reached Europe before the war ended.

United States naval aviation manpower had climbed to 37,407 when the First Armistice at Compiègne ended hostilities on 11 November 1918. Reservists accounted for 82 percent of this number. There were 6,716 officers and 30,693 enlisted men in Navy units, and 282 officers and 2,180 men in Marine Corps units. The number of qualified pilots was approximately 1,600. Awarding of naval aviator precedence list numbers in the sequence of pilot qualification did not begin until January 1918; and some duplicate or fractional numbers were awarded in subsequent attempts to appropriately place pilots qualified before that date.

Several NRFC pilots achieved significant recognition. Charles Hammann was the only Navy pilot to be awarded the Medal of Honor during World War I. Stephen Potter of the second Yale University flying unit was the first Navy pilot credited with destruction of an enemy aircraft in aerial combat; and David Sinton Ingalls of the First Yale Unit was the only Navy flying ace of World War I. James Forrestal of the Princeton University flying unit was designated Naval Aviator number 154 and later became the first United States Secretary of Defense. Other members of the Yale Unit were Naval Aviator # 73 John Martin Vorys and Naval Aviator # 74 Kenneth MacLeish.

== Peacetime ==
Funding was provided in 1920 for fifteen-day training periods at Naval Air Station Rockaway for a limited number of NRFC pilots; but no funding was available in subsequent years. Without the opportunity to continue flying, many pilots failed to re-enroll upon completion of their four-year obligation. Those who did were transferred from the NRFC to the Volunteer Naval Reserve Force. A few reserve pilots were able to fly periodically from Naval Air Station Rockaway, Naval Air Station Anacostia and Naval Air Station Squantum.
