= New Rochelle Art Association =

The New Rochelle Art Association (NRAA) was founded in 1912 by artists and residents of the city of New Rochelle in Westchester County, New York. By 1912 the community had transformed into a true artists colony, home to many notable artists of the time including Frederic Remington, Alta West Salisbury, Edward Kemble, Rufus Fairchild Zogbaurn, Orson Lowell, F. Wellingon Ruckstuhl, Ernest Albert, Homer Emons, Frederick Dana Marsh, Remington Schuyler, Lucius Wolcott Hitchcock, George T. Tobin, Leon Shafer, Charles Ayer, Herman Lambden and Armand Both.

== Founding ==
For years there had been informal meetings in the studios of various artists, often with guests invited out from New York City. In 1912, however, Alta Salisbury West proposed that a more formal group be formed – the New Rochelle Art Association. The original group of artists included Charles F. Ayer, Frederick Dana Marsh, Remington Schuyler, Herman Lambden, George T. Tobin, Armand Booth, Leon Schafer, Lucius Hitchcock and Orson Lowell. Mrs. West became the first president. The Art Association produced its first public exhibition in 1914 as part of the celebrations surrounding the opening of the new Carnegie Public Library on Main Street which included both a large and small public exhibition room. This exhibition, organized under the auspices of the Art Section of the Woman's Club of New Rochelle, was the first exhibition of the New Rochelle Art Association. There were 140 juried entries of paintings and sculpture, including a painting by Frederic Remington and an outstanding bronze bust of Augustus Thomas by Robert Aitken.

The exhibiting artists included:

- Lydia Field Emmet (1866–1952)
- Frederick Dana Marsh (1872–1961)
- Norman Rockwell (1894–1978)
- Edward Kemble (1861–1933)
- Charles M. Relyea (1863–1932)
- Orson Lowell (1871–1956)
- J. C. Leyendecker (1874–1951)
- F. X. Leyendecker (1876–1924)
- Edward Penfield (1866–1925)
- Otto Cushing (1870–1942)
- C. Coles Phillips (1880–1927)
- Ernest Albert (1857–1946)
- Remington Schuyler (1884–1955)
- Montague Castle
- Frank P. Fairbanks (1875–1939)
- Charles H. Wright (1918–2002)
- Alta West Salisbury (1879–1933)
- Herman Lambden (1859–1935)
- Frederic Remington (1861–1909)
- Alice J. Crosby
- George F. Kerr (1870–1953)
- J. D. Woodward (1846–1924)
- F. Edwin Church (1876–1975)
- Louis R. Metcalfe (1874–1946)
- Augusta N. Ayers
- A. Phimster Proctor (1860–1950)
- N. J. Burchell
- Alonzo Klaw (1885–?)
- Elizabeth Anderson
- H. H. Stanton (?–1937)
- G. Glenn Newell (1870–1947)
- Alice Randall Marsh (1869–1929)
- Robert I. Aitken (1878–1949)

That exhibition was just the first of many at the library. The members of the Art Association continued to use the library to show their work. There were both group shows, generally featuring a particular media, and ones featuring various individual artists. Shows in the first few years included one devoted to the work of Frederick Dana Marsh and one to Milton Mayer, and a group show of the Association of Women Painters and Sculptors of New York City.

== Organization ==
On January 4, 1920, a notice appeared on the bottom of New Rochelle's Evening Standard advertising the annual meeting of all members of the NRAA at the home of Orson Lowell. This was the meeting where the Art Association was formally organized and its aims set forth. Its stated plan was to cooperate with the Community Service which was promoting education, literacy and civic betterment programs in New Rochelle. By holding regular exhibitions of the highest quality, the association planned to set an educational standard in the fine arts, and in other ways to promote public interest in art in the community. There were three classes of membership: active, associate, and patron. The association was divided into four sections, each with a chairman and secretary, who had representation on the central board composed of the officers.

=== Board ===
- President: Frederick Dana Marsh
- Vice President: Orson Lowell
- Second Vice President: Julius Prince
- Secretary: Elizabeth Ayer
- Treasurer: E. Irvins Hanson

=== Sections of the NRAA ===
- Painter's and Sculptors – Chairman: Alta West Salisbury; Secretary: John W. Fenton
- Architects and Interior Decorators – Chairman: Laulnce L. Barnard; Secretary: Paul M. ReillY
- Illustrators and Cartoonists – Chairman: Remington Schuyler; Secretary: George E. Giguere
- Arts and Crafts – Chairman: Miss Mary G. Griggs; Secretary: none chosen

There were no known written by-laws of the association until 1929, when, under the laws of the State of New York, the New Rochelle Art Association was required to develop its own constitution and by-laws for a membership corporation. In the early 1930s the constitution and by-laws were updated to again meet state requirements, this time for a non-profit membership corporation.

== Exhibitions ==
In 1920, after the association had been organized into its four main sections, the 'Fine Arts Room' of the library was acquired for the group's use. The first exhibition was put on by the 'Illustrators Section' and 57 paintings in every medium were displayed. The following year the exhibit included the Knickerbocker Press and The Little Print Press, both of New Rochelle, and showed the various processes used to make books. The 'Painters Section' soon followed with their own exhibit, followed by the 'Cartoonists'. Next there was the "Little Picture Show" and the "Sketch Exhibit" which both became annual events.

Finally the 'Architects Section' mounted their exhibition. It wasn't until this show that brought together the work of a number of city architects that the community finally realized how many talented artists and masters of their profession actually resided in New Rochelle. Three medals were awarded at the exhibit including; Best Designed Residence – Phillip J. Rocker; Best Designed Commercial Building – Laurence M. Loeb; and the Best Rendering – George Licht.

The variety of shows was amazing. Kenneth Clark exhibited a number of his photographs and Henry Bultitude exhibited his miniature rooms creations. The graphic arts fueled continued interest, and drawings, illustrations, posters, wood and linoleum cuts, etchings, monotypes' and lithographic prints were shown.

During the 1920s the New Rochelle Art Association continued to exhibit regularly. There were so many members that each show tended to be devoted to subsets of the membership. There were shows for illustrations, for painting and sculpture, for drawings and graphic arts, architecture and one devoted to arts and crafts. In between the group shows, smaller shows were held featuring a particular artist, or a particular medium. Many shows also featured a lecture related to the theme of the show. The organization often operated as a museum for the city. A show in November 1921, for example, featured paintings and sculptures loaned by local patrons. It was considered significant enough that The New York Times covered the show saying, "About $50,000 has emerged from the private collections of the locality". The show included four examples of work by Winslow Homer.

In 1925 the association organized a poster exhibition which included posters that had been part of a lawsuit in England. These were a series of posters featuring scenes from the British colonies done by Captain Spenser Pryse for the British Empire Exhibition, but had been rejected because some of the subjects were too scantily clad.

In 1925, the association lost one of their notable illustrators – Edward Penfield. A memorial exhibition was held in his honor. He was considered the "originator of the poster in America" and for six years designed all the posters for Harper's Magazine. Many examples of his work were displayed.

While, for the most part, the work that appeared in the shows seems to have been somewhat conservative in style, the members of the association were aware of current movements. They went out of their way to look for examples of work from overseas, and shows might include work by artists from London or Munich or Scandinavia. A 1926 show included work by Reginald Marsh. In 1927 they even hosted a show billed as a “Modern Show”. The following year they had a special section of the display area where they put “the more modern trend of paintings.” A 1928 show garnered a full page spread in the local paper with photos of many of the artists and their art. This show was also covered in The New York Times and was so popular that special trains ran out from New York City so that students could attend the show. Exhibitors included some of the stars of the illustration world including Ernest Watson, Federick R. Gruger, Franklin Booth and Percy Crosby, as well as Frederick Dana Marsh, Courtney Allen, George T. Tobin, Donald Teague, Leslie Zauner, J. C. Leyendecker, Dean Cornwall, Water B. Humphrey, Orson Lowell, Norman Rockwell, Revere Wistehuff, George Brehm, Charles Williams, Robert W. Stewart, C. J. Munro and Harold Anderson.

In the early 1950s, the First National Bank of New Rochelle opened its doors to the NRAA to exhibit paintings and sculpture. Fifteen years later the same bank, but under the name of the First Westchester National Bank, allowed the association to use its facilities for a juried Sculpture and Ceramics Forms Exhibition. This type of show was the first of its kind.

In 1963, all the first-place winners from a year's worth of shows displayed their work together at the Ruth White gallery on 57th Street in New York City to generally favorable reviews.

The saddest exhibitions were the memorial tributes which were mounted shortly after a member's death. These were started in 1924 upon the passing of Frank X. Leyendecker. His memorial exhibition drew large crowds from the fields of art, opera, publishing and stage. Six more memorials were held, from 1924 to 1934, for Clare Briggs, Edward Penfield, Coles Phillips, C.J. Munro, and Kenneth Clark.

== Approach signs ==
In 1921, the New Rochelle Art Association (NRAA), the New Rochelle Chamber of Commerce and New Rochelle Mayor Harry Scott, wanted to move away from billboards and design welcome signs that were different. These signs would serve for the major approaches on roads entering New Rochelle. In April of that year a model of one of the signs was displayed at the New Rochelle Trust company and in 1922 the City Council approved their construction. James Marsh, a member of the Art Association and a metal craftsman, wrought the signs by hand his studio from the designs and were given as a gift to the City from the NRAA. Ten of the twelve signs were completed in 1923 and were mounted on the cement stanchions at the main approach roads into the City. Each of the signs had a cutout design on the top and, hanging below on brackets, a separate sign made of iron that carried out the artist's motif with an inscription.

The signs include:

- "La Rochelle" – James Marsh – the younger Marsh's depiction, doesn't show New Rochelle, but the harbor of its mother city La Rochelle and the gate that surrounds it. Located near 1401 Wilmot Rd. Marsh was also responsible for the steel work on all of the signs.
- "The Huguenot Ship" – Frederick Dana Marsh (father of James Marsh) – states that the City of the Huguenots was founded in 1688 Located near 135 Pelham Shore Rd
- "Landing of the Huguenots" – George T. Tobin – similar to the idea of Frederick Dana Marsh, Tobin captured the early days of New Rochelle's history by depicting the landing of the Huguenots Located near 1185 Webster Avenue
- "Rich In History" – Norman Rockwell – located near 791 Pelhamdale Avenue
- "Passing Of The British" – Coles Phillips depicts the General Howe and his Hessian soldiers on the way through New Rochelle, via North Avenue, on their way to White Plains. – Located near 1530 North Avenue
- "Stage Coach Days" (17 Miles to New York) – Edward Penfield – depiction of Colonial times in New Rochelle and is appropriately located opposite 989 Boston Post Road
- "When A Feller Needs A Friend" – Clare Briggs – located near 174 Kings Highway
- "Indians Returning From The Deer Hunt" – Remington Schuyler – another sign where the location is appropriately place. Schuyler's piece depicts the Siwanoy returning with a kill of deer. The location is the intersection where the Siwanoy crossed the old trail with Boston Post road. Located near 1 East Main Street
- "The Home Town" – Ralph T. Robertson – located near 373 Lincoln Avenue
- "City Of Homes, Churches, and Schools" – Laurence M. Loeb. The lettering on this last sign was changed later to read "City Of Homes, Houses of Worship and Schools". Located on the corner of Quaker Ridge Road and Weaver Street

Walter Beach Humphrey and Lucius Hitchcock were other designers that contributed to this project. The signs caused a major sensation and were given national press coverage, and were copied in other communities across the country.

== Art schools ==
According to Lucius Hitchcock, President of the NRAA in 1924, New Rochelle was not only the most affluent city in New York State, but had more artists per capita than almost any city in the U.S. To capitalize on both of these, the Art Association felt the time had come to sponsor an art school here, and would direct its policies and hire its teachers. At the beginning, the proposed New Rochelle Art School would afford opportunities for study to young men and women, although children and classes might also be established, including evening classes. The school was also give what would amount to collegiate work in architecture. The NRAA artists would receive no pay for their work and would do everything in connection with the school except assume financial responsibility. Their hope was to have the City fund this endeavor and they felt the best way to do this was through the Board of Education. According to a letter to the Board of Education, the plan was to charge tuition at New York Art School rates, of about $30 per week, to the students and, in return for the financial support given by the Board of Education, the school would offer free scholarships to public school pupils. The association reserved the right to terminate the scholarship without recourse if the student failed in effort or disclosed what was judged to be a lack of appreciation of his opportunities. After much deliberation, the Board of Education turned them down. They reasoned that using taxpayer's money to maintain a school for the benefit of a few talented pupils was too narrow a focus.

Twenty four years later a group of four NRAA artists established an art school. This time a private school named “The Huguenot School of Art” opened its doors at 352 North Avenue. It was an evening school so as to accommodate those individuals with a major interest in art who had to hold down full-time jobs. Its founders made up the faculty, with each having his area of expertise. The purpose of the school was to provide a carefully selected course of studies to develop sound training in drawing, painting, and creative composition as the foundation for an active career in the field of art. The curriculum consisted of basic, intermediate and advanced courses with Saturday classes for children. These were too progressively arranged so that the student would have the opportunity to explore the possibilities of many graphic media, and to present every constructive trend in the conservative and modern schools of art expression. For four years this school was an important element in the art world of the region.
