= George Tobin (disambiguation) =

George Tobin is an American record producer.

George Tobin may also refer to:

- George Tobin (American football) (1921–1999), American football player
- George Tobin (Royal Navy officer) (1768–1838), British naval officer and artist
- George T. Tobin (1864–1956), American illustrator

== See also ==
- Tobin (surname)
