= Frederick Church =

Frederick Church may refer to:

- Frederic Edwin Church (1826–1900), American landscape painter from Connecticut
- Frederick Stuart Church (1842–1924), American painter from Michigan
- Fred Church (actor) (1889–1983), American actor
- Frederick Church (engineer) (1878–1936), early amusement park pioneer
- Frederic Cameron Church Jr. (1897–1983), American businessman
- F. Edwin Church (1876–1975), American painter and sculptor from New York
