= Knickerbocker Building =

Knickerbocker Building may refer to:

- Knickerbocker Building (New Rochelle, New York), on the National Register of Historic Places
- The Knickerbocker Hotel, Manhattan, formerly called The Knickerbocker Building
- Knickerbocker (Spokane, Washington), a building on the National Register of Historic Places

== See also ==
- Knickerbocker Trust Company, which occupied the Kickerbocker Trust Building in New York City
