= Frank Bailey (financier) =

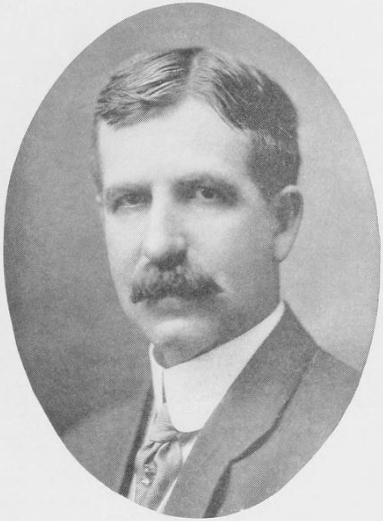
- Born: January 5, 1865; Chatham, New York, US
- Died: August 26, 1953 (aged 88); Locust Valley, New York, US
- Education: Union College
- Occupation: Financier
- Spouse: Marie Louise Eastman

Frank Bailey (January 5, 1865 – August 26, 1953) was a Brooklyn-based financier and philanthropist. He was married to Marie Louise Eastman. They maintained a city residence in Brooklyn, and a country residence in Locust Valley (near Lattingtown on Long Island), which they purchased in 1911 and jokingly named "Munnysunk". The estate became the 42-acre (17 ha) Bailey Arboretum.

== Early life and education ==
Bailey was born in Chatham, New York. His father, Dr. William Cady Bailey, was a medical doctor and amateur naturalist (who had studied botany under Amos Eaton). His mother was a school-teacher and homemaker, 20 years younger than his father, a relative of Elizabeth Cady Stanton, and a graduate of Mt. Holyoke College. His parents' house was a station on the Underground Railroad for escaped slaves.

After going to a local school, then Spencertown Academy, Frank Bailey attended and graduated from Union College in Schenectady in 1885 on a scholarship after Williams College turned him down for lack of finances. He served as the Union College treasurer for 51 years, and the college's Frank Bailey Field is named after him.

== Career ==
His career began as a clerk at the Title Guarantee and Trust Company. By 1891 he became vice president of its Brooklyn office, and later became company president until 1924.

Bailey was active in public service. He was a founder and trustee of the Museum of the City of New York, a trustee of the Brooklyn Institute of Arts and Sciences, and chairman of the famous Brooklyn Botanic Garden. In 1929, the Baileys gave $125,000 (equivalent to $2,289,002 in 2024) for the construction of the Bailey Fountain in Brooklyn's Grand Army Plaza, selected on a design competition.

His autobiography, It Can't Happen Here Again: The Life Story of a Self-Made Man, was published in 1945 by Alfred A. Knopf (ASIN B0007E41VS).

Frank Bailey died at Munnysunk on August 26, 1953.

In honor of his humane philosophy of life and nature, his great granddaughter and great great granddaughter have established an equestrian breeding and showing farm, and named it Muny Sunk Stables, Inc.
