= F. Edwin Church =

American painter

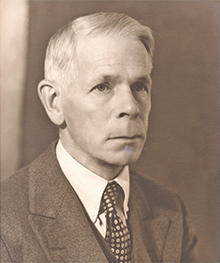
- Born: Frederic Edwin Church; October 25, 1876; Brooklyn, NY
- Died: July 15, 1975 (aged 98); Locust Valley, New York
- Education: Art Students League of New York, Académie Julian, and Columbia University
- Notable work: The Peacock Girl
- Style: Portraits with Japanese influence
- Spouse: Alice Slocum Nichols
- Awards: Thomas B. Clarke Prize by the National Academy of Design for best figural composition for his painting, The Peacock Girl, 1916
- Elected: Allied Artists of America, American Museum of Natural History, Architectural League of New York, Audubon Artists, Lyme Art Association, National Audubon Society, New York Zoological Society, and Salmagundi Club
- Website: https://fedwinchurch.com

F. Edwin Church (October 25, 1876 – July 15, 1975) was an American painter best remembered for his portraits with Japanese influence. Church's oeuvre also encompassed impressionist landscapes, undersea paintings, floral still life, and sculpture.

Church was named after Frederic Edwin Church (1826 – 1900), the Hudson River School artist, by his father E. Dwight Church (1836 – 1908). His father knew the artist but they were not related. To avoid confusion with the prominent artist, Church signed most of his paintings F. Edwin Church.

== Background ==
Born in Brooklyn, New York, Church was the youngest of four sons. He grew up in the Greenpoint Historic District next to the East River. On a summer visit to Middletown, Connecticut, he met his future wife Alice Slocum Nichols, great-granddaughter of Major Abrahm Caleb Truax, founder of Trenton, MI. Following their 1901 marriage in Detroit, they lived in New Rochelle.

Church's grandfather, Austin Church (1799 – 1879), was a co-founder of Church & Dwight, the manufacturer of Arm & Hammer products. Church's three brothers, Elihu Dwight, Jr., Austin, and Charles all worked for the company.

Church's father, E. Dwight Church (1836 – 1908), studied drawing at the National Academy of Design in New York City, and during the 1850s, taught drawing in the public schools. By the late 1870s he began collecting rare and valuable books of early Americana and English literature. In 1911, Henry E. Huntington purchased his collection which became the foundation for the American collections at the Huntington Library.

== Education and Influences ==
A series of his watercolor botanical studies show the influence of Paul de Longpré whose work Church admired. He studied architecture at Columbia University in New York in 1897. Finding that architecture didn't suit him, he enrolled in classes at the Art Students League of New York. His class instructors included Kenyon Cox, Frank Dumond, and John Henry Twachtman.

Church attended the Académie Julian in 1905 and studied under Jean-Paul Laurens. In 1906, a portrait of his wife, noted in the catalogue as Madame C. was accepted to the Salon (Paris). While studying in Paris, Church developed a passion for Japanese print collecting. He assembled a comprehensive reference library and a portfolio of fine, rare, and important Japanese woodblock prints. Like his father, E. Dwight Church, he joined the Grolier Club in New York City and developed lifelong friendships with two avid print collectors, Howard Mansfield and Louis V. Ledoux.

The reference library on Japanese print collecting was sold at Walpole Galleries in New York in 1922. Church's Locust Valley, Long Island house, designed in 1928 by Harrie T. Lindeberg, was paid in part by the sales of a portion of his print collection. The first sale in 1929 was a group of Hiroshige bird and flower prints, sold to Abby Aldrich Rockefeller, who later gifted them to the Rhode Island School of Design. Encouraged by Mansfield, another sale was made to the Metropolitan Museum of Art. Later, in 1946, Parke-Bernet Galleries (now Sotheby's) handled the auction of another large group of prints. As the authority, Church was asked to write the sale catalogue, which was edited by Ledoux.

== Memberships ==
By 1909 he was a member of the Salmagundi Club Salmagundi Club. Memberships in the Lyme Art Association, Allied Artists of America, and the Architectural League of New York followed in the next few years. When he was in his seventies, he joined Audubon Artists. Church also held life memberships in the National Audubon Society, the New York Zoological Society, and the American Museum of Natural History.

An active member of the art community, Church was present during the formation of Allied Artists of America in 1914. His lifelong friend, Charles Bittinger, a board member, nominated Church for membership in the first induction of eleven members. Also included in this group were Church's friends Harry L. Hoffman and Everett Warner.

== Awards ==
In 1916, at the age of 38, Church was awarded the Thomas B. Clarke Prize by the National Academy of Design for best figural composition for his painting, The Peacock Girl. Reflecting his interest in Japanese prints, he created a colorful composition of a red-haired girl in a blue and green floral kimono-inspired dress. Behind her, a peacock is perched with an outstretched wing in a possessive posture. The New York Times (March 26, 1916), Harper's Weekly (April 8, 1916), and Vogue magazine (May 1, 1916) featured the painting in their publication's pictorial sections.

After the award, The Peacock Girl went on a tour of exhibitions starting at the Detroit Museum of Art followed by Toledo Museum of Art, Ohio State University, Art Institute of Chicago, and Pennsylvania Academy of Fine Arts. It was later shown at Lyme Art Association in 1921 and the artist's 1975 Retrospective.

== WWI Contributions ==
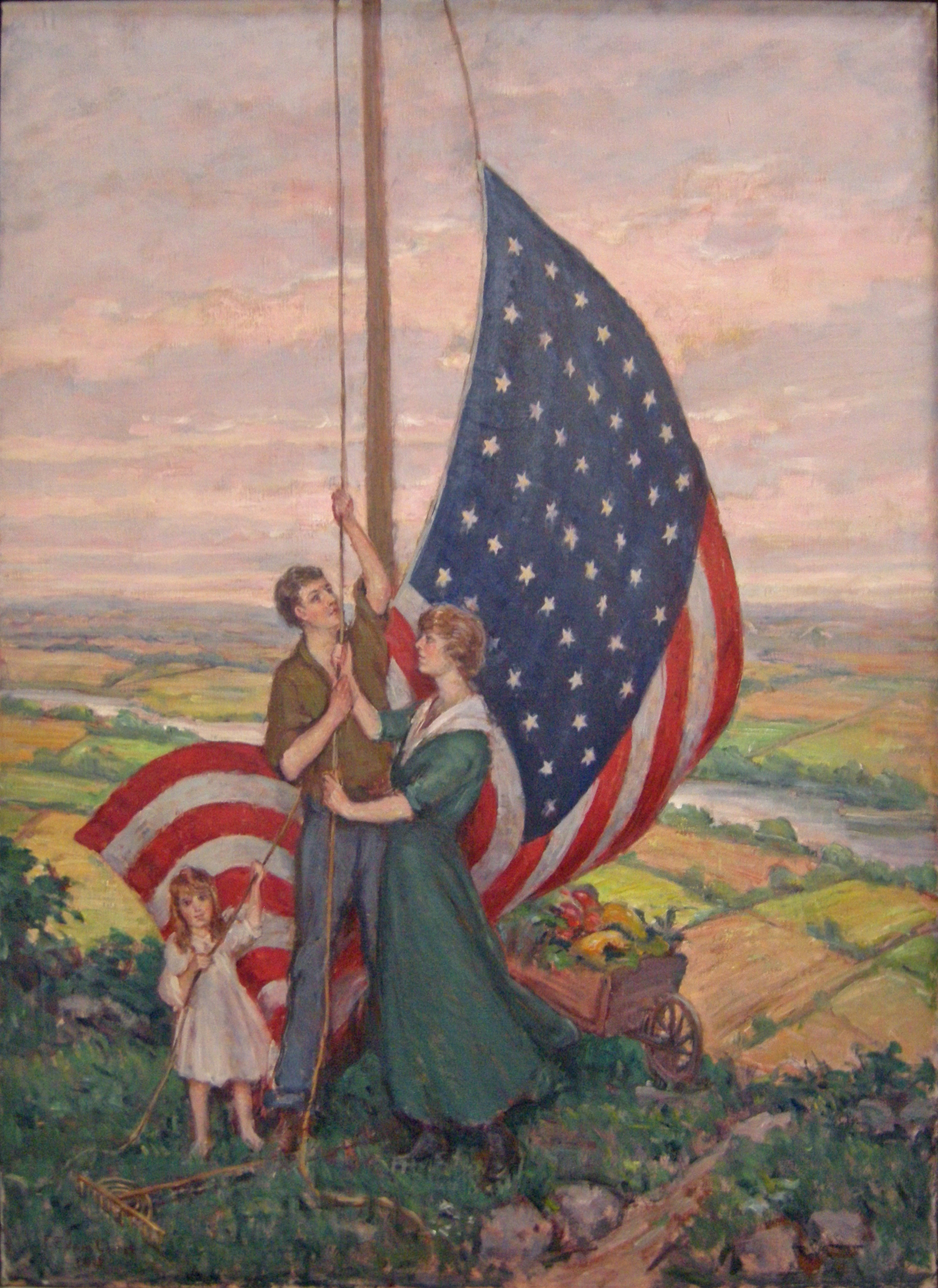
United in Sacrifice, Service & Sharing, We Dedicate the Works of Our Hands During All our Working Hours to Winning Democracy, item no. 62.5.11, Herbert Hoover Presidential Library and Museum

Church participated in the war effort, enlisting in the New York National Guard. He achieved the rank of Second Lieutenant, Ninth Coast Artillery Corps (CAC). Like many artists, he painted camouflage and also had involvement with the United States Food Administration (USFA).

In 1917, President Woodrow Wilson assigned Herbert Hoover as head of the USFA to handle food distribution during World War I (WWI). It was determined that libraries across the country would be used to distribute food conservation ideas to the populace. Edith Guerrier, a Boston librarian, was selected to organize the libraries where food posters, pamphlets and associated information would be made available. After Hoover gave his popular speech, “Food Control – A War Measure” in April 1918, he approved her idea of having top United States artists create paintings to illustrate twelve key points. These would tour state fairs throughout the country as part of the government’s war exhibit.

Artists were contacted by Charles Dana Gibson (1876 – 1944), of Gibson Girl fame, President of the Society of Illustrators. He had been assigned to the Division of Pictorial Publicity (DPP), which was spearheading the production of war posters in New York City. Church was one of 55 artists selected at the Salmagundi Club where the DPP met regularly. Five artists were assigned to each principle of the speech. The resulting sixty paintings were completed in less than three months, in time for the first fairs in August. These were divided into five circuits and displayed to an estimated 8 million people that summer.

Fred’s painting, described as “B-12: Man, woman, and child around flag,” was among those exhibited in January 1919 by the Toledo Museum of Art. The paintings were then transported to Stanford University where the Hoover archives were being assembled. In 1962, they were transferred to the Herbert Hoover Presidential Library and Museum.

== Notable Exhibitions ==
Church had three exhibitions of significance, the first being his one-man show in New York City at Montross Gallery in January 1927. The show featured portraits, still lifes, and views of the Saint-Jean-de-Luz region of France.

This was followed in December by a show of his undersea and landscape paintings of Haiti at Ainslie Galleries. Along with two other artists, Helen Damrosch Tee-Van (illustrator) and Vladimir Perfilieff, he had accompanied William Beebe on the 10th Expedition of the New York Zoological Society (now known as the Wildlife Conservation Society.) After closing, the Haitian exhibit then relocated to the American Museum of Natural History in 1928.

The third, a Retrospective, was held in 1975 at the Country Art Gallery in Locust Valley, New York, shortly before his death at the age of 98. It was held to benefit the North Shore Wildlife Sanctuary where he was a founding member and had donated land. The show included portraits of family members, prominent citizens, local landmarks, and the model of his only known sculpture, Great Blue Heron. A bronze casting stands in the sanctuary.

Other public works are: A portrait of Ellsworth Everett Dwight in The Portrait Collection of the New York Genealogical and Biographical Society; Peonies and The Lilypond at Bailey Arboretum; and A Game of Pelota at the National Art Museum of Sport.

== 21st Century Exhibitions ==
September 19 – December 21, 2025, Making a Name for Himself: The Life and Art of F. Edwin Church (1876–1975), Preservation Long Island Exhibition Gallery, Cold Spring Harbor, NY

July 24 – October 19, 2025, Gatsby at 100, The Long Island Museum, Stony Brook, NY

April 26 – August 17, 2025, Revealing F. Edwin Church, American Impressionist, North Shore Historical Museum, Glen Cove, NY

January 18 – June 15, 2025, Deco at 100, Nassau County Museum of Art, Roslyn Harbor, NY

July 20, 2024 – January 5, 2025, Seeing Red: Renoir to Warhol, Nassau County Museum of Art, Roslyn Harbor, NY

November 18, 2023 – March 10, 2024, Our Gilded Age, Nassau County Museum of Art, Roslyn Harbor, NY

== Exhibitions ==
- Architectural League of New York
- Ainslie Galleries
- Allied Artists of America
- American Museum of Natural History
- Art Institute of Chicago
- Art Students League of New York
- Audubon Artists
- Bailey Arboretum
- Corcoran School of the Arts and Design
- Country Art Gallery
- Detroit Museum of Art
- Duxbury Art Association
- Eastern Long Island Hospital, Greenport, NY
- Hoboken Public Library
- Locust Valley Art Show to benefit Operation Democracy
- Lyme Art Association
- MacDowell Clubs
- Montross Gallery
- National Academy of Design
- National Arts Club
- National Art Museum of Sport
- New Rochelle Art Association
- New York Genealogical and Biographical Society (Portrait Collection)
- Northshore Wildlife Sanctuary
- Ohio State University
- Old Orchard Barn
- Paris Salon (1906)
- Pennsylvania Academy of Fine Arts
- Raynham Hall Museum
- Salmagundi Club
- Salons of America
- Society of Independent Artists
- Toledo Museum of Art
