= Orson Lowell =

American artist and illustrator (1871–1956)

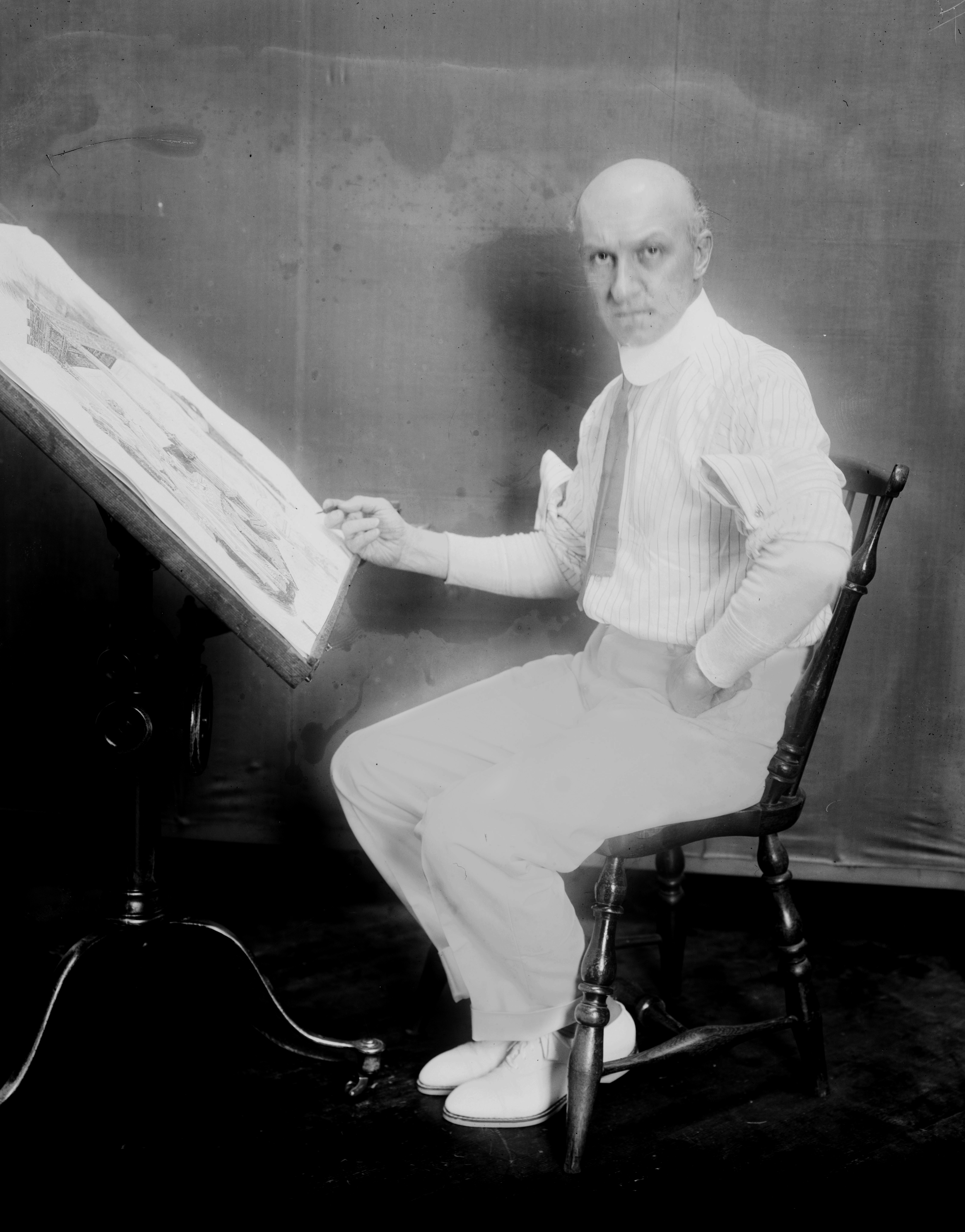
Orson Lowell

Orson Byron Lowell (1871–1956) was an American artist and illustrator of covers and interiors for magazines.

Born in Wyoming, Iowa, Lowell was the son of landscapist Milton H. Lowell. He was 11 years old when his family moved in 1882 to Chicago. Lowell attended public school in Chicago until 1887, when he began taking classes at the Art Institute of Chicago, where he studied with J.H. Vanderpoel and Oliver Dennett Grover.

In November 1893, Lowell moved to New York City to build his career. By 1905, his work was in high enough demand to allow him to buy a house in New Rochelle, New York while maintaining his studio in New York. New Rochelle came to be a well-known art colony and illustrator's community soon after his arrival. Residents there included Norman Rockwell, Edward Penfield, J. C. Leyendecker, Franklin Booth, and Coles Phillips.

== Magazines ==
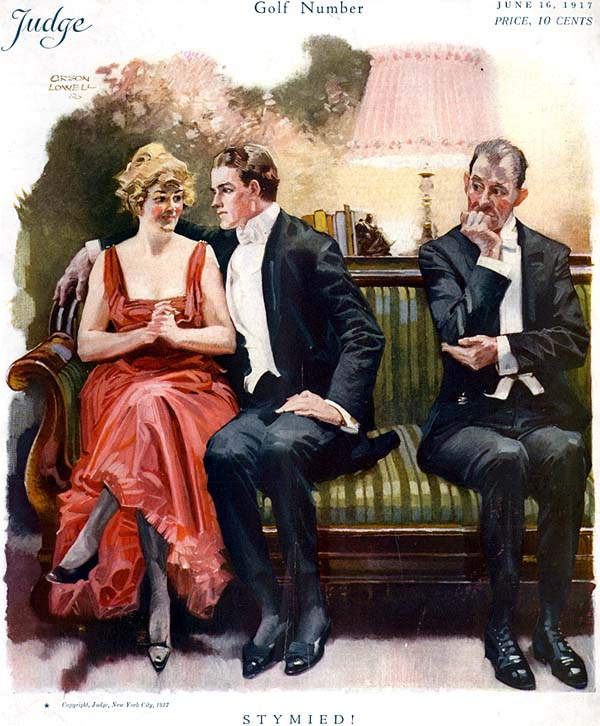
16 Jun 1917 Judge cover by Lowell

By 1907, he became known for his cartoons with a social message published in the humor magazine Life. A contemporary of illustrator Charles Dana Gibson, Lowell illustrated for major magazines, including American Girl, Century, Cosmopolitan, The Delineator, Judge, Ladies' Home Journal, Leslie's Weekly, McCall's, McClure's, Metropolitan Life, Puck, The Saturday Evening Post, Scribner's, Redbook, Vogue, and Woman's Home Companion.

Lowell was a very social individual, joined most of the arts clubs in New York and held positions in many of them. Among these were the Players Club, the Society of Illustrators (where he was among the first group of non-founding members), the Guild of Free Lance Artists (where he served as president 1924–25), the New Rochelle Art Association and the New Rochelle Public Library, where he was a trustee from 1930 until 1944.

== Exhibitions ==
In 2002, Lowell's work was included in Toast of the Town: Norman Rockwell and the Artists of New Rochelle, an exhibition of 25 New Rochelle artists, held at the Norman Rockwell Museum (Stockbridge, Massachusetts).
