= Bailey Arboretum =

Arboretum in Lattingtown, New York, United States

Coordinates: 40°53′12″N 73°35′01″W

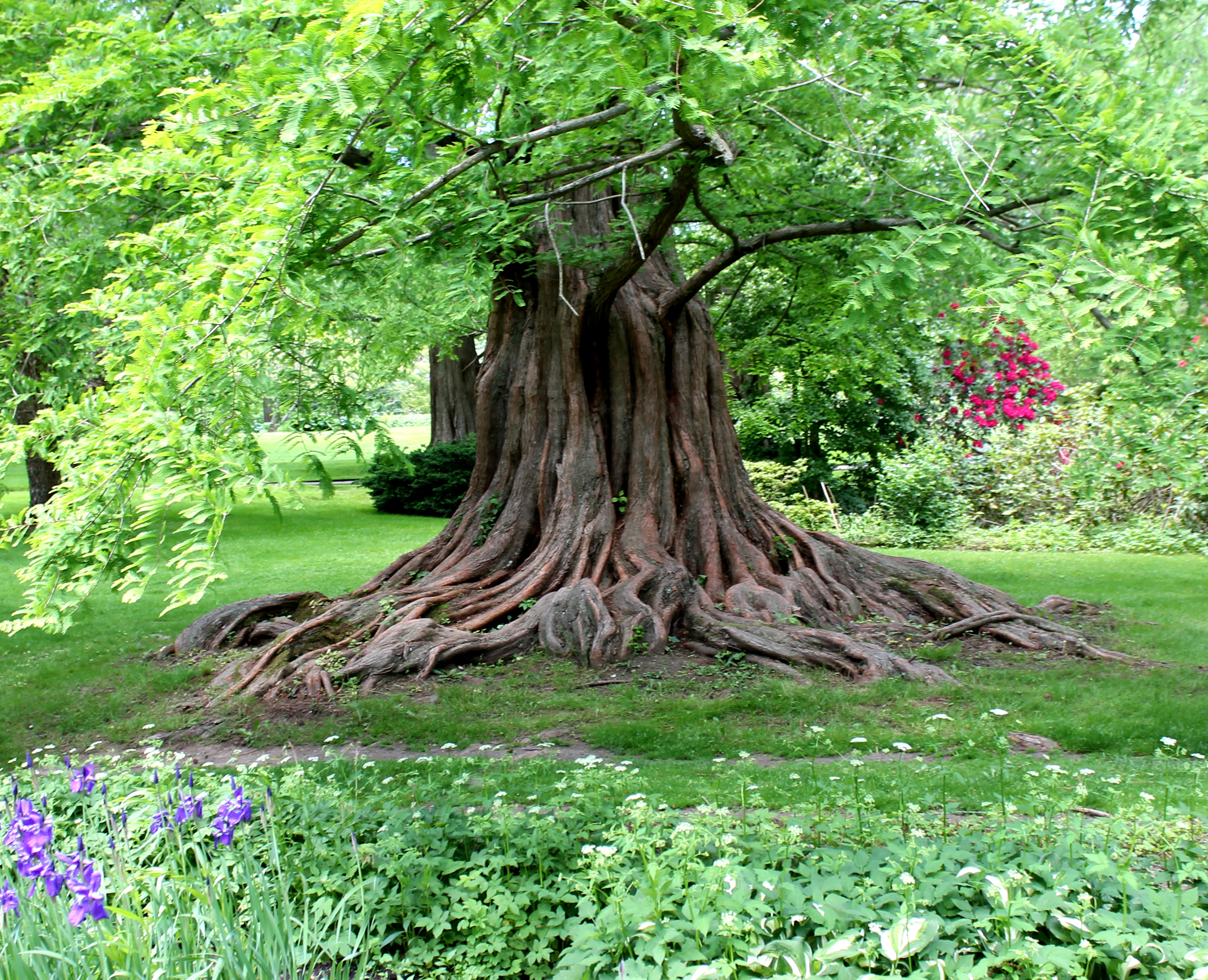
- Dawn redwood (Metasequoia glyptostroboides)
- Interactive map of Bailey Arboretum
- Location: Lattingtown, New York
- Founder: Frank Bailey
- Open: Open 7 days a week. Spring/Summer hours are 8 a.m. to 5 p.m. and Fall/Winter hours are 9 a.m. to 4 p.m.
- Parking: Fee for parking onsite.
- Website: Official website

Bailey Arboretum is a 42-acre (17 ha) arboretum located in Lattingtown, New York, a small village on the North Shore of Long Island. It opened to the public on Aug. 5, 1969 after being donated to Nassau County in 1968 by the heirs of Mr. and Mrs. Frank Bailey. Through an agreement with the Village of Lattingtown, admission to the arboretum was limited to 200 people at any one time.

== History ==
The arboretum was created by financier Frank Bailey, who used many rare trees and plantings. He purchased the property between 1911/1912 from Joseph R. Clark, a former president of the Board of aldermen of Brooklyn. Some of the first staff he hired after the purchase of the property was a gardener and gardening assistants. Bailey selected the trees and shrubs for the property, directed where to plant them, trimmed and pruned the tree and helped with transplanting. During the time period of 1916-1920, Bailey imported trees, shrubs and ornamentals from France.

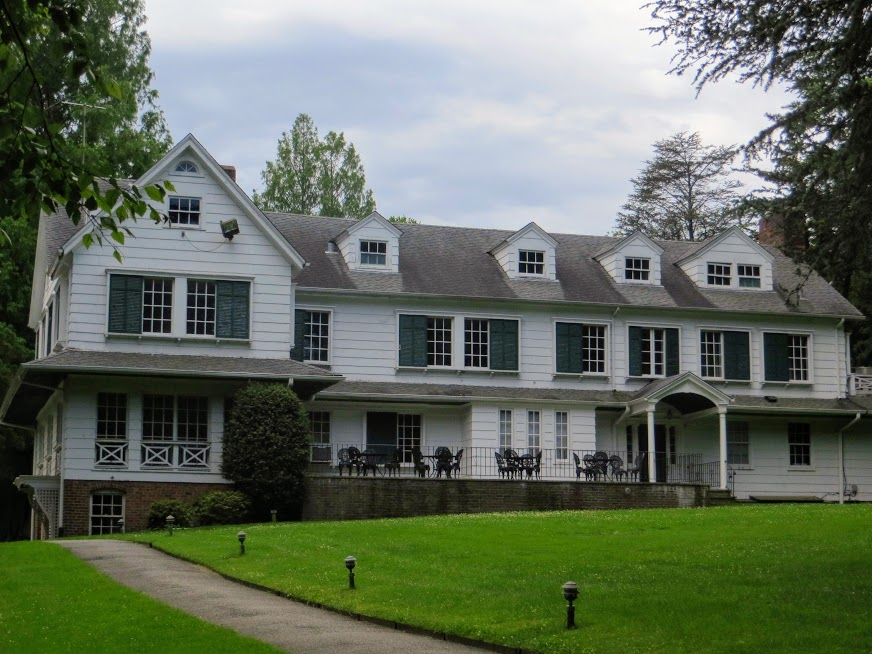
Munnysunk, summer home of Frank Bailey and his family.

The original farmhouse on his estate was once owned by an uncle of Winston Churchill's mother. This estate had been the summer home of the Baileys and was called "Munnyskunk." Besides the farmhouse, other buildings on the property include an educational center, visitors' cottage, workshops, garages and storage sheds.

Bailey, nicknamed "Mr. Brooklyn" because of his large real estate business in Brooklyn, was president of Title Guarantee & Trust Company and treasurer of Union College in Schenectady, New York from 1901-1953. His real estate holdings included areas in Brownsville, Brooklyn, Bensonhurst, Brooklyn, Borough Park, Brooklyn, and Long Beach, New York. He successfully led the Brooklyn Botanical Garden through the Great Depression. This put him in contact with the great plant collectors of the world and enabled him to amass this collection. Other gifts followed including a rare dwarf evergreen collection.

Frank Bailey died on Aug. 26, 1953 at home. He was 88 years old. His wife, Marie Louise Lambert Bailey died on Feb. 19, 1964, also at home. She was 87 years old.

== Tree types ==
Stewarded by the Friends of Bailey Arboretum, the arboretum of exotic trees covers 98% of the property. The property also includes a carriage barn with meeting rooms, a greenhouse, two man made ponds, 35 acres (14 ha) of woodland trails, and "Munnysunk", a 200-year-old manor house used for education, fundraising and rentals.

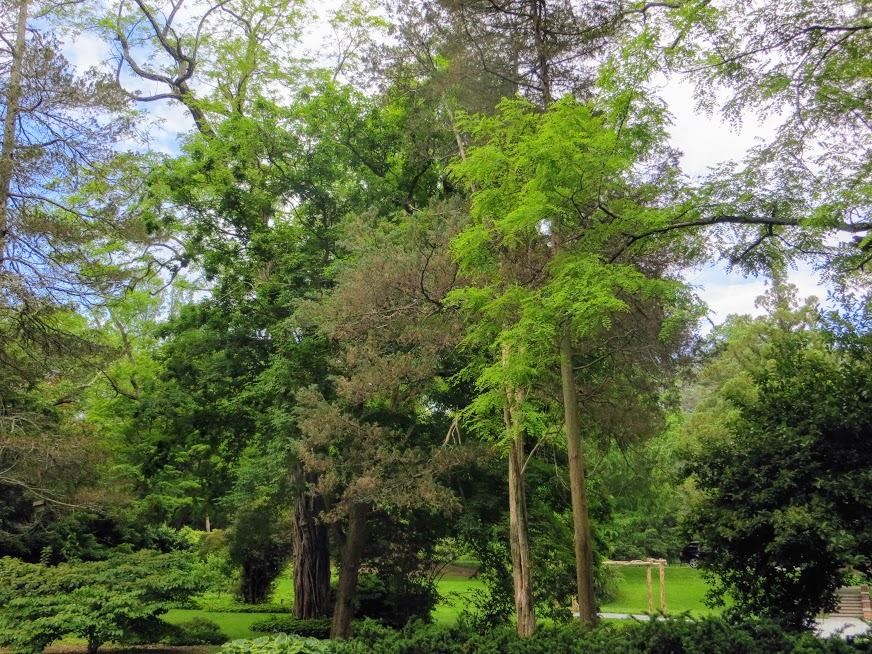
A view of some of the variety of trees at the arboretum.

The collection of exotic trees makes Bailey Arboretum unique. Two hundred different species of trees are registered on Arbnet's international database, and another 300 trees are pending identification. Fifteen champion trees remain in the Bailey Collection including the dawn redwood planted by seed from China in 1947. In 2007, the Metasequoia Society found the Bailey tree to have the largest girth of any dawn redwood in the world. Seven acres (2.8 ha) are landscaped grounds with a rose, perennial, vegetable and annual gardens.

A number of trees were destroyed in March 2018 due to the high winds generated by Winter storms Riley and Quinn. Some of the trees were planted by Frank Bailey including a Linden tree and a Larch.

After the property was donated in 1968, the county restored the farmhouse and created a visitors parking lot. In addition, The North Shore Garden Club donated the materials to create a new rose garden in 1969. The Matinecock Garden Club sponsored the Iris and Perennial Garden.

== Improvements ==
In 1973, students from the Boards of Cooperative Educational Services (BOCES), created an interpretive nature trail as part of their coursework. As well as the trail, students transplanted plants and created bridges and dams.

The main building was beginning to fall into disrepair in the early 1990s so in November 1993, 13 decorators from the Locust Valley, New York area donated their time and funds to make the repairs themselves. They refurbished 15 rooms on the first and second floors of the building as well as one of the hallways. Walls were restored, plaster was repaired and a ceiling replaced in one of the bathrooms. Wall-to-wall carpeting for staircases and hallways was donated by the Locust Valley Chamber of Commerce.

In 2010, the North Shore Garden Club of Long Island, Inc. restored one of the greenhouses on the property. The greenhouse was dedicated on June 13, 2010 in honor of a former member of the Garden Club, Saidie E. Scudder. Another greenhouse on the property was torn down in 2008 because of its state of disrepair. The restored greenhouse was repaired following its original design including an exact copy of its main door. Other partners for this project included: Nassau County, Harry Whaley & Son, LLC, and Oakwood Construction.

As part of an Eagle Scout Service Project, renovations were recently made to Turtle Island, a small island off one of the ponds on the property. A birdhouse was installed, tree saplings were removed and signage was added describing the flora and fauna of the area.

== Specialized areas ==
There are several specialized areas at the Arboretum. Bailey Arboretum has one of the first sensory gardens on Long Island. It opened on Sept. 11, 1990. Handicap-accessible, it appeals to all senses enabling the sight- and mobility-impaired to enjoy a garden. This garden, called the Secret Walled Garden, is maintained by the Locust Valley Garden Club.

The Arboretum's Children's Habitat outdoor classroom is accredited by Nature Explore of the Arbor Day Foundation. It is the first accredited outdoor classroom located at an arboretum in New York State and has been certified since 2007. The Habitat has a picnic grove with tables, a music/movement area with a stage, a nature art area and a climbing/crawling area. Natural materials used include logs, stumps and wood chips. Recent improvements to the Children's Habitat include: new arts and crafts tables and chairs, outdoor chalkboards, log seating, storage lockers and a two level wooden house with a climbing wall and slide.

There is also a Bog garden for flowers and plants that prefer to grow in moist conditions and another garden with plants to attract butterflies and hummingbirds.

Three hiking trails cover a large part of the property. There a trail that circles around the Great Lawn and the Wide Loop and the Evergreen Arbor Trails cover 30 acres.

== Accreditation ==
In October 2014, the arboretum was awarded accreditation as a level II arboretum by the ArbNet Arboretum Accreditation Program. It is the only arboretum in the New York metropolitan area to achieve this accreditation. Over 125 species of trees were listed on the certification application. However, there are still many tree species at the arboretum that have not been identified.

A ceremony was held to celebrate this achievement on April 24, 2015 at which time a lace bark pine tree was planted - the first of its kind for the arboretum.

Level II accreditation criteria includes: having a minimum of 100 species of trees or woody plants, providing educational and public programming, and having a collections policy detailing the development and management of the plants in the arboretum. Other locations that have received Level II accreditation by ArbNet in the New York metropolitan area include: Brooklyn Botanic Gardens, Green-wood Cemetery and Woodlawn Cemetery.

== Education center ==
Bailey Arboretum is home to the Volunteers for Wildlife Hospital and Education Center. The wildlife hospital moved from the Caumsett State Park in Lloyd Harbor to the Bailey Arboretum in November 2011. The species at the center are all native to Long Island. The not-for-profit organization was created in 1982 and cares for about 2,000 injured or orphaned wild animals each year.

== Friends association ==
A volunteer group, Friends of Bailey Arboretum, was established in the late 1960s and operates the site for Nassau County. In 2010, it was noted that the group raised approximately $200,000 a year.

== See also ==
- List of botanical gardens in the United States
