= Cock-Cornelius House =

Historic house in New York, United States

- U.S. National Register of Historic Places
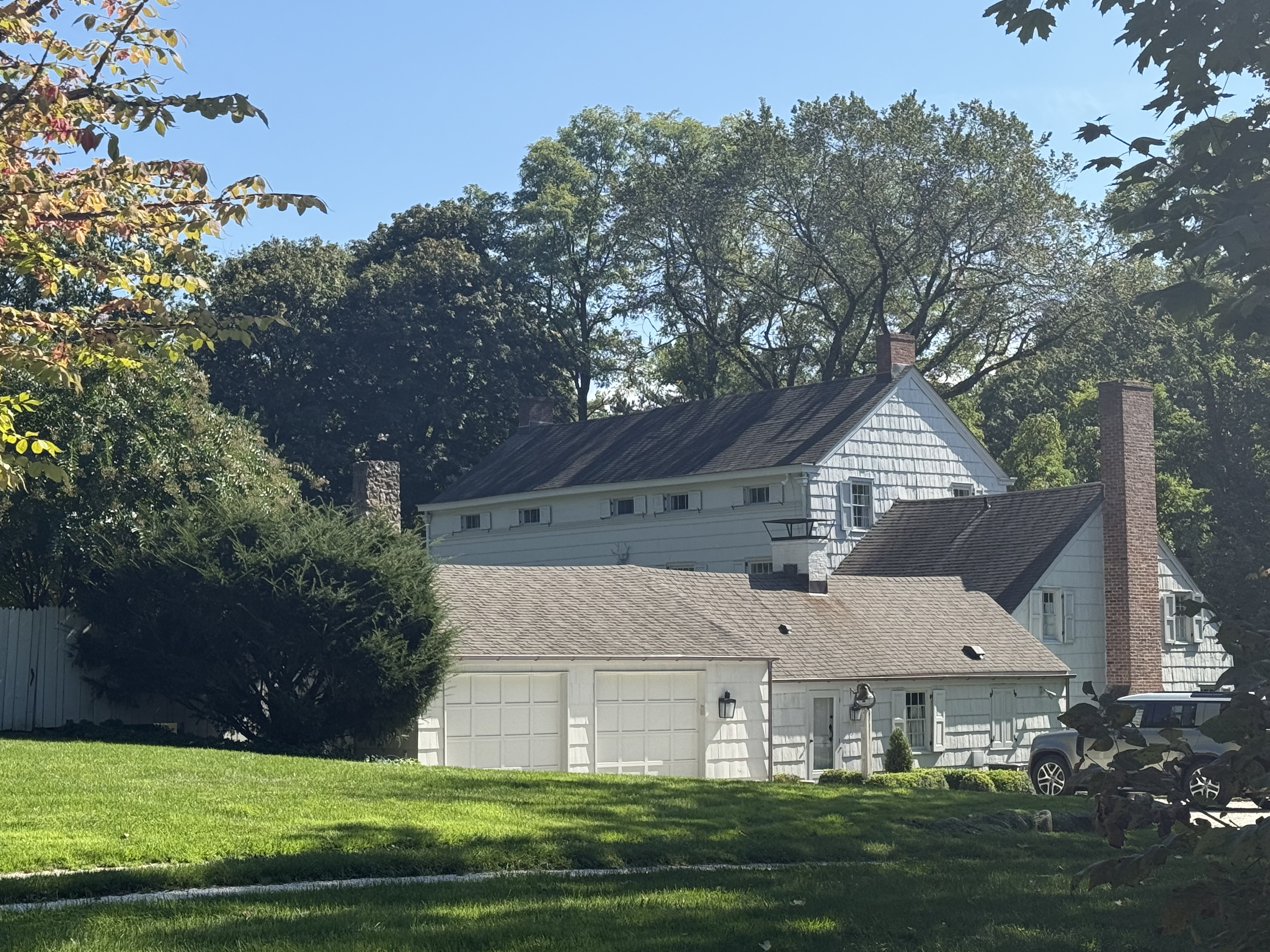
- Cock-Cornelius House, September 2025

- Location within New York Location within the United States
- Location: 34 Birch Hill Rd., Locust Valley, New York
- Coordinates: 40°52′27″N 73°35′17″W
- Area: 2.2 acres (0.89 ha)
- Built: c. 1668
- Architectural style: Federal
- NRHP reference No.: 06000157
- Added to NRHP: March 22, 2006

Cock-Cornelius House, also known as Wyckoff-Underhill House, is a historic home located at Locust Valley in Nassau County, New York. It is a 1- to 2 1/2-story, U-shaped wood-frame dwelling sheathed in wood shingles. The main block is 2 1/2 stories and five bays wide. Local lore suggests the home was built circa 1668, however this has been hard to explicitly confirm. The oldest section of the house to be successfully dated is said to be from the Federal period, about 1790. The house was later expanded in the 1840s and in the 1920s-1930s.

It was listed on the National Register of Historic Places in 2006.
