= Lucius Wolcott Hitchcock =

American illustrator, painter and educator

- Born: 1868; Ohio, U.S.
- Died: June 1942 (aged 73–74); New Rochelle, New York, U.S.
- Other name: Lucius W. Hitchcock
- Education: Art Students League of New York, Académie Julian
- Occupations: Artist, illustrator, and educator
- Known for: Illustration, Painting

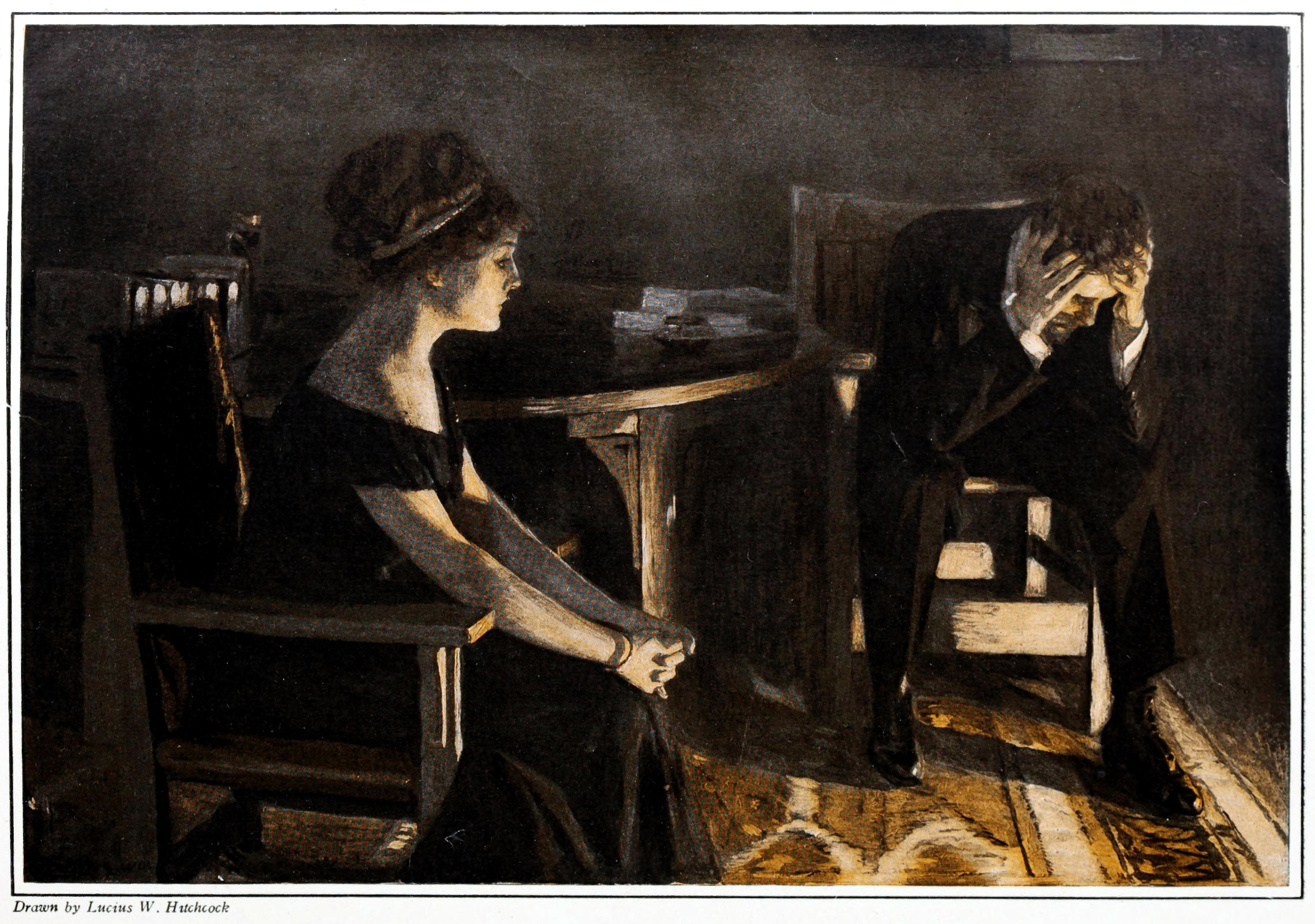
Illustration by L. W. Hitchcock, for the novel The Wild Olive (1910) by Basil King.

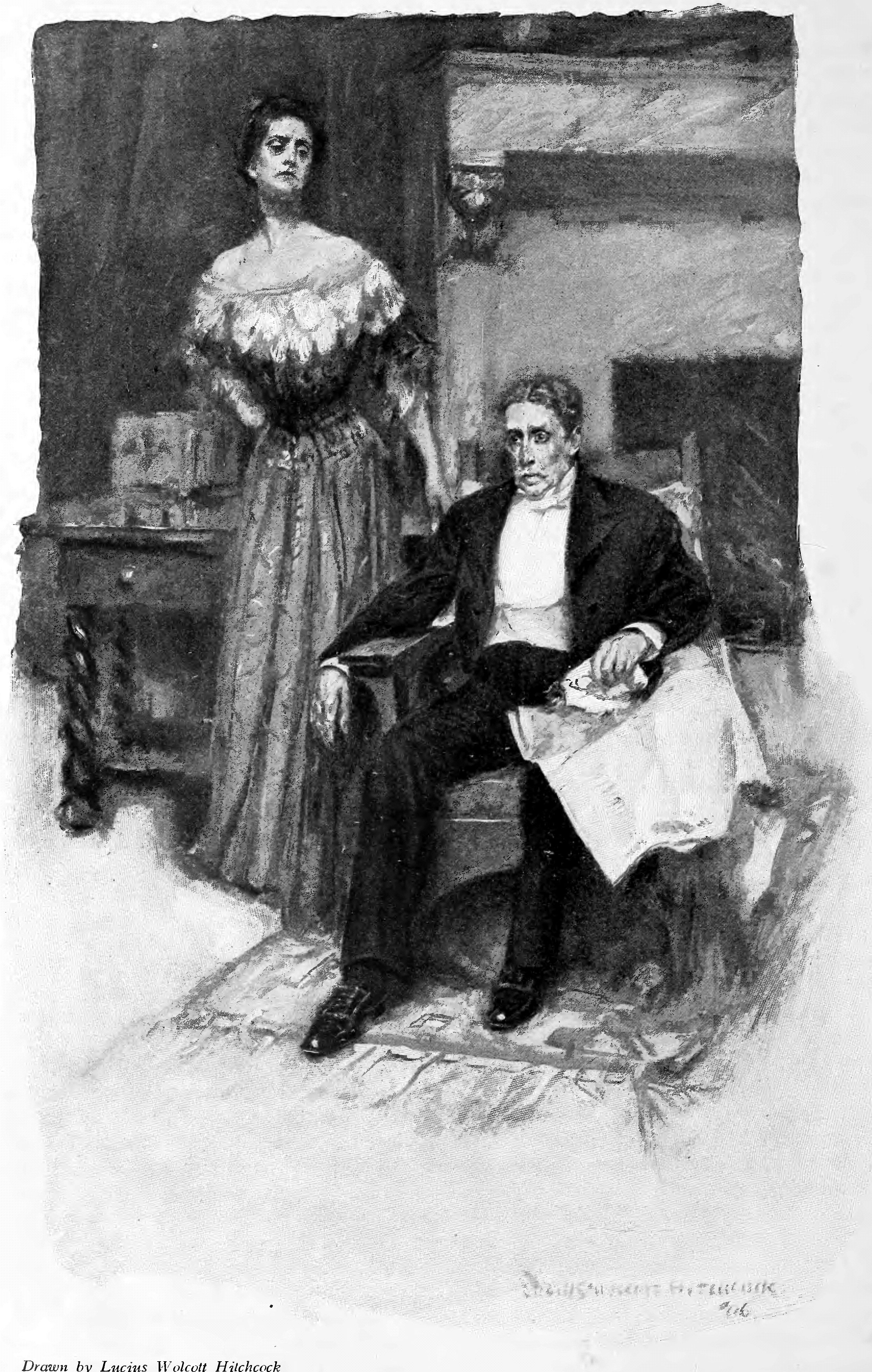
Illustration by L. W. Hitchcock, from Harper's Magazine (1907).

Lucius Wolcott Hitchcock (December 2, 1868 in Williamsfield Township, Ohio–1942) was an American artist, illustrator and educator, known for his paintings.

== About ==
Lucius Wolcott Hitchcock was born 1868 in Ohio. He studied at Art Students League of New York and studied at Académie Julian in Paris, with artists Jules Joseph Lefebvre, Benjamin Constant, and Jean Paul Laurens.

Hitchcock worked as an illustrator for Harper's Bazaar magazine, Scribner's Magazine, Woman's Home Companion, among other publications.

In 1894, he moved to Buffalo, New York, where he led the Art Students' League of Buffalo. Hitchcock was known for his figure and portrait painting. A year later, in 1895, he married Sarah Hyde McNeil of Akron, Ohio, and together the couple lived in Buffalo. He remained teaching at Art Students' League of Buffalo for a decade.

In 1905, Hitchcock moved to New York City to teach at Chase School of Art (now known as Parson School of Design).

He was a member of the Buffalo Society of Artists, the Society of Illustrators, Salmagundi Club, and the New Rochelle Art Association.

Hitchcock died at the age of 73 after a long illness, in New Rochelle, New York, in 1942.

== Publications ==
A select list of books published with Hitchcock's illustrations, in descending order by year published.

- Porter, Eleanor H. (1919). Dawn. Lucius Wolcott Hitchcock (illustrator). New York City, NY: Houghton Mifflin company.
- Jordan, Kate (1913). The Creeping Tides: a Romance of an Old Neighborhood. Lucius Wolcott Hitchcock (illustrator). Boston, MA: Little, Brown and Company.
- King, Basil (1910). The Wild Olive: A Novel. Lucius Wolcott Hitchcock (illustrator). New York City, NY: Grosset and Dunlap.
- Twain, Mark (1907). A Horse's Tale. Lucius Wolcott Hitchcock (illustrator). New York City, NY: Harper and Brothers.
- Deland, Margaret (1903). Dr. Lavendar's People. Lucius Wolcott Hitchcock (illustrator). New York City, NY: Harper and Brothers. ISBN 9781404767034.
