= George Underhill House =

Historic house in New York, United States

- U.S. National Register of Historic Places
- Location within New York Location within the United States
- Location: 28 Factory Pond Rd., Locust Valley, New York
- Coordinates: 40°53′45″N 73°34′40″W
- Area: 5.1 acres (2.1 ha)
- Built: 1790
- NRHP reference No.: 03000592
- Added to NRHP: July 5, 2003

George Underhill House, also known as Wayside, is a historic home located at Locust Valley in Nassau County, New York, USA. It is a rambling U-shaped wood-frame house with 1-, 1 1/2- and 2-story sections dated to about 1790. The original section is a 1 1/2-story timber-frame structure with a moderately pitched gable roof. Also on the property is a 1 1/2-story, wood-frame tenant house.

It was listed on the National Register of Historic Places in 2003.
