= Lattingtown, New York =

- Village
- Incorporated Village of Lattingtown
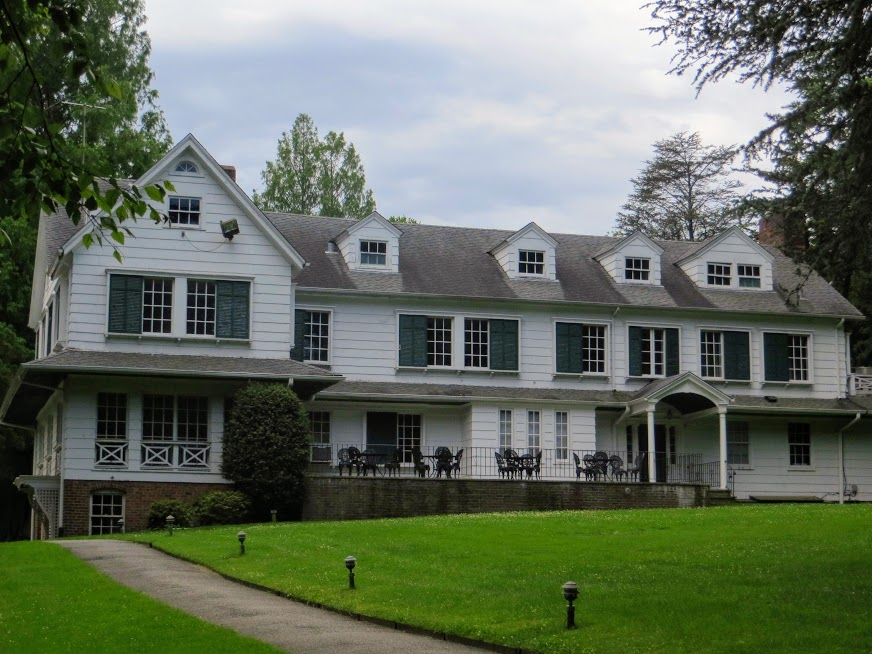
- The Bailey Arboretum in Lattingtown in 2018

- Location in Nassau County and the state of New York

- Location on Long Island Location within the state of New York
- Coordinates: 40°53′40″N 73°35′42″W
- Country: United States
- State: New York
- County: Nassau
- Town: Oyster Bay
- Incorporated: 1931
- Named for: the Latting family

Area
  - Total: 3.82 sq mi (9.90 km^{2})
  - Land: 3.75 sq mi (9.71 km^{2})
  - Water: 0.077 sq mi (0.20 km^{2})
- Elevation: 62 ft (19 m)

Population (2020)
  - Total: 1,881
  - Density: 502.0/sq mi (193.82/km^{2})
- Time zone: UTC-5 (Eastern (EST))
  - Summer (DST): UTC-4 (EDT)
- ZIP Code: 11560 (Locust Valley)
- Area codes: 516, 363
- FIPS code: 36-41432
- GNIS feature ID: 0955075
- Website: villageoflattingtown.org

Lattingtown is a village located within the Town of Oyster Bay in Nassau County, on the North Shore of Long Island, in New York, United States. The population was 1,881 at the time of the 2020 census.

== History ==
The area of marsh along the coast was occupied by a band of Lenape, known as the Matinecock – a name long associated with the area.

The Matinecock sold the area in 1660 to Richard Latting and his son, Josiah Latting. The Lattings sold marsh reeds for use in thatched-roof houses. The same family later established the hamlet of Lattingtown at Marlborough, Ulster County, New York, north of Manhattan.

Lattingtown incorporated as a village in 1931.

The 1986 film The Money Pit was partially filmed at a run-down house in Lattingtown.

Soong Meiling (also known as Madame Chiang), the former renowned First Lady of China, spent the latter years of her life in America here, and passed away in her house in Lattingtown.

== Geography ==
According to the United States Census Bureau, the village has a total area of 3.8 square miles (9.8 km^{2}), of which 3.8 square miles (9.8 km^{2}) is land and 0.04 square miles (0.10 km^{2}) – or 1.05% – is water.

== Demographics ==
Historical population
Census	Pop.	Note	%±
1940	613		—
1950	745		21.5%
1960	1,461		96.1%
1970	1,773		21.4%
1980	1,749		−1.4%
1990	1,859		6.3%
2000	1,860		0.1%
2010	1,739		−6.5%
2020	1,881		8.2%
U.S. Decennial Census

=== Racial and ethnic composition ===
Lattingtown village, New York – Racial and ethnic composition Note: the US Census treats Hispanic/Latino as an ethnic category. This table excludes Latinos from the racial categories and assigns them to a separate category. Hispanics/Latinos may be of any race.
Race / Ethnicity (NH = Non-Hispanic)	Pop 2000	Pop 2010	Pop 2020	% 2000	% 2010	% 2020
White alone (NH)	1,725	1,616	1,613	92.74%	92.93%	85.75%
Black or African American alone (NH)	10	8	5	0.54%	0.46%	0.27%
Native American or Alaska Native alone (NH)	0	0	0	0.00%	0.00%	0.00%
Asian alone (NH)	65	47	81	3.49%	2.70%	4.31%
Native Hawaiian or Pacific Islander alone (NH)	0	0	1	0.00%	0.00%	0.05%
Other race alone (NH)	2	1	8	0.11%	0.06%	0.43%
Mixed race or Multiracial (NH)	15	26	56	0.81%	1.50%	2.98%
Hispanic or Latino (any race)	43	41	117	2.31%	2.36%	6.22%
Total	1,860	1,739	1,881	100.00%	100.00%	100.00%

=== 2020 census ===
As of the census of 2000, there were 1,860 people, 627 households, and 509 families residing in the village. The population density was 491.9 inhabitants per square mile (189.9/km^{2}). There were 688 housing units at an average density of 182.0 per square mile (70.3/km^{2}). The racial makeup of the village was 94.46% White, 0.59% African American, 3.49% Asian, 0.38% from other races, and 1.08% from two or more races. Hispanic or Latino of any race were 2.31% of the population.

There were 627 households, out of which 37.2% had children under the age of 18 living with them, 73.0% were married couples living together, 5.3% had a female householder with no husband present, and 18.8% were non-families. 16.1% of all households were made up of individuals, and 8.5% had someone living alone who was 65 years of age or older. The average household size was 2.93 and the average family size was 3.25.

In the village, the population was spread out, with 26.2% under the age of 18, 4.6% from 18 to 24, 24.0% from 25 to 44, 31.0% from 45 to 64, and 14.2% who were 65 years of age or older. The median age was 42 years. For every 100 females, there were 93.3 males. For every 100 females age 18 and over, there were 91.5 males.

The median income for a household in the village was $136,807, and the median income for a family was $156,462. Males had a median income of $100,000 versus $44,063 for females. The per capita income for the village was $76,260. About 2.1% of families and 4.5% of the population were below the poverty line, including 1.5% of those under age 18 and 6.6% of those age 65 or over.

== Government ==
As of August 2021, the Mayor of Lattingtown is Robert W. Fagiola, the Deputy Mayor is Carol M. Harrington, and the Village Trustees are Mark DeNatale, Stephen Ely, Carol M. Harrington, and Andrea Volpe.

== Landmarks ==
- Bailey Arboretum (named after longtime residents Frank and Marie Louise Bailey)
- Underhill Burying Ground, a family cemetery of the Underhills

== See also ==
- List of municipalities in New York
- Matinecock, New York
