= Edward Penfield =

American illustrator

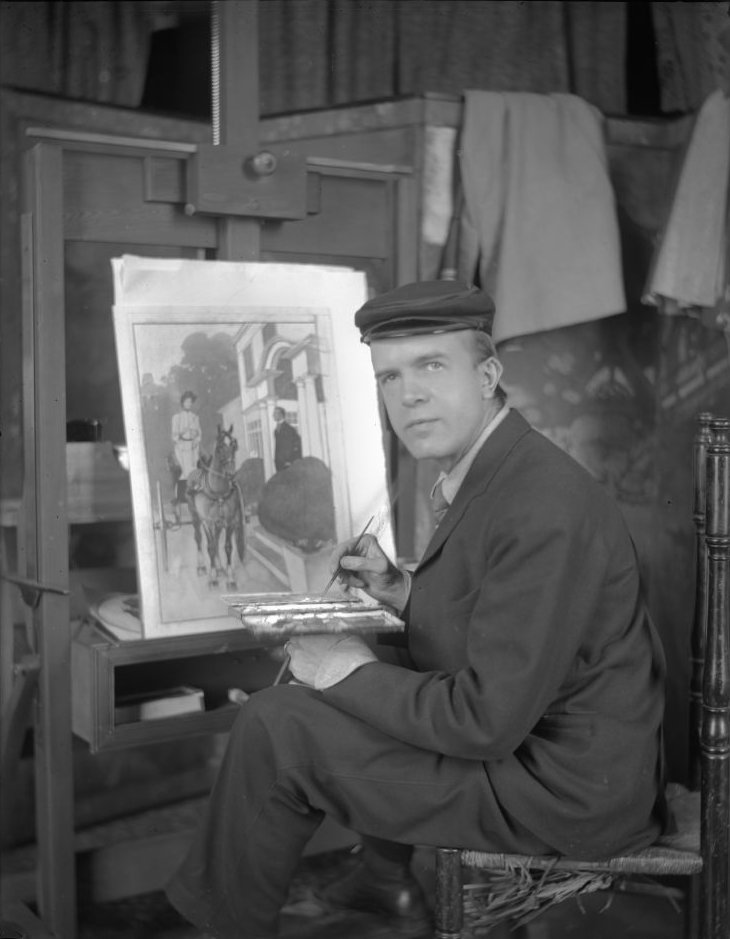
- Penfield circa 1900
- Born: June 2, 1866; Brooklyn, New York
- Died: February 8, 1925 (aged 58)
- Education: Art Students League of New York

Edward Penfield (June 2, 1866 – February 8, 1925) was an American illustrator in the era known as the "Golden Age of American Illustration" and he is considered the father of the American poster. His work has been included in almost every major book on American Illustration or the history of the poster. He is also a major figure in the evolution of graphic design.

== Youth and training ==
He was born June 2, 1866, in Brooklyn, New York, to Ellen Lock Moore and Josiah B. Penfield. He first studied at New York's Art Students League. He worked under George de Forest Brush, who was known for his romantic scenes of American Indian life. He first worked for Harper's Weekly and later became art director. He developed his own unique style of simplified figures with bold outlines in settings free of extraneous detail. He believed, "A design that needs study is not a poster, no matter how well executed." He wrote and published a book titled Holland Sketches, which was published by Scribner's in 1907.

Initials of Edward Penfield on a 1918 poster.

Penfield lived in New Rochelle, New York, a popular art colony among actors, writers and artists of the period. The community was most well known for its unprecedented number of prominent American illustrators. He was one of the founding members of the New Rochelle Art Association which was organized in 1912.

== Poster designs ==
His posters were bold and stood out from a distance with great clarity. As artists like Alphonse Mucha, Théophile Steinlen and Toulouse-Lautrec popularized the poster in Europe, Penfield accomplished the same feat in the United States. For his posters, Penfield utilized simple shapes and a limited palette of colors that lent themselves to the primitive methods of reproduction of the era.

== Gallery ==
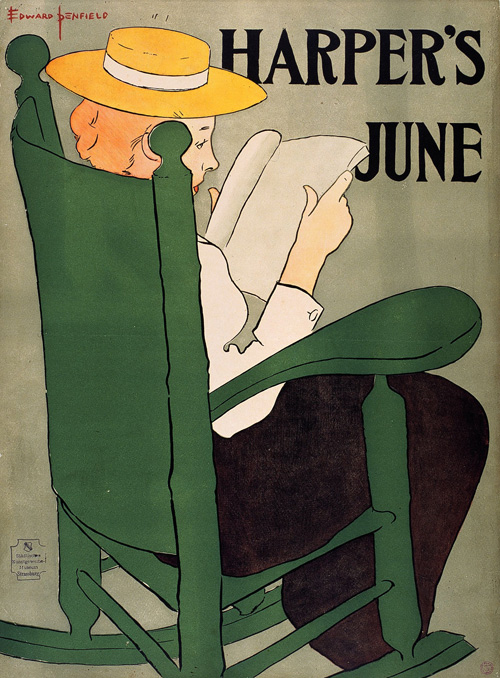
Harper's Magazine, June 1896

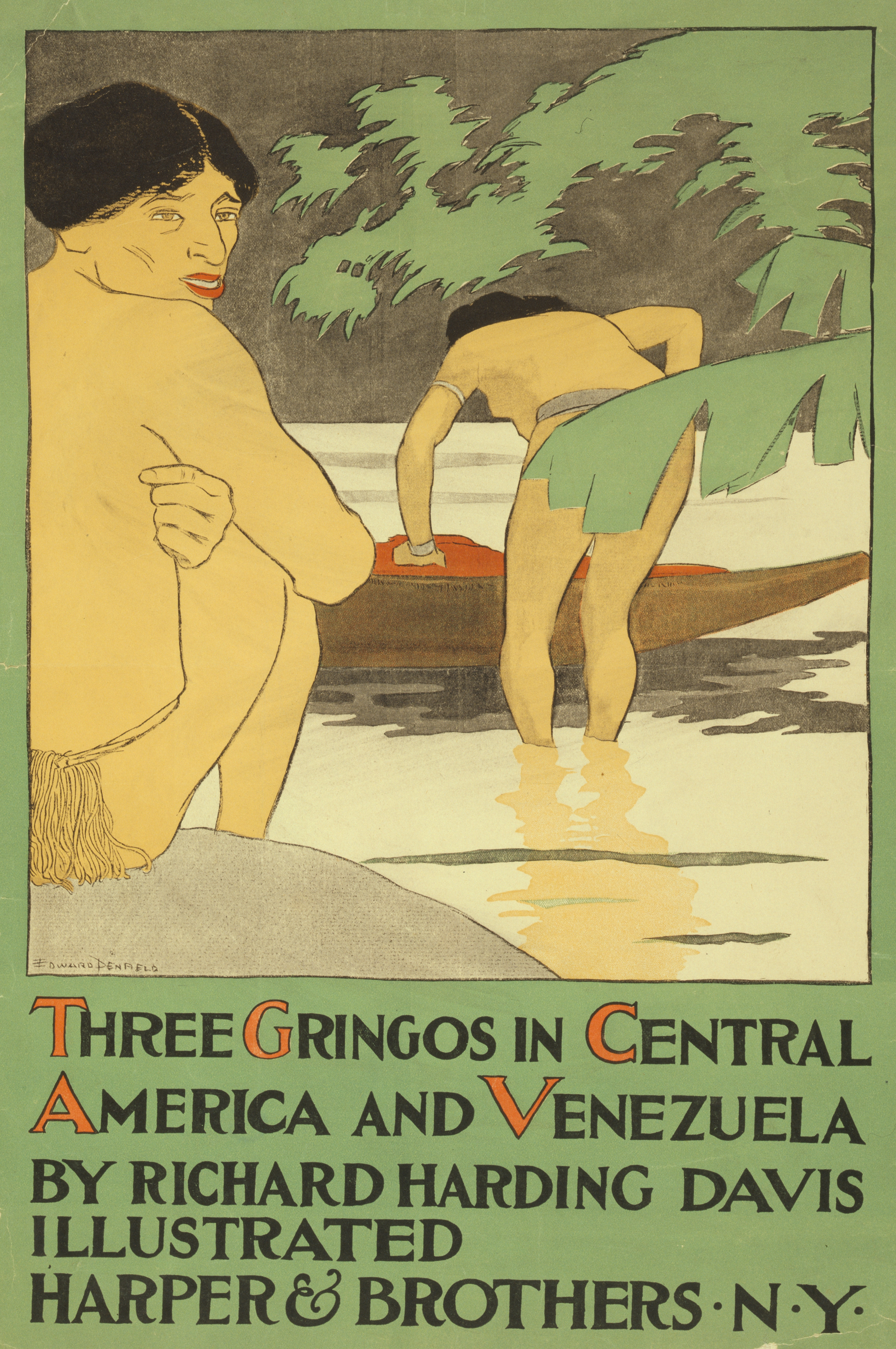
Book cover: Three Gringos by Richard Harding Davis, 1896

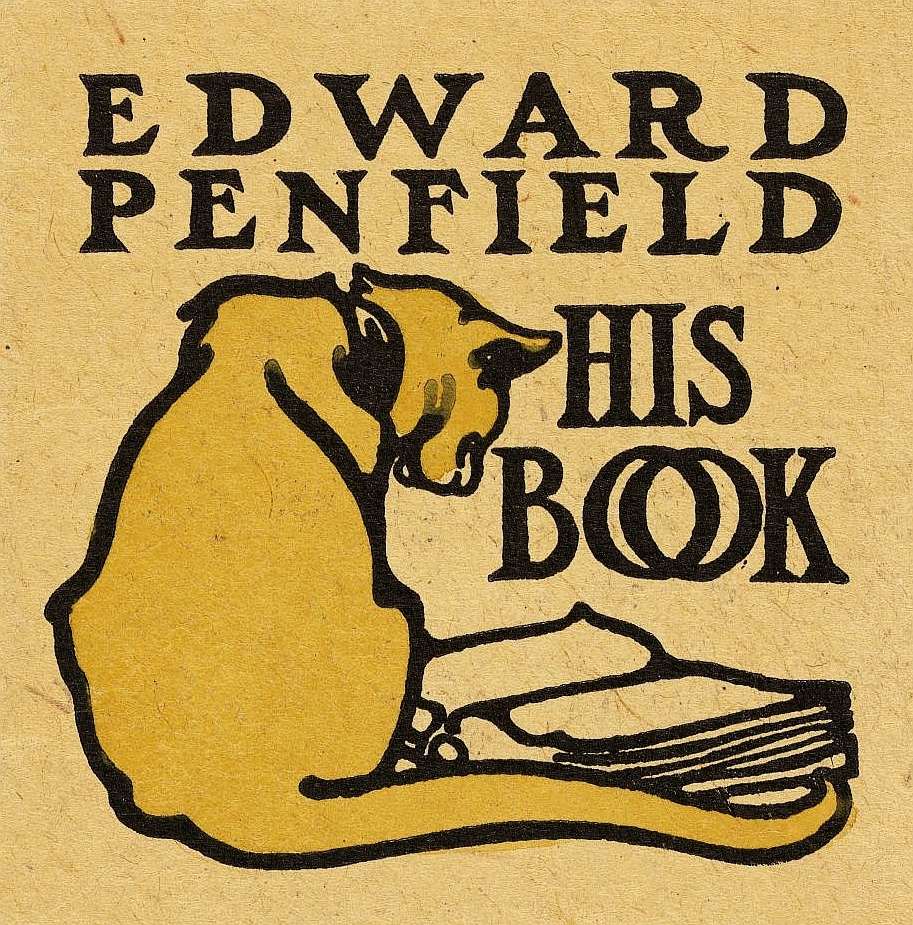
Exlibris

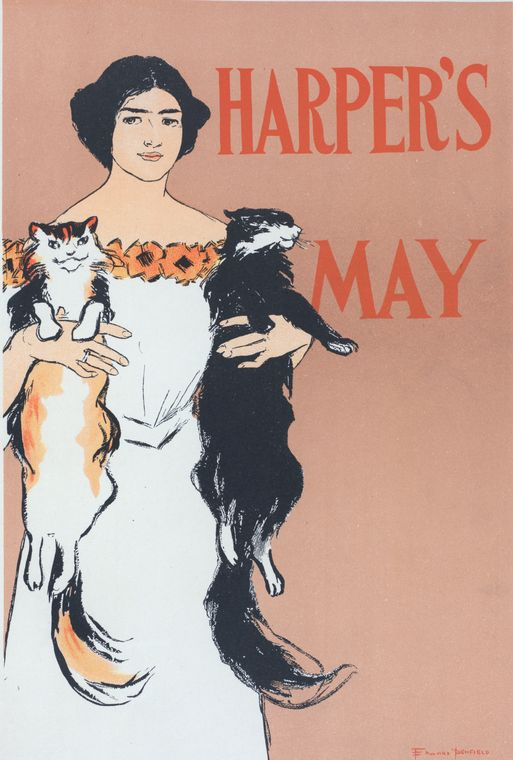
Harper's Magazine, May 1897

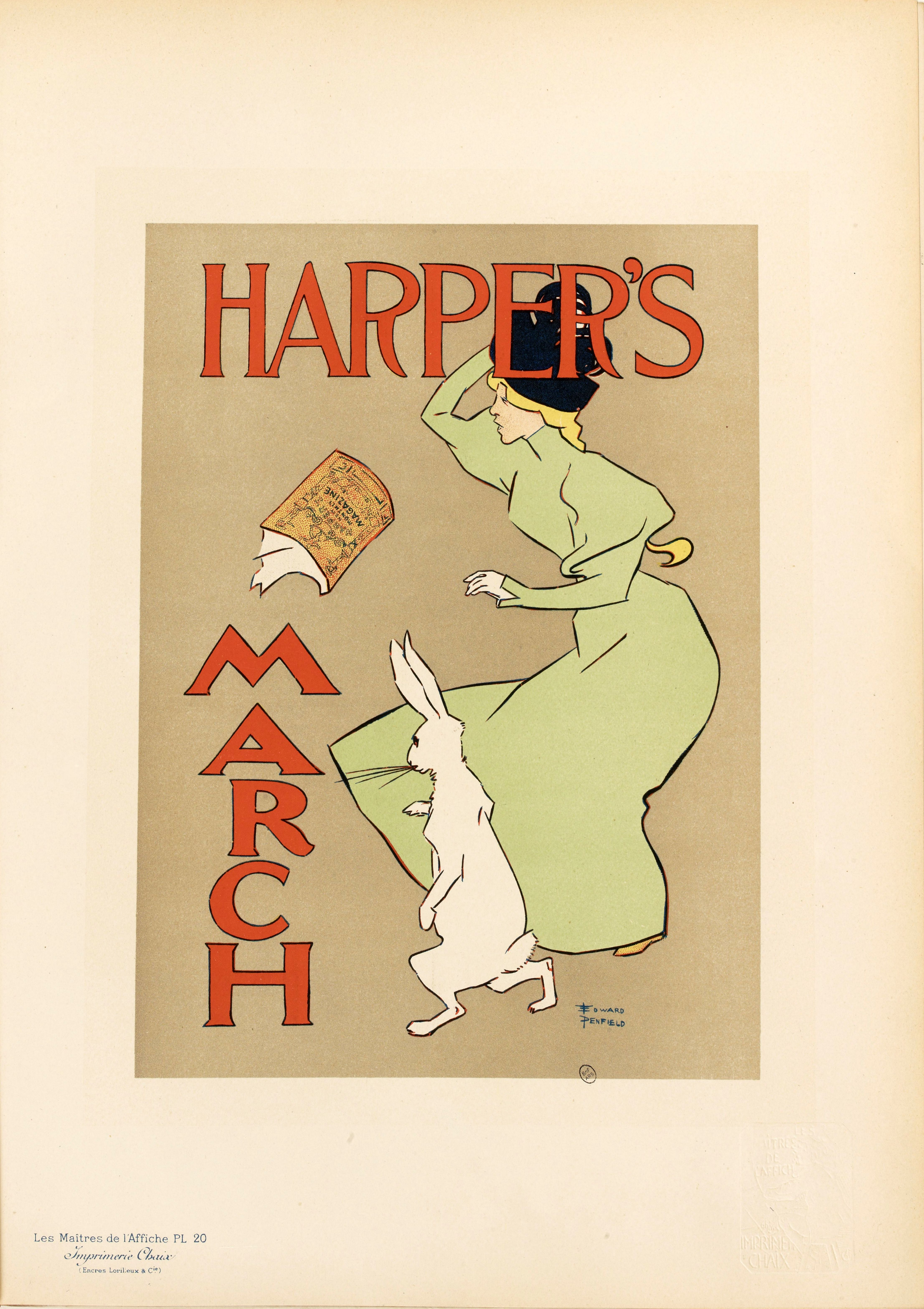
Poster published in Les Maîtres de l'Affiche

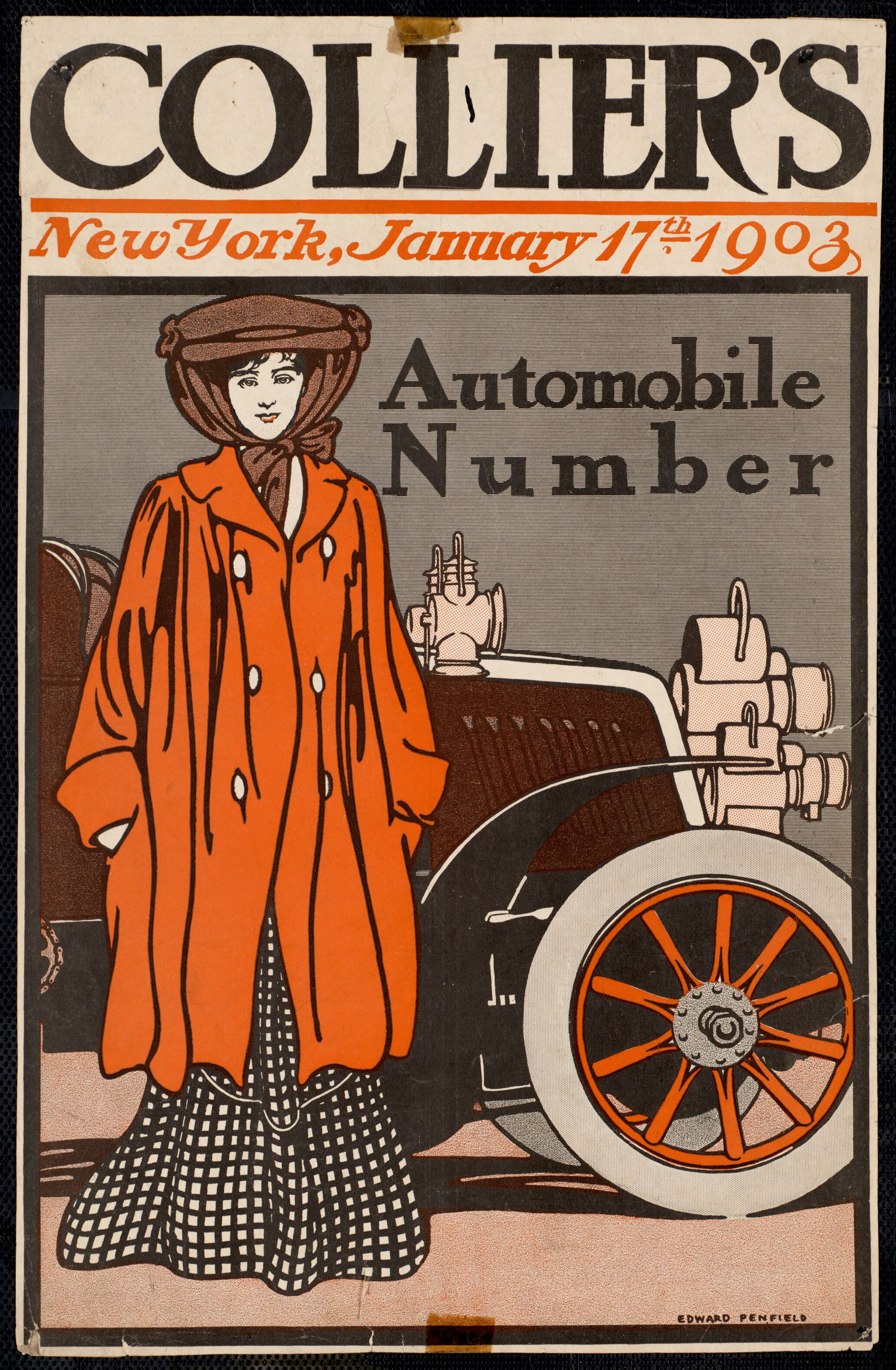
Collier's automobile number, New York, January 17th, 1903; from the American Art Posters 1890-1920 collection of the Boston Public Library
