= George T. Tobin =

American illustrator and artist

George Timothy Tobin (1864–May 6, 1956) was an American illustrator and artist.

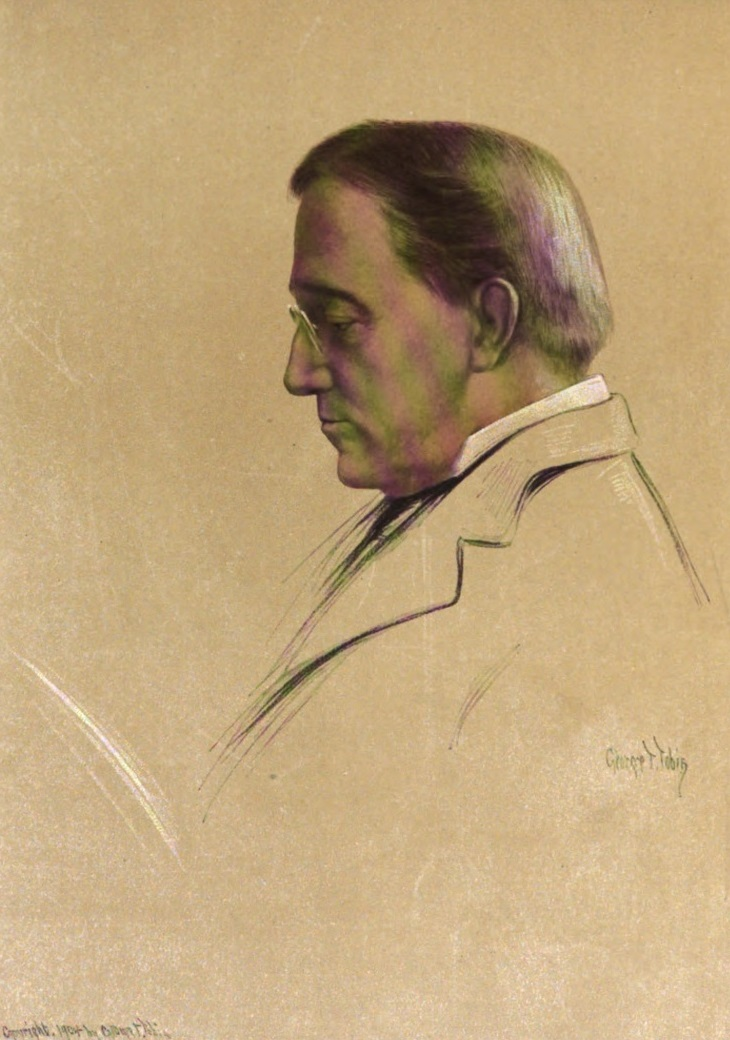
Portrait of Hamilton Wright Mabie by George T. Tobin (1904).

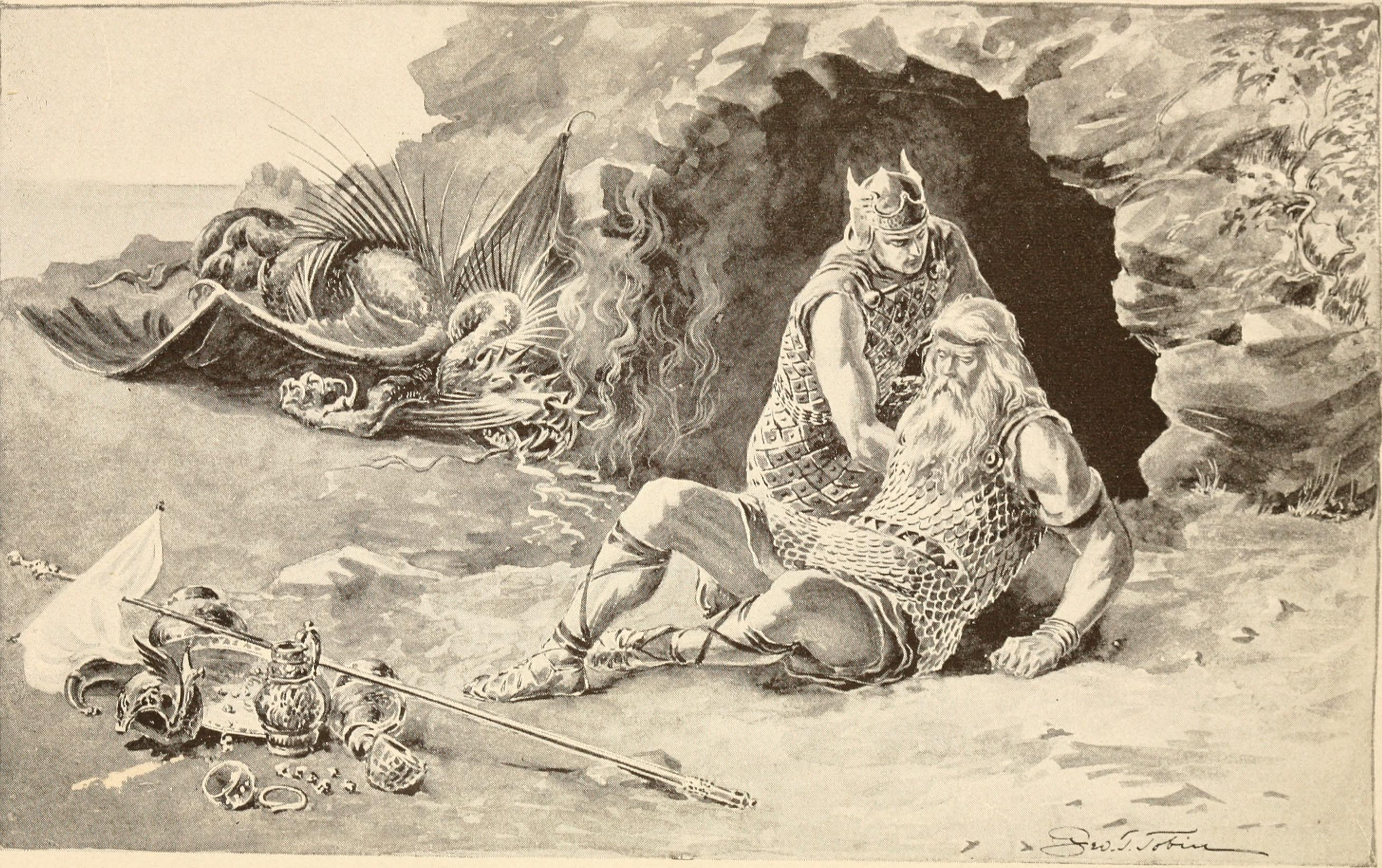
Illustration of Siegfried and Beowulf by George T. Tobin (1909).

== Biography ==
Tobin was a native of Weybridge, Vermont, and later settled in New Rochelle, New York, where he was a founding member of the New Rochelle Art Association. He produced illustrations for magazines like Harper's Bazaar (cover, December 1906), The Century, Publishers Weekly, and St. Nicholas. He illustrated children's books by authors such as Ruth Ogden and Charles Dickens. He produced a series of drawings of American presidents and other notables like critic Hamilton Wright Mabie.

Tobin worked in watercolor, ink, pencil, pastel, and (later) drypoint etching. His work is in the collection of the Smithsonian Institution, the National Museum of American Illustration, the Fogg Art Museum, and the New York Public Library.
