= Remington Schuyler =

American painter (1884–1955)

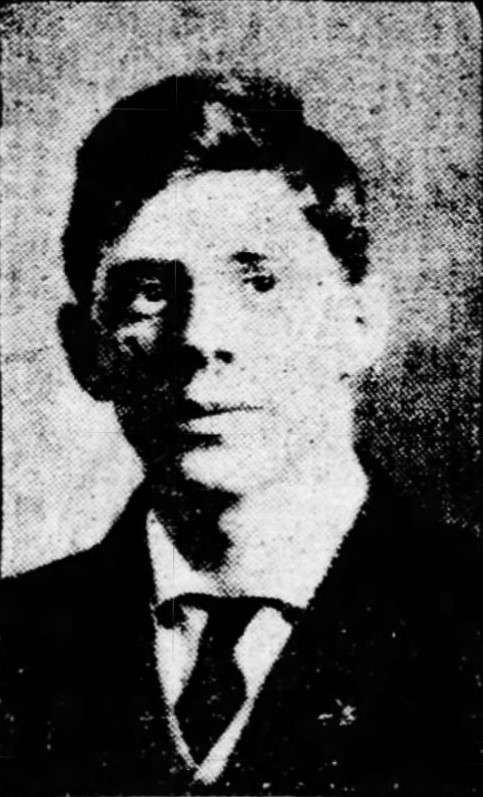
Schuyler in 1906

Remington Schuyler (1884–1955) was an American painter, illustrator and writer during the early to mid twentieth century. He was born in Buffalo, New York and was named after Frederic Remington, a distant cousin of his mother and an accomplished artist from the period.

After graduating from high school Schuyler studied at Washington University. He went on to receive scholarships to the National Academy in Rome and the Académie Julian in Paris after which he spent time studying at the Art Students League in New York with the influential draftsman, George Bridgman. In 1906 Schuyler studied with Howard Pyle in Wilmington, Delaware. Thanks to his association with Howard Pyle, Schuyler landed his first published illustration on the cover of The Saturday Evening Post, which he was soon working regularly for it along with Pearson's and Munsey's Magazine

In 1916 Schuyler moved to 76 Huguenot Street in New Rochelle, New York, a prestigious artist community with neighbors such as J. C. Leyendecker, and Norman Rockwell. New Rochelle was also the home of his recently deceased namesake, Frederic Remington.

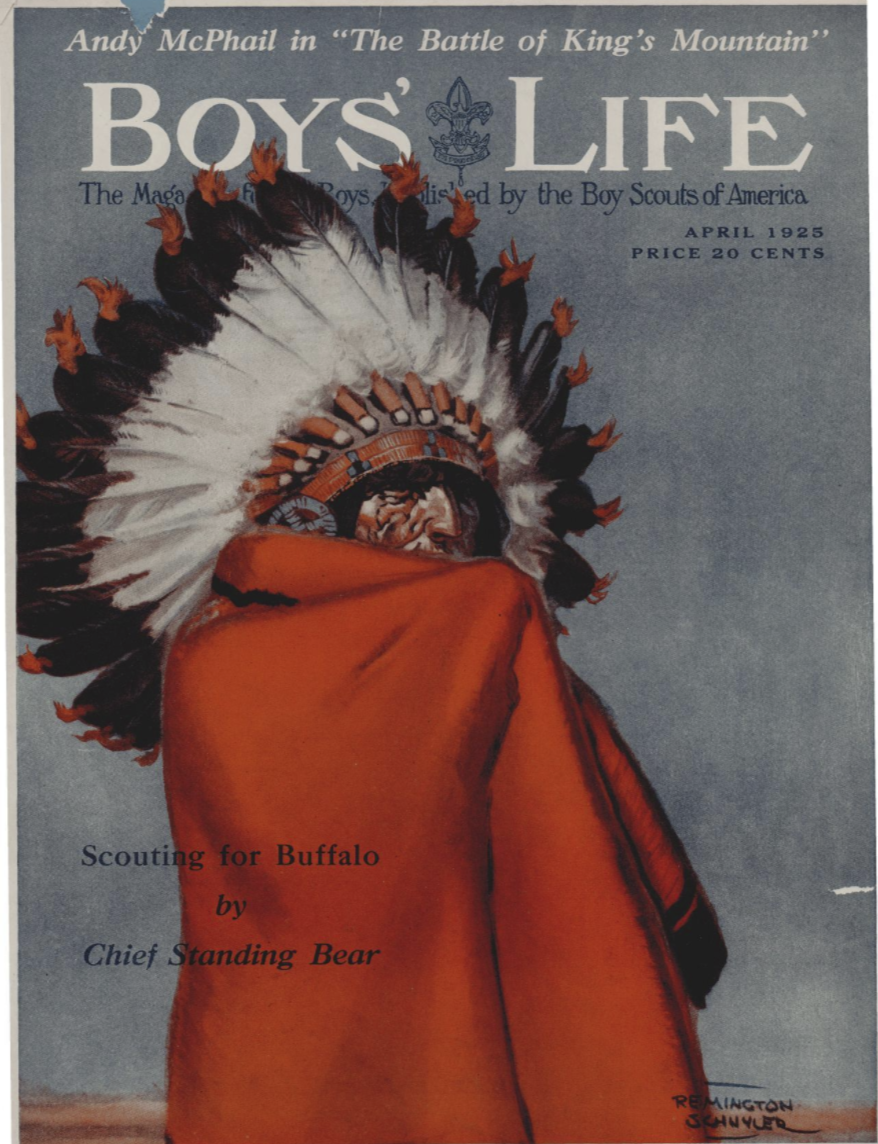
April 1925 Boys' Life cover by Schuyler

After the Great war, and through the 1920s, Schuyler worked steadily doing interior illustrations for Life, St. Nicholas and Century magazines. He also painted cover illustrations for pulp magazines, such as Frontier Stories, Short Stories, West and Wild West Weekly.

Schuyler did illustrations for Boys' Life and the Boy Scout Handbook as part of his thirty years service as a volunteer for the Boy Scouts. Other books illustrated by Schuyler included Daniel Boone, Wilderness Scout by Stewart Edward White, Indian Hunting Grounds and Great White Buffalo. He also was active as a mural painter and was editor of the Architectural Record for a period. During the Depression years, he painted many covers for pulp magazines and worked as a muralist for the WPA artist's program in Connecticut.

After the end of the pulp era, Schuyler moved back to his birth state, Missouri, and taught art at Missouri Valley College. He died in 1955 at the age of 71.
