= Knickerbocker Building (New Rochelle, New York) =

- Knickerbocker Press Building
- U.S. National Register of Historic Places
- New York State Register of Historic Places
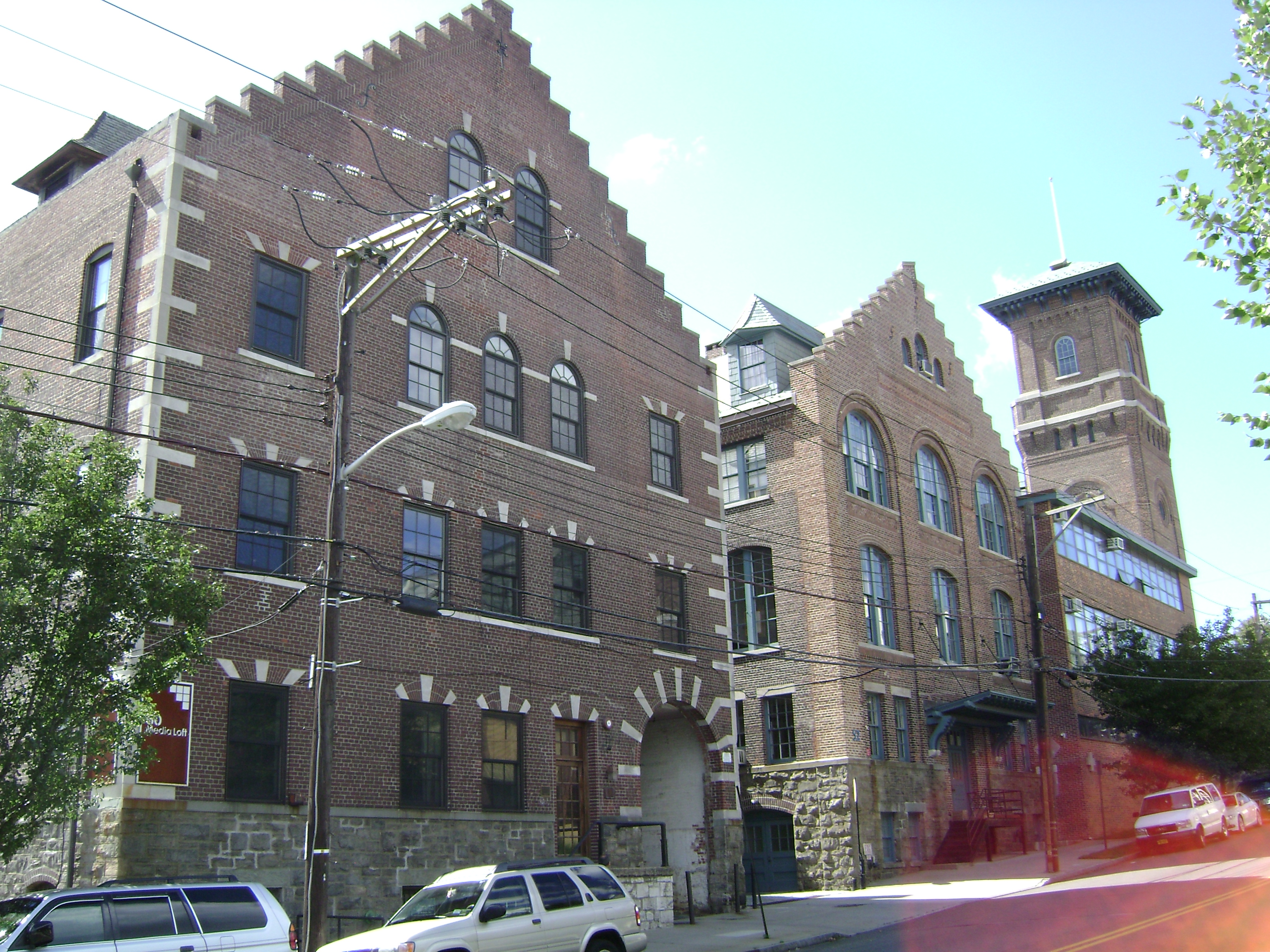

- Location within New York Location within the United States
- Location: 50-52 Webster Ave., New Rochelle, New York
- Coordinates: 40°54′22″N 73°47′23″W
- Built: 1889
- Architectural style: Dutch Colonial Revival
- NRHP reference No.: 00000487
- NYSRHP No.: 11942.000371

Significant dates
- Added to NRHP: May 11, 2000
- Designated NYSRHP: April 5, 2000

The Knickerbocker Building is an eclectic, Dutch Colonial Revivalindustrial building located at 50-52 Webster Avenue in the city of New Rochelle, Westchester County, New York.

== Description ==
The Knickerbocker Press Building is actually a connected series of large brick industrial buildings, with Dutch or Flemish stepped gables and a square four-story tower. The building has three sections, the main section sited with its eaves parallel to the street, and two smaller gable front sections connected on the east side of the main building. This structure, with its Flemish gable, arched windows and decorative brickwork, it falls into the rather rare Flemish Renaissance Revival style. There is a three-story brick International-style addition from the 1930s with steel industrial sash on the front facade, adjacent to the tower, but the rest of the exterior appears to be original. Much of its original form and detailing remain, including poly-chromatic decorative brickwork around the windows and doors, and masonry retaining walls that extend north to the railroad where they form the abutments of the Webster A venue Bridge. The words "The Knickerbocker Press" are still visible on the roof.

== History ==
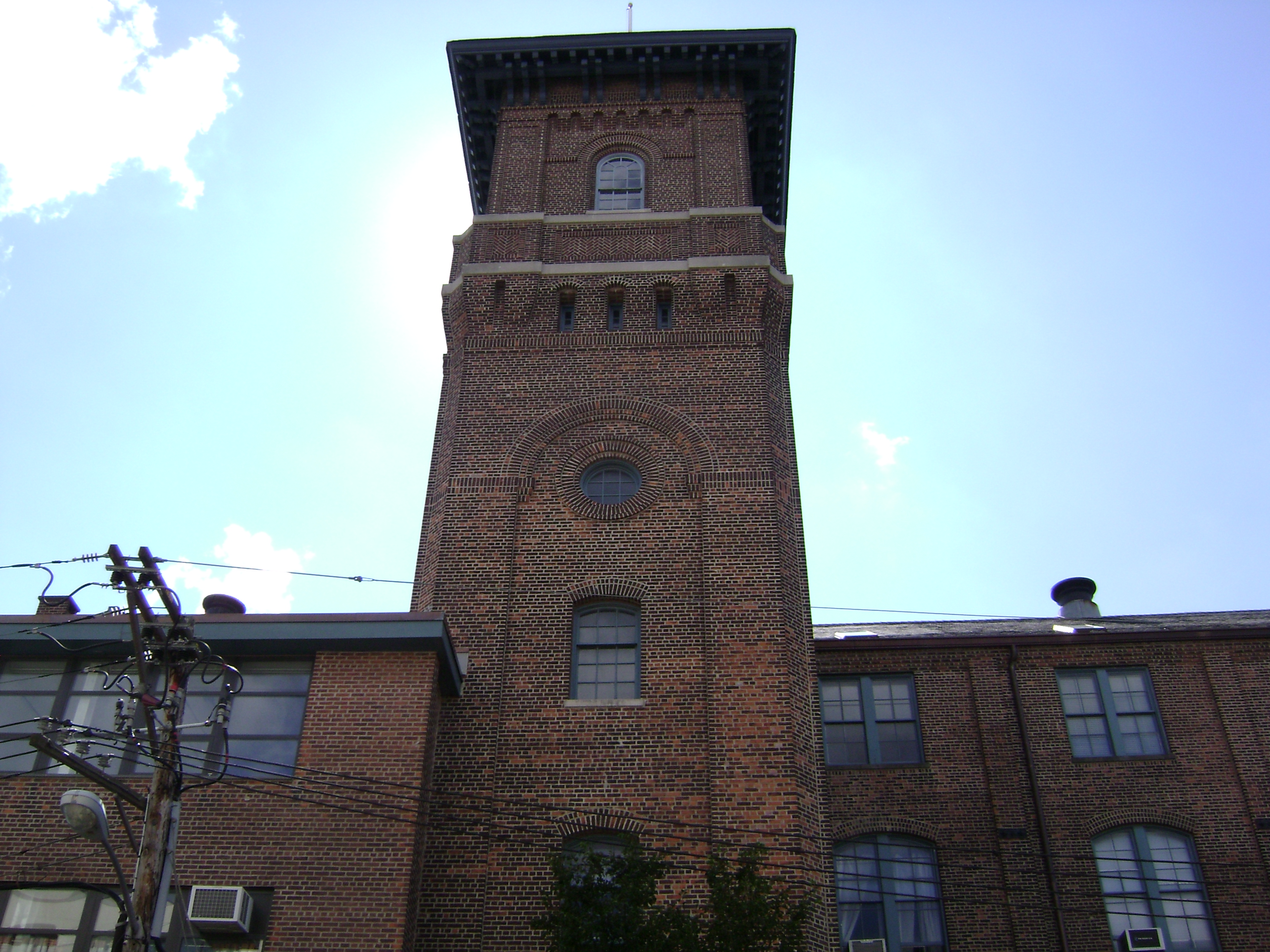

It was built in 1889 by G.P. Putnam and Sons, one of the nation's leading publishers at the time. Knickerbocker is a term often used to describe a native or inhabitant of New York, after the original Dutch settlers of the area. The Knickerbocker Press may have derived its name from the company's interest in the works of Washington Irving, originally published by G.P. Putnam, including his famous Knickerbocker's History of New York, and for which the company hoped to obtain a second term of copyrights, as the early copyrights had expired. Irving was a proponent of Dutch and Netherlandish architecture, as evidenced by his descriptions of Dutch colonial architecture in his writings, and seen at his own home, Sunnyside, in Tarrytown, New York. According to city assessor's records, the building was owned by the Knickerbocker Press until 1934, four years after George Haven Putnam's death.

After 30 years as a publishing house, American White Cross Laboratories, moved in and manufactured bandages, gauze pads, cotton balls, and related products there until 1995. Parts of the complex were used as artists' lofts during the 1980s and 1990s by artists. The building was converted into residential lofts in 2007.

The building was added to the Westchester County, New York State and National Registers of Historic Places in 2000.
