= Locust Valley, New York =

Hamlet in the United States

- Hamlet and census-designated place
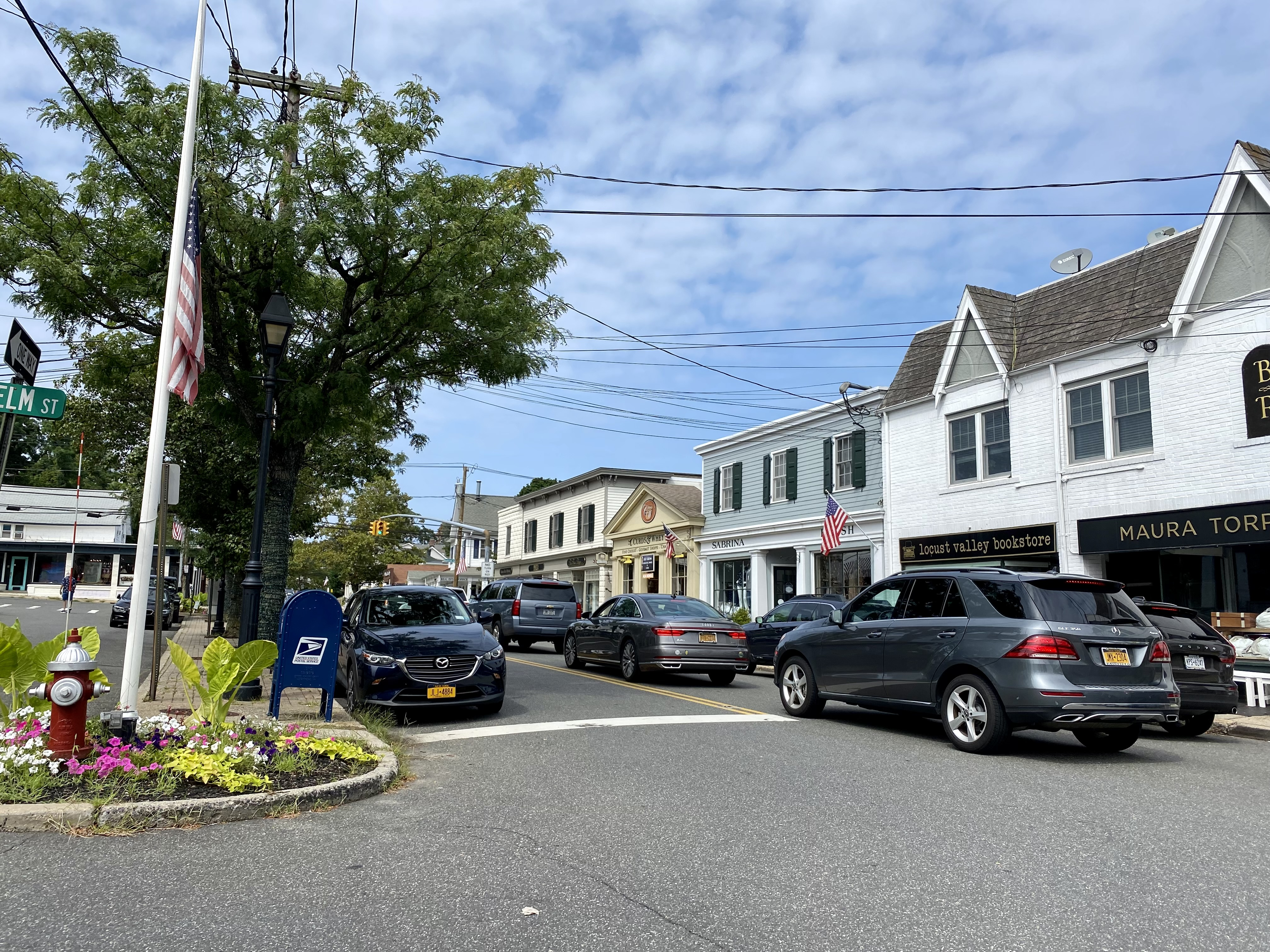
- Downtown Locust Valley on August 29, 2021
- Nickname: White Shoe
- Motto(s): Fishin' for days, mate.
- Location in Nassau County and the state of New York

- Location on Long Island Location within the state of New York
- Coordinates: 40°52′38″N 73°35′41″W
- Country: United States
- State: New York
- County: Nassau
- Town: Oyster Bay

Area
  - Total: 0.93 sq mi (2.40 km^{2})
  - Land: 0.91 sq mi (2.35 km^{2})
  - Water: 0.019 sq mi (0.05 km^{2})
- Elevation: 128 ft (39 m)

Population (2020)
  - Total: 3,571
  - Density: 3,940.3/sq mi (1,521.36/km^{2})
- Time zone: UTC-5 (Eastern (EST))
  - Summer (DST): UTC-4 (EDT)
- ZIP code: 11560
- Area codes: 516, 363
- FIPS code: 36-43192
- GNIS feature ID: 0955805

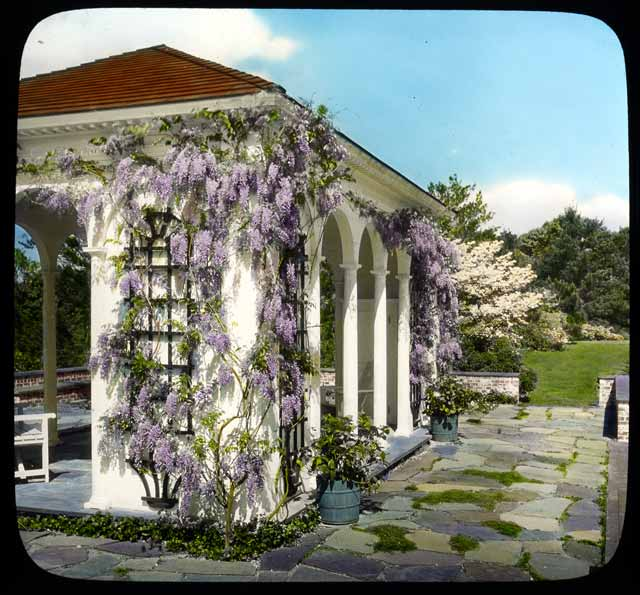
John W. Davis Garden, 1930

Locust Valley is a hamlet and census-designated place (CDP) located within the Town of Oyster Bay in Nassau County, on the North Shore of Long Island, in New York, United States. The population was 3,571 at the time of the 2020 census.

== History ==
The rolling hills of the North Shore of Long Island were laid down as terminal moraines by the receding glaciers of the last ice age roughly 10,000 years ago. The Algonquian tribe that settled the area, spanning from Flushing to Setauket, called the area "hilly ground" or Matinecock and as a result the Algonquian Indians who settled there became known as the Matinecock Indians.

In 1667, Captain John Underhill negotiated with the Matinecock Indians to purchase land for a settlement that he and his fellow colonists would call Buckram. The town name lasted for nearly 200 years, until in 1856 the name was changed to Locust Valley based on the number of locust trees located in the area.

On April 19, 1869, the Long Island Rail Road opened the extension of the Glen Cove Branch Railroad, via a single track to Locust Valley, making it the terminus of the line until the railroad was extended to its current terminus in Oyster Bay in 1889.

With the arrival of the Long Island Rail Road, a commercial center developed and thrived around the Locust Valley station and the nearby intersection of Forest Ave/Buckram Road and Birch Hill Road. As the North Shore of Long Island grew into the Gold Coast in the early 20th century, the commercial center grew to serve the great estates that were being established in the surrounding communities of Bayville, Centre Island, Lattingtown, Mill Neck, Matinecock, Muttontown and The Brookvilles.

By 1927, the wealthy Harrison Williams had established himself at his 150-acre (0.61 km^{2}) Delano & Aldrich designed estate "Oak Point" at Bayville, on nearby Pine Island. Weekend guests (which several times included Scott Fitzgerald, the Prince of Wales, Cecil Beaton or Winston Churchill) arriving at the Locust Valley Station were often fetched in one of his fleet of Rolls-Royce motorcars which would stop in the hamlet for last-moment provisions. At that time, Williams, a Wall Street tycoon, was considered the wealthiest American. In his book about the Great Depression The Great Crash 1929, John Kenneth Galbraith says of Williams' pyramiding of utilities holding companies, "If there must be madness something may be said for having it on a heroic scale".

In the 1940s and 1950s, Locust Valley was the country home of Robert A. Lovett, a partner (with Prescott Bush) in Brown Brothers Harriman Bank on Wall Street and a former United States Secretary of Defense; Elizabeth Shoumatoff, renowned portrait painter of President Franklin D. Roosevelt, and other local luminaries; and finally, Leonard Hall, The National Chairman of the Republican Party. The hamlet was also a regular stop for rest and relaxation for Edward VIII and Cole Porter.

As the commercial center, with the railroad station for the surrounding Gold Coast communities, the geographically small Locust Valley became the name of reference for all surrounding areas between Glen Cove and Oyster Bay. This larger community, which now constitutes the Locust Valley School service area, was associated with the upper-class accent prevalent on the great estates: "Locust Valley Lockjaw." While the accent is not heard as much as it once was, Locust Valley remains a social center for upper-class New Yorkers. Many are members of the exclusive clubs in the area: Piping Rock Club, The Creek, Beaver Dam and the Seawanhaka Corinthian Yacht Club.

Figures ranging from the Duke of Windsor to Franklin D. Roosevelt have spent considerable time in Locust Valley.

== Geography ==
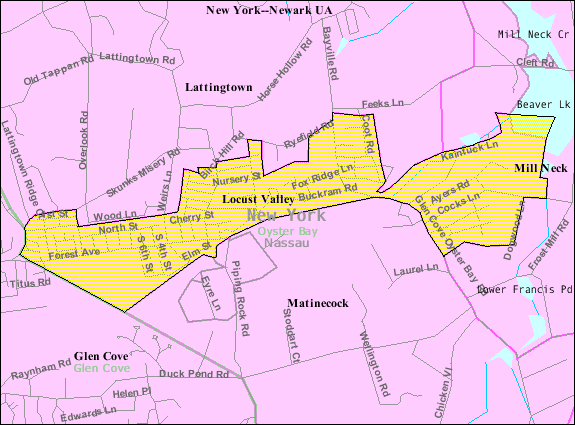
U.S. Census map of Locust Valley

According to the United States Census Bureau, the CDP has a total area of 0.9 square miles (2.3 km^{2}), of which 0.9 square miles (2.3 km^{2}) is land and 0.04 square miles (0.10 km^{2}), or 2.13%, is water.

=== Climate ===
According to the Köppen climate classification, Locust Valley has a Humid subtropical climate (type Cfa) with cool, wet winters and hot, humid summers. Precipitation is uniform throughout the year, with slight spring and fall peaks.

== Demographics ==
Historical population
| Census | Pop. | Note | %± |
|---|---|---|---|
| 2000 | 3,521 | | — |
| 2010 | 3,406 | | −3.3% |
| 2020 | 3,571 | | 4.8% |
U.S. Decennial Census

=== 2020 census ===
As of the 2020 census, Locust Valley had a population of 3,571. The median age was 41.9 years. 22.9% of residents were under the age of 18 and 15.8% of residents were 65 years of age or older. For every 100 females there were 95.2 males, and for every 100 females age 18 and over there were 91.7 males age 18 and over.

99.8% of residents lived in urban areas, while 0.2% lived in rural areas.

There were 1,268 households in Locust Valley, of which 33.7% had children under the age of 18 living in them. Of all households, 54.6% were married-couple households, 14.4% were households with a male householder and no spouse or partner present, and 26.2% were households with a female householder and no spouse or partner present. About 22.5% of all households were made up of individuals and 11.5% had someone living alone who was 65 years of age or older.

There were 1,339 housing units, of which 5.3% were vacant. The homeowner vacancy rate was 1.1% and the rental vacancy rate was 6.0%.

Racial composition as of the 2020 census
| Race | Number | Percent |
|---|---|---|
| White | 2,523 | 70.7% |
| Black or African American | 94 | 2.6% |
| American Indian and Alaska Native | 2 | 0.1% |
| Asian | 125 | 3.5% |
| Native Hawaiian and Other Pacific Islander | 0 | 0.0% |
| Some other race | 458 | 12.8% |
| Two or more races | 369 | 10.3% |
| Hispanic or Latino (of any race) | 861 | 24.1% |

=== 2000 census ===
As of the census of 2000, there were 3,521 people, 1,279 households, and 915 families residing in the CDP. The population density was 3,832.0 inhabitants per square mile (1,479.5/km^{2}). There were 1,324 housing units at an average density of 1,441.0 per square mile (556.4/km^{2}). The racial makeup of the CDP was 86.51% White, 3.89% African American, 0.03% Native American, 1.99% Asian, 0.03% Pacific Islander, 5.68% from other races, and 1.87% from two or more races. Hispanic or Latino of any race were 14.54% of the population.

There were 1,279 households, out of which 33.4% had children under the age of 18 living with them, 56.1% were married couples living together, 11.2% had a female householder with no husband present, and 28.4% were non-families. 22.6% of all households were made up of individuals, and 10.1% had someone living alone who was 65 years of age or older. The average household size was 2.75 and the average family size was 3.19.

In the CDP, the population was spread out, with 23.8% under the age of 18, 6.4% from 18 to 24, 32.2% from 25 to 44, 23.5% from 45 to 64, and 14.1% who were 65 years of age or older. The median age was 38 years. For every 100 females, there were 95.3 males. For every 100 females age 18 and over, there were 92.5 males.

The median income for a household in the CDP was $57,418, and the median income for a family was $70,592. Males had a median income of $51,115 versus $37,868 for females. The per capita income for the CDP was $40,141. About 3.0% of families and 6.4% of the population were below the poverty line, including 7.2% of those under age 18 and 2.7% of those age 65 or over.

== Education ==
The Locust Valley Central School District is a K–12 public system which serves a large geographic area covering the Incorporated Villages of Lattingtown, Matinecock, Bayville, portions of Mill Neck, Muttontown, and Brookville, along with unincorporated Locust Valley. There are four school campuses which include Ann MacArthur Primary, Locust Valley Intermediate, Bayville Primary & Intermediate, and a shared Middle–High School in Lattingtown.

In May 2012, three major national publications, Newsweek, The Washington Post, and U.S. News & World Report, ranked the high schools in the United States. All of these identified Locust Valley High School as being one of the best high schools in the country. The rankings are as follows: Newsweek ranked Locust Valley High School #2 on Long Island; #6 in New York State; and #55 in the nation. US News & World Report ranked Locust Valley High School #4 on Long Island; #20 in New York State; and #99 in the United States. The Washington Post ranked Locust Valley High School #5 on Long Island; #11 in New York State; and #144 in the United States.

Each publication uses different criteria in the selection process. The following are many of the college-readiness indicators that are used: graduation rates, college acceptance rates, the number of International Baccalaureate (IB) and Advanced Placement (AP) tests taken per student, the average score on IB and AP tests; student achievement levels; SAT scores; and State assessments.

In 2004, LVCSD began offering the International Baccalaureate Diploma Programme (IB). In 2006, it had the first graduating class with IB Diploma recipients. In 2008, after an extensive national search the District appointed its current Superintendent Dr. Anna Hunderfund beginning July 1. Based on reported 2009-2010 IB/AP test participation data, Locust Valley High School is ranked 55th nationally, 10th in the northeast, and second on Long Island (behind Jericho) Newsweek Magazine May 2012. This ranking being out of some 27,000 public high schools nationally.

In 2011, John Benstock, a music teacher with the Locust Valley School District since 2000, was arrested and in 2013 he pled guilty to inappropriate contact with students at two Locust Valley elementary schools, after being charged with four counts of sex abuse and 10 counts of endangerment. The School District sued Benstock under a "faithless servant" theory, to claw back all compensation Benstock had earned during the period of time in which he allegedly engaged in criminal conduct.

The high school newspaper The Spectrum has won the Columbia Scholastic Press Association's and the Empire State Scholastic Press Association's Gold Award for excellence in student journalism. Each year the school awards the Patrick J. Goostrey Award to the graduating senior most outstanding in American history and student leadership.

The school's colors are Hunter (Dartmouth) Green and White. The school crest includes a falcon, as the athletic teams are known as The Falcons.

== Landmarks ==
The Locust Valley Cemetery is a private, non-denominational memorial designed by the Olmsted Brothers and incorporated in 1917.

The Cock-Cornelius House, Matinecock Friends Meetinghouse, and George Underhill House are listed on the National Register of Historic Places.

== Notable people ==
- Frank Brickowski
- Irving Brokaw
- William Robertson Coe
- Paul Drennan Cravath
- John W. Davis
- F. Trubee Davison
- Henry P. Davison
- Frank Nelson Doubleday
- Marjory Gengler
- Steven Hoffenberg
- Ray Johnson
- H. H. Kung
- Robert A. Lovett
- Douglas A. Warner III
- Soong Meiling (Madame Chiang)

== See also ==
- List of Census-designated places in New York
- Oyster Bay (hamlet), New York
