= United States Deputy Secretary of State =

Deputy head of the US Department of State

- Seal of the Department of State

- Flag of the deputy secretary of state

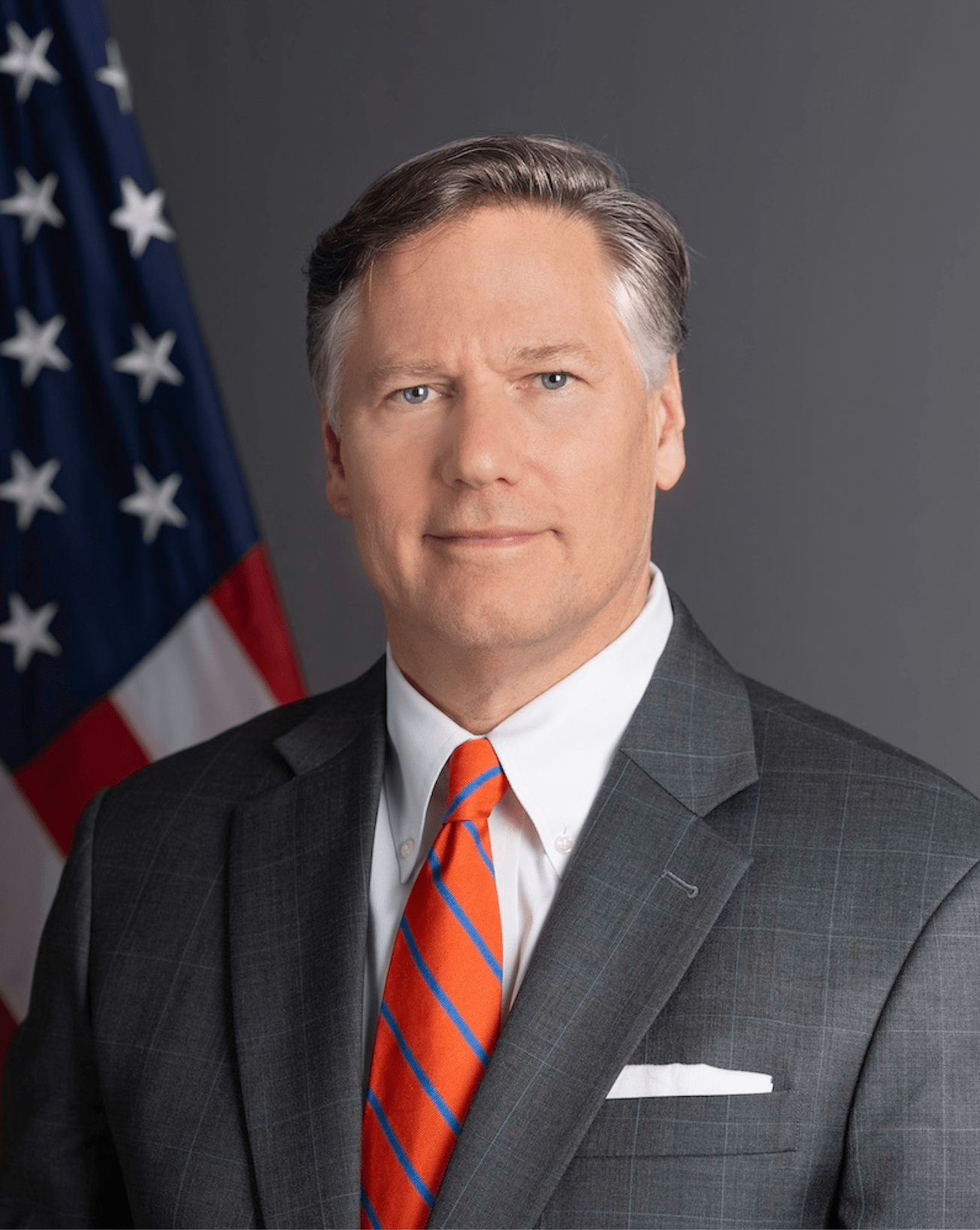
- Incumbent; Christopher Landau since March 25, 2025
- Department of State
- Reports to: U.S. Secretary of State
- Seat: Washington, D.C.
- Appointer: The president; with Senate advice and consent
- Term length: No fixed term
- Formation: July 13, 1972
- First holder: John N. Irwin II
- Salary: Executive Schedule, Level 2
- Website: Official website

The deputy secretary of state of the United States is the principal deputy to the secretary of state. If the secretary of state resigns or dies, the deputy secretary of state becomes acting secretary of state until the president nominates and the Senate confirms a replacement. The position was created in 1972. Prior to July 13, 1972, the under secretary of state had been the second ranking officer of the Department of State.

The State Department is the only federal cabinet-level agency to have two co-equal deputy secretaries. The second deputy secretary of state, the deputy secretary of state for management and resources, serves as the "first assistant" for the purposes of the Vacancies Reform Act, but both deputy secretaries have full delegated authority to act for the secretary, if not otherwise prohibited by law.

Certain deputy secretaries of state went on to become appointed as the secretary of state, such as Lawrence Eagleburger in 1992, Warren Christopher in 1993, and Antony Blinken in 2021.

== List of under secretaries of state (until 1972) ==
- 1919–1920: Frank Polk
- 1920–1921: Norman Davis
- 1921–1922: Henry P. Fletcher
- 1922–1924: William Phillips (first stint)
- 1924–1927: Joseph Grew (first stint)
- 1927–1928: Robert E. Olds
- 1928–1929: J. Reuben Clark
- 1929–1931: Joseph P. Cotton
- 1931–1933: William R. Castle Jr.
- 1933–1936: William Phillips (second stint)
- 1937–1943: Sumner Welles
- 1943–1944: Edward Stettinius Jr.
- 1944–1945: Joseph Grew (second stint)
- 1945–1947: Dean Acheson
- 1947–1949: Robert A. Lovett
- 1949–1952: James E. Webb
- 1952–1953: David K. E. Bruce
- 1953–1954: Walter Bedell Smith
- 1954–1957: Herbert Hoover Jr.
- 1957–1959: Christian Herter
- 1959–1961: C. Douglas Dillon
- 1961: Chester Bowles
- 1961–1966: George Ball
- 1966–1969: Nicholas Katzenbach
- 1969–1970: Elliot Richardson
- 1970–1972: John N. Irwin II

== List of deputy secretaries of state ==
#	Portrait	Name	Term began	Term ended	President(s) served under
1		John N. Irwin II	July 13, 1972	February 1, 1973	Richard Nixon
2		Kenneth Rush	February 2, 1973	May 29, 1974	Richard Nixon
3		Robert S. Ingersoll	July 10, 1974	March 31, 1976	Richard Nixon
3		Robert S. Ingersoll	July 10, 1974	March 31, 1976	Gerald Ford
4		Charles W. Robinson	April 9, 1976	January 20, 1977	Gerald Ford
5		Warren Christopher	February 26, 1977	January 16, 1981	Jimmy Carter
6		William P. Clark Jr.	February 25, 1981	February 9, 1982	Ronald Reagan
7		Walter J. Stoessel Jr.	February 11, 1982	September 22, 1982	Ronald Reagan
8		Kenneth W. Dam	September 23, 1982	June 15, 1985	Ronald Reagan
9		John C. Whitehead	July 9, 1985	January 20, 1989	Ronald Reagan
10		Lawrence Eagleburger	January 20, 1989	December 8, 1992	George H. W. Bush
11		Clifton R. Wharton Jr.	January 27, 1993	November 8, 1993	Bill Clinton
12		Strobe Talbott	February 22, 1994	January 19, 2001	Bill Clinton
13		Richard Armitage	March 26, 2001	February 22, 2005	George W. Bush
14		Robert Zoellick	February 22, 2005	July 7, 2006	George W. Bush
15		John Negroponte	February 27, 2007	January 28, 2009	George W. Bush
16		James Steinberg	January 28, 2009	July 28, 2011	Barack Obama
17		William J. Burns	July 28, 2011	November 3, 2014	Barack Obama
–		Wendy Sherman; Acting	November 3, 2014	January 9, 2015	Barack Obama
18		Antony Blinken	January 9, 2015	January 20, 2017	Barack Obama
–		Thomas A. Shannon Jr. Acting	February 1, 2017	May 24, 2017	Donald Trump
19		John J. Sullivan	May 24, 2017	December 20, 2019	Donald Trump
20		Stephen Biegun	December 21, 2019	January 20, 2021	Donald Trump
–		Daniel Bennett Smith; Acting	January 26, 2021	April 14, 2021	Joe Biden
21		Wendy Sherman	April 14, 2021	July 28, 2023	Joe Biden
–		Victoria Nuland; Acting	July 29, 2023	February 12, 2024	Joe Biden
22		Kurt M. Campbell	February 12, 2024	January 20, 2025	Joe Biden
23		Christopher Landau	March 25, 2025	Incumbent	Donald Trump
