= Joseph Grew =

American diplomat (1880–1965)

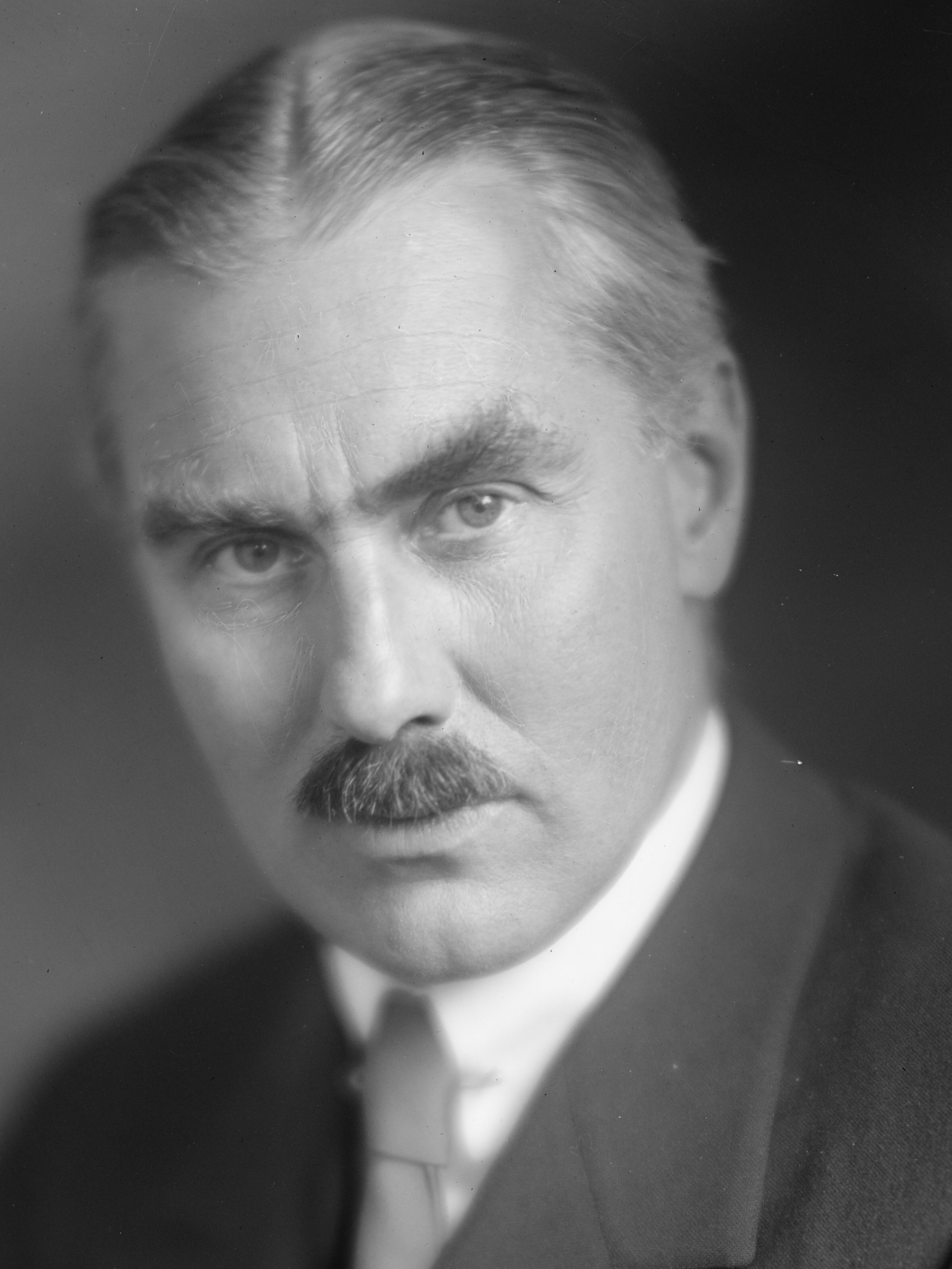
- Grew, 1905–1945

5th and 13th United States Under Secretary of State
- In office December 20, 1944 – August 15, 1945
- President: Franklin D. Roosevelt; Harry S. Truman
- Preceded by: Edward Stettinius Jr.
- Succeeded by: Dean Acheson
- In office April 16, 1924 – June 30, 1927
- President: Calvin Coolidge
- Preceded by: William Phillips
- Succeeded by: Robert E. Olds

Acting United States Secretary of State
- In office June 28, 1945 – July 3, 1945
- President: Harry S. Truman
- Preceded by: Edward Stettinius Jr.
- Succeeded by: James F. Byrnes

13th United States Ambassador to Japan
- In office June 14, 1932 – December 8, 1941
- President: Herbert Hoover; Franklin D. Roosevelt
- Preceded by: W. Cameron Forbes
- Succeeded by: William J. Sebald (ad interim)

6th United States Ambassador to Turkey
- In office October 12, 1927 – March 13, 1932
- President: Calvin Coolidge; Herbert Hoover
- Preceded by: Abram I. Elkus (Ottoman Empire)
- Succeeded by: Charles H. Sherrill

26th United States Ambassador to Switzerland
- In office September 24, 1921 – March 22, 1924
- President: Warren G. Harding; Calvin Coolidge
- Preceded by: Hampson Gary
- Succeeded by: Hugh S. Gibson

32nd United States Ambassador to Denmark
- In office April 7, 1920 – October 14, 1921
- President: Woodrow Wilson; Warren G. Harding
- Preceded by: Norman Hapgood
- Succeeded by: John Dyneley Prince

Personal details
- Born: Joseph Clark Grew; May 27, 1880 Boston, Massachusetts, U.S.
- Died: May 25, 1965 (aged 84)
- Spouse: Alice (Perry) Grew
- Children: Lilla Cabot Grew
- Education: Harvard University

Joseph Clark Grew (May 27, 1880 – May 25, 1965) was an American career diplomat and Foreign Service officer. He is best known for his long tenure as United States Ambassador to Japan (1932–1941) in the lead-up to Pearl Harbor and for his two stints as the second-in-command at the State Department (1924–1927 & 1944–45). He opposed American hardliners and sought to avoid war. When the war ended, he helped draft the U.S. Initial Post-Surrender Policy for Japan, which offered relatively generous terms to the defeated Japanese (including the retention of the Japanese monarchy), which facilitated America's peaceful post-war occupation of Japan.

After graduating from Harvard College, Grew worked his way up the diplomatic hierarchy. After World War I, he served on the American negotiating team at the Paris Peace Conference and received his first top-level posts, serving as Envoy to Denmark (1920–1921) and Switzerland (1921–1924). During his time in Switzerland, he was America's senior representative at the Lausanne peace talks. He was generally unable to implement his realist agenda in the face of broad idealist opposition. He focused on securing American interests in postwar Turkey, and failed to protect Armenian independence, although there were practical barriers to the idea. In 1924, he was promoted to Under Secretary of State, where he served as second-in-command to Charles Evans Hughes and Frank B. Kellogg and oversaw the establishment of the Foreign Service, with merit-based hiring, promotion, and salaries for white bureaucrats. After falling out with Kellogg, he was reassigned to Turkey, where he became America's first ambassador to the post-Ottoman state (1927–1932).

Grew became Ambassador to Japan at a time when tensions between the two Pacific powers were rising dramatically. He recommended negotiating with Tokyo to avoid war. However, he was unable to prevent the Japanese attack on Pearl Harbor. He returned to Washington to advise on Asian affairs. In the final months of World War II, he was reappointed Under Secretary of State under Edward Stettinius Jr., making him a high-level veteran of both Republican and Democratic administrations. Grew conciliated the defeated Japan and distrusted the victorious Soviet Union, presaging the diplomatic shift of the Cold War. However, he retired from the State Department on V-J Day in 1945, leaving the Cold War to a new generation of diplomats, including Dean Acheson, who frequently disagreed with him but eventually implemented his Japan policy.

In his retirement, Grew remained active in the foreign policy field. He chaired the National Committee for a Free Europe, the driving force behind Radio Free Europe, and the Committee of One Million, a pressure group to support Chiang Kai-shek's government in exile. Due to Grew's hawkish China policy and rivalry with Acheson, Joseph McCarthy cited Grew as an example of an anti-communist martyr. However, Grew resisted the label and publicly defended several McCarthy targets, including the diplomatic corps. When he died, The New York Times remembered him as "the father of the career [foreign] service."

== Early life ==
Grew was born in Boston, Massachusetts, in May 1880 to a wealthy Yankee family. During his youth, Grew enjoyed the outdoors, sailing, camping, and hunting during his summers away from school.

Grew attended Groton School, where one of his classmates was Franklin D. Roosevelt. He went on to Harvard College and graduated in 1902. At Harvard, Grew and Roosevelt worked together at The Harvard Crimson. Although Grew's future rival Dean Acheson also attended Groton, the two did not overlap, as Grew was thirteen years older than Acheson.

== Career ==
After his graduation, Grew set out on a Grand Tour, during which he nearly died of malaria. While recovering in India, he became friends with an American consul there. That inspired him to abandon his plan of following in his father's career as a banker, and he decided to go into diplomatic service. In the days before merit-based hiring, diplomatic jobs could be won through personal connections. After hearing news that Grew had shot a tiger in China (and after receiving a recommendation from Alford Cooley), Theodore Roosevelt insisted that Grew receive a diplomatic post.

Grew obtained his first State Department job in 1904, as a consulate clerk in Khedivate-era Cairo. He then rotated through diplomatic missions in Mexico City (1906), St. Petersburg (1907), Berlin (1908), Vienna (1911), Berlin (1912–1914), and Vienna (1914–1917). In a strange coincidence, he was the First Secretary at the Berlin Embassy when World War I broke out, and the chargé d'affaires in Vienna when the United States entered the war. During the war, he served as acting chief of the Division of Western European Affairs (1917–1919).

=== Post-World War I negotiator ===
Grew served as the secretary of the American peace commission in Paris (1919–1920). A committed and "thoroughly indiscreet" (in his own words) diarist, Grew published his account of the post-war negotiations in 1952. He outlined what was later described as a "paralyzing lack of initiative" from the American negotiators, who failed to restrain President Wilson and the rest of the Big Four.

After Grew's promotion to ambassador, he was seconded as an American observer at the Conference of Lausanne, with Richard Child. America did not participate directly at Lausanne because the Ottoman Empire and the United States had not declared war on each other. To stabilize U.S.-Turkey relations, Grew negotiated a side treaty with İsmet İnönü (then referred to as İsmet Pasha). The treaty would have abolished extraterritoriality and tax exemptions for American citizens (see Capitulations of the Ottoman Empire), in exchange for equal rights for American charities and nonprofits. (A side deal to the side deal, the Chester concession, would have authorized new U.S. oil and railroad investments in Turkey; Standard Oil of New York already had substantial interests in Turkey.) He recalled that İsmet felt no need to compromise because he knew that following the Turkish War of Independence, the Allies had no appetite to impose terms by force.

Grew also attended the main Lausanne negotiations. Unlike Harold Nicolson's traditional narrative, Grew—who was broadly sympathetic to the new Turkish republic—harshly criticized British negotiator Lord Curzon. He recalled that Curzon ridiculed the Turkish and Soviet negotiators to their faces, and that while he was "always courteous, always entertaining" in private, his impatience and highhandedness as a negotiator intensified Turkish resistance to the Allied demands. Grew's position was complicated by American interests in Turkey, as the Turks feared being geographically dismembered after the war (cf. Hungary) and looked to America for support. At one point the Turks attempted to forestall a European takeover of Turkey by offering to make Anatolia an American protectorate under a League of Nations mandate. After the Chester concession became public in April 1923, the European powers suspected that Turkey had paid off the Americans to take Turkey's side at Lausanne. Curzon asked the Americans to leave, and Grew's assistants were sent back home, although Grew was eventually called on to mediate a dispute between Turkey and Greece on war reparations.

The U.S.-Turkey treaty was submitted to the United States Senate in 1924, where it was met with intense opposition, including from the opposition Democratic Party, which promised to reject the treaty during the 1924 presidential election. Although the Democrats lost the election, the Senate ultimately delayed consideration of the U.S.-Turkey treaty until 1927. Grew attributed the opposition to the Armenian American lobby, which refused to compromise on an independent Armenian state. The Armenian genocide had just taken place, and the Bolsheviks had already conquered the formerly Russian-controlled areas of the Armenian Highlands. The European powers had indicated an interest in carving out an independent Armenia from Turkish territory under an American League of Nations mandate (although they would not consent to the Turks' proposed Anatolian mandate). President Wilson was open to the idea, but General James G. Harbord, an American military investigator, did not think America could properly defend remote Armenia without a presence in Anatolia, and Admiral Mark Lambert Bristol, the American representative in Turkey (there was no ambassador as the two nations had severed formal diplomatic relations during the war), felt there were too few Armenians left in the area to populate an independent nation. Ultimately, no Armenian state was carved out of Turkish territory. Armenia did not gain independence until 1991, after the fall of the Soviet Union.

=== Envoy to Denmark and Switzerland ===
From April 7, 1920 to October 14, 1921, Grew served as the U.S. Envoy to Denmark (effectively equivalent to ambassador; until 1961, ambassadors represented only one Great Power in front of another Great Power, see Diplomatic rank) after his appointment by President Woodrow Wilson. He was preceded by Norman Hapgood and succeeded by John Dyneley Prince.

From September 24, 1921 to March 22, 1924, he served as the U.S. Envoy to Switzerland after his appointment by President Warren Harding. He was preceded by Hampson Gary and succeeded by Hugh S. Gibson.

=== First stint as Under Secretary of State (1924–1927) ===
From April 16, 1924 to June 30, 1927, Grew served as the Under Secretary of State (the pre-1972 equivalent of Deputy Secretary of State) under President Calvin Coolidge. During this period, Grew also served as chairman of the Foreign Service Personnel Board.

Grew generally supported the professionalization and depoliticization of the State Department civil service. He was a Republican who spent much of his early career worried that Democrats would fire him for political reasons, and relied heavily on his personal friendships with high-ranking Democrats like Franklin Roosevelt. He also recognized that the State Department's low salaries meant that only the sons of rich men wanted to work there. (Note: Reportedly, the State Department's basis for favoring the wealthy was that European diplomats also tended to be wealthy, and a working-class candidate would "not have the tone or resources to keep up with the nobility they would have to deal with overseas.") From 1914 to 1922, three-quarters of incoming embassy secretaries had attended eastern prep schools, "mainly [Grew's alma mater] Groton and St. Paul's." In 1921, Grew wrote that under the current system, “the first quality demanded of [aspiring diplomats] is a wealthy father, or a personal income,” and that many sons of rich men were joining the diplomatic corps for social cachet. (Note: John Kenneth Galbraith suggested that prep school boys "were attracted to the State Department because manner there was as important as knowledge and more easily acquired and because it was the one government department where a true-blue gentleman could work. No Groton man could serve in the General Accounting Office, the Bureau of Labor Statistics or the Department of Agriculture.") He urged the State Department to draw in more talented public servants by raising salaries.

One month after Grew became Under Secretary, the Rogers Act created a merit-based hiring process. Grew implemented the Act at the State Department; The New York Times later called him "the father of the career service." Grew would joke to incoming Foreign Service candidates that "All you have to do to get into the Foreign Service is to answer a few questions. I had to shoot a tiger." Even so, he sought to make sure that the State Department kept its reputation for gentility. He wanted "the new recruits, whatever their background, [to] ... adopt the values of the old club," prompting Felix Frankfurter to quip that the new crop of Foreign Service officers were "more Grotty than the men who actually went to Groton."

Grew's tenure as Under Secretary was met with controversy both during and after his time in office. He was forced out after three years amidst accusations that the Personnel Board was favoring a “Harvard clique.” In addition, scholars later called attention to his racially exclusionary hiring practices. In 1924, the turn to merit-based hiring had allowed Clifton Reginald Wharton Sr. to become the first Black member of the Foreign Service. Grew used his position to manipulate the oral part of the exam specifically to prevent further hiring of Black candidates. Grew left after three years, but his successors continued the policy. After Wharton, no other Black person was hired to join the Foreign Service for more than 20 years.

=== Ambassador to Turkey ===
External videos
- Atatürk speaking French with Joseph Grew

In 1927, President Coolidge indicated his desire to revive the Turkey question. Grew's 1923 treaty was resubmitted to the Senate, which ultimately rejected the treaty by a 50-34 vote, six votes short of the required two-thirds majority. Over continuing Armenian-American opposition, President Coolidge decided to normalize diplomatic relations with the new Republic of Turkey even without a treaty.

Coolidge appointed Grew as the first American ambassador to the Republic. Grew served in Istanbul, as the new capital Ankara was "little more than an undeveloped provincial town" at the time. During this period, Grew established a good rapport with Atatürk and expressed pride in Turkey's democratic development.

=== Ambassador to Japan ===
In 1932, Grew was appointed by President Herbert Hoover to succeed William Cameron Forbes as the Ambassador to Japan, where he took up his posting on June 6. Ambassador and Mrs. Grew had been happy in Turkey, and were hesitant about the move, but decided that Grew would have a unique opportunity to make the difference between peace and war between the United States and Japan.

==== Attempts to defuse tensions ====
Grew did not speak Japanese, which limited his performance somewhat. Even so, the Grews soon became popular in Japanese society, joining clubs and societies there, and adapting to the culture, even as relations between the two countries deteriorated. During his long tenure in Japan he became well known to the American public, making regular appearances in newspapers, newsreels and magazines, including an appearance on Time magazine's cover in 1934, and a long 1940 feature story in Life in which writer John Hersey, later famous for Hiroshima, called Grew "unquestionably the most important U.S. ambassador" and Tokyo the "most important embassy ever given a U.S. career diplomat."

One major episode came on 12 December 1937. During the USS Panay incident, the Japanese military bombed and sank the American gunboat Panay while it was anchored in the Yangtze River outside Nanking in China. Three American sailors were killed. Japan and the United States were at peace. The Japanese claimed that they had not seen the American flags painted on the deck of the gunboat and then apologized and paid an indemnity. Nevertheless, the attack outraged Americans and caused US opinion to turn against the Japanese.

One of Grew's closest and most influential Japanese friends and allies was Prince Tokugawa Iesato (1863–1940), the president of Japan's upper house, the House of Peers. During most of the 1930s, both men worked together in various creative diplomatic ways to promote goodwill between their nations. The adjoining photograph showed them having tea together in 1937 after attending a goodwill event to commemorate the 25th anniversary Japanese gift of cherry blossom trees to the US in 1912. The Garden Club of America reciprocated by giving flowering trees to Japan.

The historian Jonathan Utley argues in Before Pearl Harbor that Grew took the position that Japan had legitimate economic and security interests in Greater East Asia and that he hoped that President Roosevelt and Secretary of State Hull would accommodate them by high-level negotiations. However, Roosevelt, Hull, and other top American officials strongly opposed the massive Japanese intervention in China, and they negotiated with China to send American warplanes and with Britain and the Netherlands to cut off sales of steel and oil, which Japan needed for aggressive warfare. Other historians argue that Grew put far too much trust in the power of his moderate friends in the Japanese government. After Japan attacked the United States, Grew speculated that hardliners in the Japanese government had doctored the Hull Note to persuade civilian leadership that war was inevitable. Shigeru Yoshida's 1955 memoirs corroborated this theory.

Grew wrote in 1942 that he expected Nazi Germany to collapse, like the German Empire in 1918, but not the Japanese Empire:

I know Japan; I lived there for ten years. I know the Japanese intimately. The Japanese will not crack. They will not crack morally or psychologically or economically, even when eventual defeat stares them in the face. They will pull in their belts another notch, reduce their rations from a bowl to a half bowl of rice, and fight to the bitter end. Only by utter physical destruction or utter exhaustion of their men and materials can they be defeated.

==== Attack on Pearl Harbor, internment, and repatriation ====
According to Dean Acheson, Grew questioned "the prevailing opinion" that Japan would not start a war by attacking Pearl Harbor. On January 27, 1941, Grew secretly cabled the State Department with rumors passed on by the Peruvian Minister to Japan: "Japan military forces planned a surprise mass attack at Pearl Harbor in case of 'trouble' with the United States." Grew's own published account of 1944 stated, "There is a lot of talk around town [Tokyo] to the effect that the Japanese in case of a break with the United States, are planning to go all out in a surprise mass attack on Pearl Harbor." Grew's report was provided to Admiral Harold R. Stark, Chief of Naval Operations, and Admiral Husband Kimmel, Commander-in-chief of the U.S. Pacific Fleet, but it was discounted by everyone involved in Washington, D.C., and Hawaii. Grew warned of an impending attack again in a November 3, 1941 telegram, one month before the war began.

Grew served as ambassador until December 8, 1941, when the United States and Japan severed diplomatic relations during the Japanese bombing of Pearl Harbor. After the attack, all Allied diplomats in Japanese territory, including Grew, were interned. On April 18, 1942, Grew watched US B-25 bombers carry out the Doolittle Raid, bombing Tokyo and other cities after taking off from aircraft carriers in the Pacific. When he realized that the low-flying planes over Tokyo were American, not Japanese planes on maneuvers, he thought they may have flown from the Aleutian Islands, as they appeared too large to be from a carrier. Grew wrote in his memoirs that embassy staff were "very happy and proud."

In accordance with diplomatic treaties, the US and Japan negotiated the repatriation of their diplomats via neutral territory. In July 1942, Grew and 1,450 other American and foreign citizens went via steamship from Tokyo to Lourenço Marques in Portuguese East Africa aboard the Japanese liner Asama Maru and her backup, the Italian liner Conte Verde. In exchange, the US sent home the Japanese diplomats, along with 1,096 other Japanese citizens.

=== Re-appointment as Under Secretary of State (1944–1945) ===
Grew returned to Washington in 1942 and served as a special assistant to Secretary Hull. In 1944, he was promoted to director of the Division of Far Eastern Affairs. On December 20, 1944, Grew was once again appointed as Under Secretary of State. He served as the Acting Secretary of State for most of the period from January to August 1945, while Secretaries of State Edward Stettinius and James F. Byrnes were away at conferences.

==== The start of the Cold War ====
Grew distrusted the Soviet Union and advocated an anti-communist stance in the final days of the war. In April 1945, he and Chip Bohlen organized a meeting for State Department leadership, where Averell Harriman informed his colleagues that America and the USSR had a "basic and irreconcilable difference of objective" and that appeasement was not feasible. According to Harry Truman, Grew wanted the U.S. Army to continue pushing into Central Europe towards the end of the war, and hoped to rescue Czechoslovakia from the postwar Soviet orbit.

However, Dean Acheson complained that Grew and Leo Crowley had prematurely undermined America's allies by urging President Truman to terminate Lend-Lease, one of Acheson's favored projects, at the end of the war. After his retirement, Truman admitted that he had signed the order cutting back Lend-Lease without reading it. He said that Grew and Crowley had told him Roosevelt had approved the order before his death, and that in retrospect, he would have liked to taper off Lend-Lease more gradually. Crowley defended his decision, while Grew declined to comment.

One exception to Grew's anti-Soviet policy was his decision to repatriate Soviet nationals who had been captured by the Nazis as prisoners-of-war (POWs), and had entered American custody. During the war, the Nazis had put these individuals to work (voluntarily or involuntarily (Note: Most Soviet POWs stated that they had been given a choice by the Germans: volunteer for labor duty with the German army or be turned over to the Gestapo for execution or service in an Arbeitslager (a camp used to work prisoners until they died of starvation or illness). In any case, in Stalin's eyes, they were dead men, as they had been captured alive, "contaminated" by contact with those in bourgeois Western nations, and found in service with the German Army.)), mostly as rear area personnel (ammunition bearers, cooks, drivers, sanitation orderlies, or guards). The Soviet POWs asked the United States not to send them back to the USSR. They expected that Stalin would shoot them as traitors for allowing themselves to be captured alive; under Soviet law, surrender incurred the death penalty. When they learned that the United States was sending them home, they rioted, and some committed suicide. Truman granted the men a temporary reprieve, but Grew, as Acting Secretary of State, signed an order on July 11, 1945 sending them back. Soviet co-operation, it was believed, would prove necessary to remake the face of postwar Europe. On August 31, 1945, the 153 survivors were officially returned to the Soviet Union; their ultimate fate is unknown.

==== The atomic bomb and the Emperor ====
In 1944, before the war ended, Grew published his Japan diaries in edited form as Ten Years in Japan. In the book, he encouraged Americans to negotiate a generous peace with Japan, explaining that "there are many Japanese today who did not want war ... and who did everything in their power to restrain the military extremists from their headlong and suicidal aggressions."

Henry Stimson and Kenneth Colegrove credited Grew with convincing the American leadership to retain the Emperor of Japan. Upon returning to America, Grew went on a speaking tour to urge Americans to support retaining the Japanese monarchy. Grew believed that the Emperor would be "a potent means of restoring order and re-establishing parliamentary government," while the anti-Emperor faction, represented by Dean Acheson, argued that the "anachronistic [and] feudal" elements that made the Emperor potentially useful to the American occupation also made him "perfectly adapted to the use of anachronistic, feudal-minded groups within the country." Stimson remarked that at the time, men like Grew "were roundly abused as appeasers."

In May 1945, Grew asked President Truman to publicly announce that the Emperor would be allowed to remain as head of state if the Japanese surrendered. Truman said that Grew pushed to issue the declaration as soon as America concluded the Battle of Okinawa. By contrast, the Pentagon was unsure whether the Japanese would actually take the deal, and wanted to wait until the eve of invasion before offering to retain the emperor. Stimson, the Secretary of War, worried that the Japanese would see a concession on the Emperor as an admission of weakness. Truman considered making the offer in the Potsdam Declaration, but ultimately left it out. After the atomic bombings of Hiroshima and Nagasaki, Grew speculated that if Truman had taken his advice, there would have been no need for the atomic bombings and no need for the Soviet entry into the Pacific War.

Grew, Stimson, and John J. McCloy influenced the policy document U.S. Initial Post-Surrender Policy for Japan, which President Truman approved on September 6, 1945. Grew successfully opposed trying the imperial family for war crimes, thereby preparing the way for a speedy Japanese surrender and the friendly postwar relations during which Japan was closely supervised by American officials. Acheson eventually admitted that Grew had been right and he had been wrong.

==== Formation of the State of Israel ====
Shortly before his departure, Grew wrote President Truman three memos urging him to not throw his full support behind the State of Israel. In May 1945, he explained that while "President Roosevelt at times gave expression to views sympathetic to certain Zionist aims, he also gave certain assurances to the Arabs which they regard as definite commitments on our part," including a promise to not support any changes to the status quo "without full consultation with both Arabs and Jews." He specifically noted that Roosevelt had promised Ibn Saud that he "would not assist the Jews as against the Arabs," and warned that a State of Israel "could be established and maintained only by military force."

Grew urged Truman to hold off on a decision, explaining that "definite arrangements regarding specific territories are to be considered later" and that any resolution of the Mandatory Palestine issue should be handled "through the United Nations." Truman responded that many Holocaust survivors could not be reasonably asked to return to Europe and that "the misery [of the Jewish refugee camps] ... could not be allowed to continue."

==== Resignation controversy and McCarthy conspiracy theory ====
Grew retired on August 15, 1945, Victory over Japan Day, and was succeeded by Dean Acheson. The swap was considered surprising at the time, as Acheson had abruptly announced his retirement the previous week. The reasons for Grew's departure were unclear. It was said that he left because Harry Truman wanted to remake Japan in a more democratic and liberal fashion, and worried that Grew would let the old leadership return to power. Alternatively, it was suggested that Grew was Edward Stettinius Jr.'s man, while Acheson was James F. Byrnes' man.

Most salaciously, Joseph McCarthy and Felix Wittmer claimed that Grew had been fired because he wanted to prosecute John Service, who was accused of being a communist spy. McCarthy added that Acheson had promptly promoted Service to high posts. The Senate Foreign Relations Committee began investigating McCarthy's claims. In a 1950 interview with a committee lawyer, Grew explained that he had authorized Julius C. Holmes to arrest certain individuals associated with the Amerasia publication for potential theft of military secrets. One of these individuals ended up being Service. Grew said that he did not know that Service was a target of the investigation. Rather, before authorizing the arrests, he asked Holmes to confirm that he believed the suspects were "almost certainly" guilty; he did not ask Holmes to give him their names. Grew expressed shock that Service had been caught up in the affair and said that the man should be "reinstated to duty without any blemish on his fine record." Grew had previously congratulated Service on his "complete vindication" after Service had been cleared by a grand jury.

Amplifying the confusion, Grew had in fact butted heads with several of McCarthy's opponents. Acheson complained that Grew had attempted to freeze him out of the most desirable posts when Stettinius took over the State Department. In addition, John Carter Vincent admitted that Grew had overruled his recommendation to hire suspected Communist Owen Lattimore as a Far East consultant; Lattimore had been one of the primary opponents to Grew's Hirohito policy.

Grew eventually became a public critic of McCarthy. He clashed with McCarthy over the appointment of Chip Bohlen to the Soviet ambassadorship. In January 1954, Grew, Norman Armour, Robert Woods Bliss, William Phillips, and Howland Shaw published an open letter defending the Foreign Service from McCarthy's attacks. In response, McCarthy ally Scott McLeod accused the letter-writers of a "scandalous libel."

== Other work ==
=== Activism ===
Following Grew's retirement from the State Department, he continued supporting American rapprochement with Japan. During the Tokyo Tribunal, he submitted an affidavit in defense of Mamoru Shigemitsu. His efforts were only partially successful. Shigemitsu was acquitted of the most serious charges and served five years in prison. Grew raised funds for the International Christian University in Tokyo. With Emperor Showa's support, Grew also established the Grew-Bancroft Foundation, which funds scholarships for Japanese students to attend college in the United States.

Grew urged the United States to throw its full support behind Chiang Kai-shek when the Chinese Civil War resumed. Dismayed by Chiang's defeat and flight to Taiwan, Grew led the Committee of One Million Against the Admission of Communist China, an activist group that campaigned to bar the People's Republic of China from taking the Chinese seat in the United Nations, including its Security Council veto.

An Atlanticist, Grew encouraged the United States to integrate with European economies by joining the Organisation for European Economic Co-operation. This was done, and the OEEC was renamed to the OECD in 1961. He was also the chairman of the National Committee for a Free Europe, the driving force behind Radio Free Europe.

=== Writings ===
Grew's book Sport and Travel in the Far East was a favorite one of Theodore Roosevelt's. The introduction to the 1910 Houghton Mifflin printing of the book features the following introduction written by Roosevelt:

My dear Grew,— I was greatly interested in your book "Sport and Travel in the Far East" and I think it is a fine thing to have a member of our diplomatic service able both to do what you have done, and to write about it as well and as interestingly as you have written.... Your description, both of the actual hunting and the people and surroundings, is really excellent;...

In 1952, he published Turbulent Era, two volumes (1526 pages) of professional memoirs based on his diaries. The memoirs were hailed upon release as some of the best diplomatic autobiographies ever released to that point. Grew left his unredacted diaries to the Houghton Library at Harvard University.

== Personal life ==
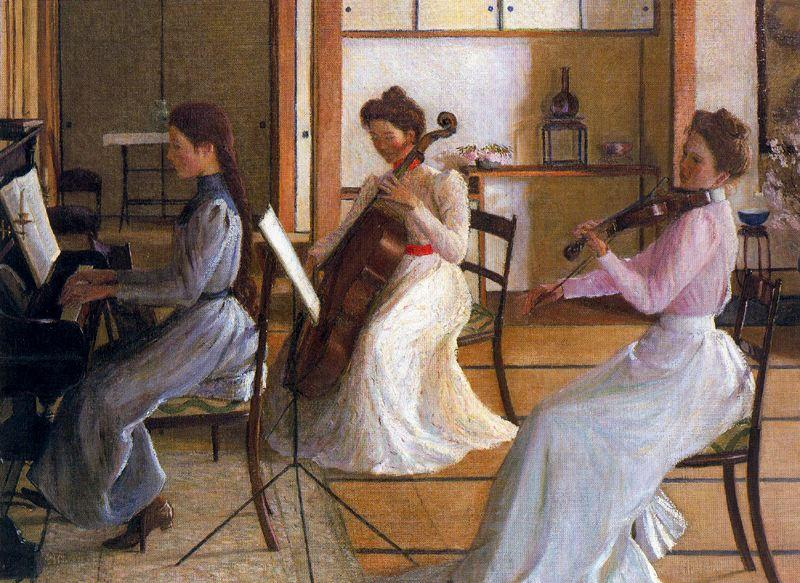
Painting of his wife and her sisters, Lilla Cabot Perry, The Trio (Alice, Edith, and, Margaret Perry) by their mother, Lilla Cabot Perry, ca. 1898–1900

Grew married Alice de Vermandois Perry (1883–1959), the daughter of premier American impressionist painter Lilla Cabot Perry (1848–1933), daughter of Dr. Samuel Cabot (of the New England Cabots). Alice's father was noted American scholar Thomas Sergeant Perry (1845–1928). Through her paternal grandfather, Alice was a great-granddaughter of famed American naval hero Oliver Hazard Perry. Together, Joseph and Alice were the parents of:

- Lilla Cabot Grew (1907–1994), who married Jay Pierrepont Moffat (1896–1943), the American Ambassador to Canada, in 1927, and later married former judge Albert Levitt, in 1956.
- Elizabeth Sturgis Grew (1912–1998), who married Cecil B. Lyon.

He died two days before his 85th birthday on May 25, 1965.

=== Descendants ===
Grew's grandson, Jay Pierrepont Moffat, Jr. (1932–2020), was the United States Ambassador to Chad from 1983 to 1985.

== In popular culture ==
In the 1970 film Tora! Tora! Tora!, a historical drama about the 1941 Japanese attack on Pearl Harbor, the part of US Ambassador Joseph Grew was played by Meredith Weatherby.

== Published works ==
- Sport and Travel in the Far East, 1910
- Report From Tokyo, 1942
- Ten Years in Japan, 1944
- Turbulent Era, Volume I, 1952
- Turbulent Era, Volume II, 1952

== Honours ==
- Grand Cordon of the Order of the Rising Sun (1960)

== See also ==
- Japan–United States relations

Diplomatic posts
Preceded by Norman Hapgood	U.S. Ambassador to Denmark; 1920–1921	Succeeded by John Dyneley Prince
Preceded by Hampson Gary	U.S. Ambassador to Switzerland; 1921–1924	Succeeded by Hugh S. Gibson
Preceded by Abram I. Elkus as Ambassador to the Ottoman Empire	U.S. Ambassador to Turkey; 1927–1932	Succeeded by Charles H. Sherrill
Preceded by W. Cameron Forbes	U.S. Ambassador to Japan; 1932–1941	Succeeded by none (World War II began)
Political offices
Preceded by William Phillips	United States Under Secretary of State; 1924–1927	Succeeded by Robert E. Olds
Preceded by Edward Stettinius Jr.	United States Under Secretary of State; 1944–1945	Succeeded by Dean Acheson
Preceded by Edward Stettinius Jr.	United States Secretary of State; Ad interim 1945	Succeeded by James F. Byrnes
