= Irving S. Olds =

American lawyer (1887–1963)

Irving S. Olds.
- Born: Irving Sands Olds; January 22, 1887; Erie, Pennsylvania, U.S.
- Died: March 4, 1963 (aged 76)
- Education: Yale University (BA, MA); Harvard University (LLB)

Irving Sands Olds (1887–1963) was an American lawyer and philanthropist. He served as chairman of the board and chief executive officer of U.S. Steel from 1940 to 1952, and was partner at White & Case.

== Early life ==
Irving Sands Olds was born in Erie, Pennsylvania, the only child of Clark and Livia Elizabeth Olds. Clark was an attorney, and Irving grew up in a wealthy household. He graduated from Erie High School in 1903. Irving attended Yale University for his undergraduate degree, and graduated with a B.A. in 1907. He then continued on to receive a law degree from Harvard in 1910. Upon his graduation, Olds took a position as a law clerk for Chief Justice of the United States Supreme Court, Oliver Wendell Holmes Jr. In 1911, he joined the law firm White & Case. In 1917, Olds became a partner, and remained as such until his death. That same year, he married Evelyn Foster, daughter of Pell William Foster (1862–1947), founder of Foster Wheeler Corporation, and Anne Williams; and, granddaughter of William Foster Jr., president of the first elevated railroad company in New York. The two did not have children.

== Career ==
In 1915, Olds was hired as counsel by J.P. Morgan & Co after World War I had broken out in Europe. In this capacity, he advised the bank's export deportment which oversaw purchases made on behalf of the British and French war effort. Following the United States' entry into the war, he served in 1918 as an assistant to Morgan partner, Edward R. Stettinius, during the latter's tenure as surveyor general of supplies for the U.S. War Department.

After a stint in France opening White & Case's Paris office after the First World War, Olds returned to the United States and became involved dealings between his firm and the United States Steel Corporation. In 1936, Olds was elected to the corporation's Board of Directors, and in 1940, upon the departure of Edward Stettinius Jr., he was made chairman and chief executive officer. He ran U.S. Steel for twelve years, through the rest of the Second World War, and into the Atomic Age.

== Personal life ==
Olds led the Council for Financial Aid to Education, an organization that directed corporation donations to universities. He spent two years as the President of the New-York Historical Society, and was a benefactor and board member of both the Metropolitan Museum of Art and Lincoln Center for the Performing Arts. He studied naval history and had published two works, about the topic, "U.S. Naval History, 1776–1815" and "Bits and Pieces of American History". He collected Revolutionary War and War of 1812 Naval Prints, and had a collection of over 1,000 items, many of which were donated upon his death to White & Case and the New-York Historical Society.

Olds's collection served as an inspiration to his wife, Evelyn Foster Olds. An amateur painter, she took the themes and images she found in Olds's prints and painted them on trays and other objects. In February 1957, Harry Shaw Newman organized an exhibition of her work at the Old Print Shop in New York. The following year, Evelyn's work was shown at the Peabody Museum and, in cooperation with the United States National Museum and the United States Marine Corps Museum, at the Smithsonian's Arts and Industries Building.

Olds died on March 4, 1963, and was interred at Woodlawn Cemetery, in the Bronx.

== Legacy ==
In 1942, the American Ship Building Company constructed the SS Irving Olds, named in honor of Olds, for the Pittsburgh Steamship Company. The ship was sold to U.S. Steel in 1952 and was eventually scrapped in 1988. On April 13, 1945, an Andromeda-class attack cargo ship, the USS Montague (AKA-98) was commissioned, sponsored by Mrs. Irving S. Olds which served for 10 years and 7 months.

His art collection and personal papers are housed at the New-York Historical Society.

== See also ==
- List of law clerks for the second seat of the Supreme Court of the United States

Business positions
Preceded by Edward Stettinius Jr.	Chairman of the Board of U.S. Steel; June 4, 1940 – January 22, 1952	Succeeded by Benjamin Fairless
