= International Registries =

Company based in Reston, Virginia, USA

International Registries, Inc. (IRI) is a company based in Reston, Virginia, United States, which operates the flag of convenience ship registry and corporate registry of the Marshall Islands on behalf of the Republic of the Marshall Islands (RMI).

The company began as "Stettinius associates-Liberia, Inc.", a company founded in 1948 by Edward Stettinius, Jr. to operate flag of convenience registry in Liberia. After a series of mergers, Stettinius associates became IRI. IRI then moved from Liberia to the Marshall Islands after Liberia's president Charles Taylor demanded too much money from the company.
