= Sport and Travel in the Far East =

1910 book by Joseph Clark Grew

Sport and Travel in the Far East is a travelogue written by American diplomat and writer Joseph Clark Grew. Published in 1910, it chronicles Grew's experiences during his time as a diplomat in East Asia. The book offers recounts of his hunting expeditions, observations of local customs, and reflections on British India, Qing China, Imperial Japan, the Dominion of New Zealand and Japanese Korea. Grew engages with both the natural world and the people he encounters, providing readers with insights into the early 20th century Far East. Former U.S. President Theodore Roosevelt, an avid hunter, sportsman and wayfarer himself, wrote the foreword for the book, praising it.

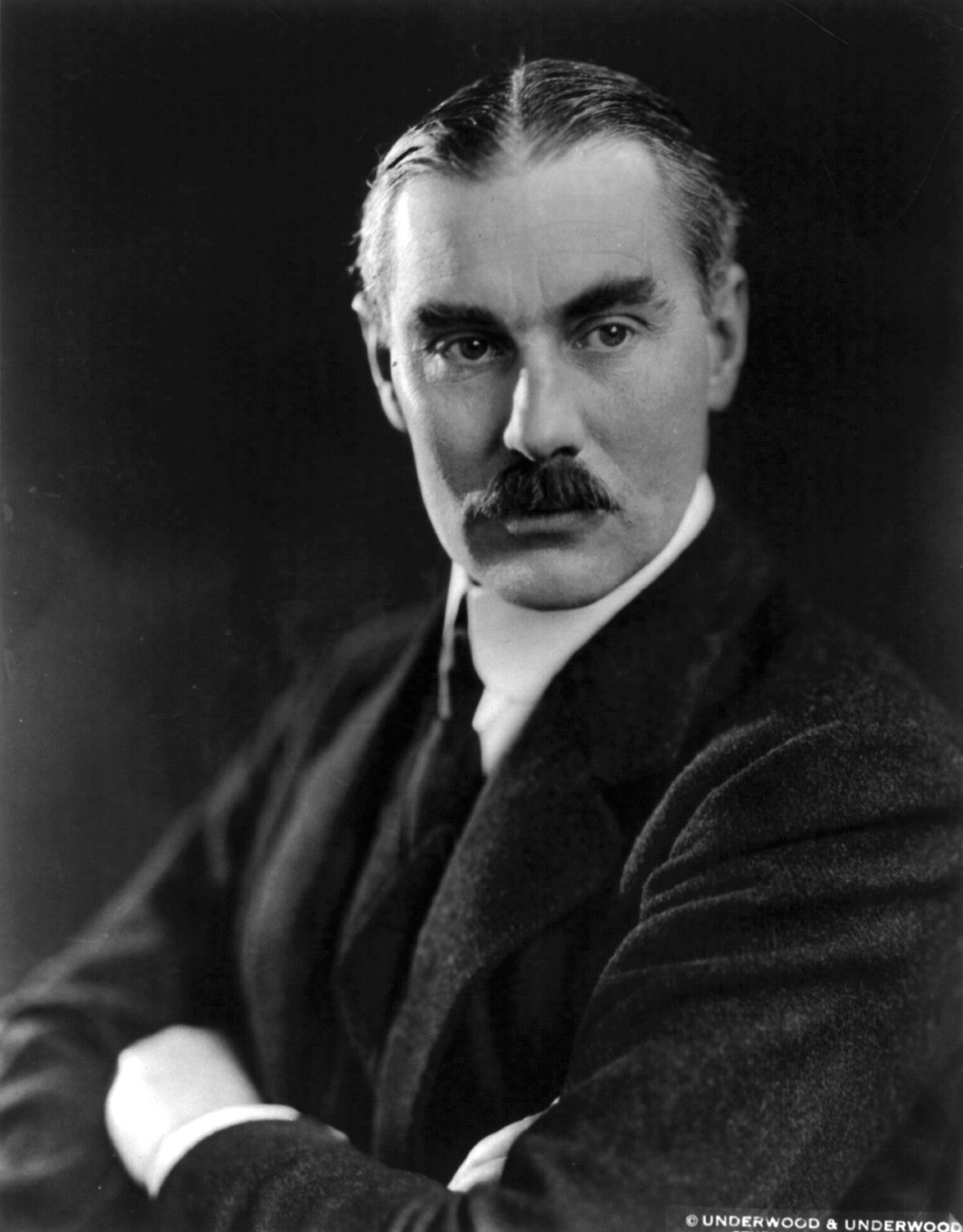
Joseph Grew, pictured in 1924.

== Chapters ==
- I. Marseilles to Singapore
- II. Through the Malay Jungle
- III. Impressions of Northern India: Bombay, Jaipore, Amber, Agra
- IV. Impressions of Northern India: Cawnpore, Lucknow, Benares
- V. Waimungu and the Hot-Spring Country of New Zealand
- VI. The Journey Into Kashmir
- VII. Ibex-Shooting in the Mountains of Baltistan
- VIII. Markhor and Sharpu Shooting in Baltistan
- IX. Black Bear Honking in the Valley of Kashmir
- X. Kashmir to China
- XI. Hunting the Cave-Dwelling Tiger of China
