= United States Under Secretary of State =

Position of the United States Department of State

Under secretary of state (U/S) is a title used by senior officials of the United States Department of State who rank above the assistant secretaries and below the deputy secretary.

From 1919 to 1972, the under secretary was the second-ranking official at the Department of State (immediately beneath the U.S. secretary of state), serving as the secretary's principal deputy, chief assistant, and acting secretary in the event of the secretary's absence. Prior second-ranking positions had been the chief clerk, the assistant secretary of state, and the counselor. Prior to 1944, a number of offices in the department reported directly to the under secretary. In July 1972, the position of deputy secretary superseded that of under secretary of state.

The following is a list of current offices bearing the title of "Under Secretary of State":

- Under Secretary of State for Political Affairs
- Under Secretary of State for Economic Affairs
- Under Secretary of State for Arms Control and International Security
- Under Secretary of State for Public Diplomacy and Public Affairs
- Under Secretary of State for Management
- Under Secretary of State for Foreign Assistance, Humanitarian Affairs, and Religious Freedom

In addition to the six under secretaries, the counselor of the State Department, who advises the secretary of state, holds a rank equivalent to under secretary.

== Current under secretaries of state ==
Under secretaries of state
| Office | Incumbent | Term began |
|---|---|---|
| Under Secretary of State for Political Affairs; 1 FAM 041 | Allison Hooker | June 5, 2025 |
| Under Secretary of State for Economic Affairs; 1 FAM 042 | Jacob Helberg | October 16, 2025 |
| Under Secretary of State for Arms Control and International Security; 1 FAM 043 | Thomas G. DiNanno | October 10, 2025 |
| Under Secretary of State for Management; 1 FAM 044 | Jason S. Evans | September 22, 2025 |
| Under Secretary of State for Foreign Assistance, Humanitarian Affairs, and Religious Freedom; 1 FAM 045 | Andrew Veprek (Acting) | August 28, 2026 |
| Under Secretary of State for Public Diplomacy and Public Affairs; 1 FAM 046 | Sarah B. Rogers | October 10, 2025 |

== Under secretaries of state, 1919–1972 ==
| Name | Home state | Term of office | President(s) served under |
|---|---|---|---|
| Frank Polk | New York | July 1, 1919–June 15, 1920 | Woodrow Wilson |
| Norman Davis | New York | June 15, 1920–March 7, 1921 | Woodrow Wilson and Warren G. Harding |
| Henry P. Fletcher | Pennsylvania | March 8, 1921–March 6, 1922 | Warren G. Harding |
| William Phillips | Massachusetts | April 26, 1922–April 11, 1924 | Warren G. Harding and Calvin Coolidge |
| Joseph Grew | New Hampshire | April 16, 1924–June 30, 1927 | Calvin Coolidge |
| Robert E. Olds | Minnesota | July 1, 1927–June 30, 1928 | Calvin Coolidge |
| J. Reuben Clark | Utah | August 31, 1928–June 19, 1929 | Calvin Coolidge and Herbert Hoover |
| Joseph P. Cotton | New York | June 20, 1929–March 10, 1931 | Herbert Hoover |
| William R. Castle Jr. | District of Columbia | April 2, 1931–March 5, 1933 | Herbert Hoover and Franklin Roosevelt |
| William Phillips | Massachusetts | March 6, 1933–August 23, 1936 | Franklin Roosevelt |
| Sumner Welles | Maryland | May 21, 1937–September 30, 1943 | Franklin Roosevelt |
| Edward Stettinius Jr. | Virginia | October 4, 1943–November 30, 1944 | Franklin Roosevelt |
| Joseph Grew | New York | December 20, 1944–August 15, 1945 | Franklin Roosevelt and Harry Truman |
| Dean Acheson | Maryland | August 16, 1945–June 30, 1947 | Harry Truman |
| Robert A. Lovett | New York | July 1, 1947–January 20, 1949 | Harry Truman |
| James E. Webb | North Carolina | January 28, 1949–February 29, 1952 | Harry Truman |
| David K. E. Bruce | Virginia | April 1, 1952–January 20, 1953 | Harry Truman |
| Walter Bedell Smith | District of Columbia | February 9, 1953–October 1, 1954 | Dwight D. Eisenhower |
| Herbert Hoover Jr. | California | October 4, 1954–February 5, 1957 | Dwight D. Eisenhower |
| Christian Herter | Massachusetts | February 21, 1957–April 22, 1959 | Dwight D. Eisenhower |
| C. Douglas Dillon | New Jersey | June 12, 1959–January 4, 1961 | Dwight D. Eisenhower |
| Chester Bowles | Connecticut | January 25–December 3, 1961 | John F. Kennedy |
| George Ball | District of Columbia | December 4, 1961–September 30, 1966 | John F. Kennedy and Lyndon B. Johnson |
| Nicholas Katzenbach | New Jersey | October 3, 1966–January 20, 1969 | Lyndon B. Johnson |
| Elliot Richardson | Massachusetts | January 23, 1969–June 23, 1970 | Richard Nixon |
| John N. Irwin II | New York | September 21, 1970–July 12, 1972 | Richard Nixon |

== See also ==
- List of undersecretary positions
- Undersecretary
