= Edward Stettinius Jr. =

American businessman and diplomat (1900–1949)

Edward Stettinius
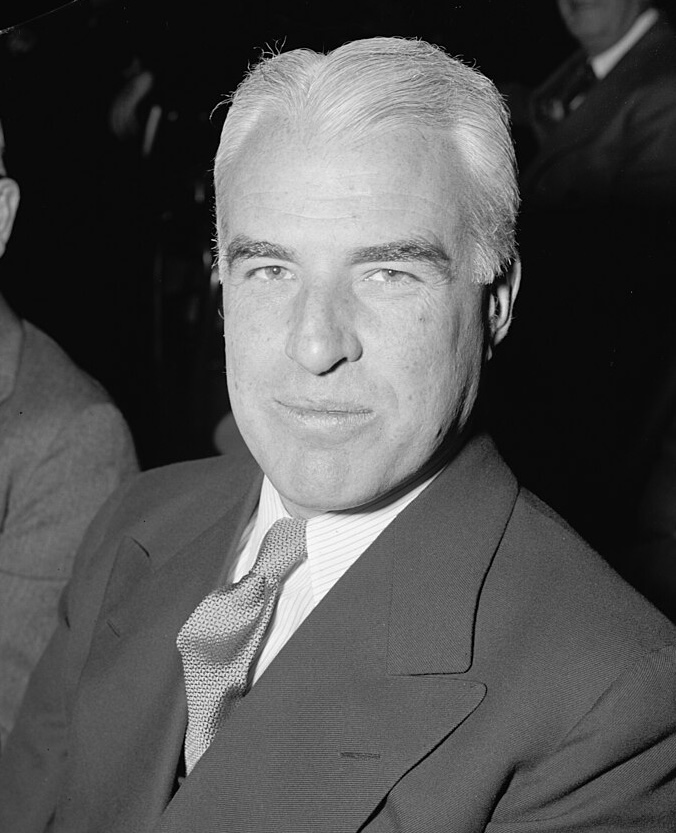
- Stettinius in 1939

1st United States Ambassador to the United Nations
- In office January 17, 1946 – June 3, 1946
- President: Harry S. Truman
- Preceded by: Position established
- Succeeded by: Herschel Johnson (acting)

48th United States Secretary of State
- In office December 1, 1944 – June 27, 1945
- President: Franklin D. Roosevelt; Harry S. Truman
- Preceded by: Cordell Hull
- Succeeded by: James F. Byrnes

12th United States Under Secretary of State
- In office October 4, 1943 – November 30, 1944
- President: Franklin D. Roosevelt
- Preceded by: Sumner Welles
- Succeeded by: Joseph Grew

Administrator of the Office of Lend-Lease Administration
- In office March 11, 1941 – September 25, 1943
- President: Franklin D. Roosevelt
- Preceded by: Position established
- Succeeded by: Leo Crowley (Foreign Economic Administration)

Personal details
- Born: Edward Reilly Stettinius Jr. October 22, 1900 Chicago, Illinois, U.S.
- Died: October 31, 1949 (aged 49) Greenwich, Connecticut, U.S.
- Resting place: Locust Valley Cemetery
- Party: Democratic
- Spouse: Virginia Gordon
- Children: 3
- Relatives: Edward R. Stettinius (father)
- Education: University of Virginia (attended)

Edward Reilly Stettinius Jr. (October 22, 1900 – October 31, 1949) was an American businessman who served as United States Secretary of State under presidents Franklin D. Roosevelt and Harry S. Truman from 1944 to 1945, and as U.S. Ambassador to the United Nations in 1946.

== Early life and education ==
Stettinius was born in Chicago, Illinois, on October 22, 1900, the younger of two sons and third of four children of Edward R. Stettinius and Judith Carrington. His mother was a Virginian of colonial English ancestry. His father was of German descent and was a native of St. Louis, Missouri.

The younger Stettinius grew up in a mansion on the family's estate on Staten Island and graduated from the Pomfret School in 1920, after which he attended the University of Virginia until 1924. He finished very few courses and never took a degree. Instead he spent his time on charitable outreach to poor families. He became a member of the secret Seven Society.

== Career ==
In 1926, Stettinius began working at General Motors as a stock clerk, but his connections made for rapid advancement. He became assistant to John Lee Pratt, a friend of the family, and by 1931 he had become vice president of public and industrial relations. At General Motors, he worked to develop unemployment relief programs and came into contact with New York governor Franklin Roosevelt.

In the 1930s, Stettinius's work in the private sector alternated with public service. He served on the Industrial Advisory Board of the National Recovery Administration (1933). In 1934 he returned to the private sector when he joined U.S. Steel, the nation's largest corporation; he eventually become chairman in 1938.

He then returned to public service, serving on the National Defense Advisory Commission, as chairman of the War Resources Board (1939) and administrator of the Lend-Lease Program (1941). He held the latter position until he became undersecretary of state in 1943. In January 1944, Macmillan published his book, Lend-Lease, Weapon for Victory.

The poor health of Secretary of State Cordell Hull made Stettinius the chair of the 1944 Dumbarton Oaks Conference and, in December 1944, he succeeded Hull as Secretary of State.

Stettinius was a member of the US delegation to the February 1945 Yalta Conference.

Truman thought Stettinius was too soft on communism, and had yielded too much to Moscow when he was Roosevelt's advisor at Yalta. (Note: Ales was in Yalta, Moscow, Mexico City, and San Francisco when Stettinius and his Assistant Wilder Foote were. Ales was associated with GRU information such as tank production and steel production. After Moscow Ales attended a function with Colonel General Fyodor Fedotovich Kuznetsov, who was the head of GRU on Soviet Army's General Staff from March 1943 to September 1947, and Colonel Mikhail Abramovich Milstein, who was a GRU officer active in the United States and Canada during the late 1930s, attended the Yalta conference and whose code name was “Mil’sky”. While Ales was in Moscow, he was congratulated for his work for the Soviet Union.) Truman had an old Senate friend in mind as a replacement, James F. Byrnes. Stettinius resigned as Secretary of State to accept the position of the first United States Ambassador to the United Nations. He chaired the United States delegation to the United Nations Conference on International Organization held in San Francisco from April 25 to June 26, 1945, which brought together delegates from 50 Allied nations to create the United Nations. Charles W. Yost, who had been Under Secretary of State Stettinius' assistant in the State Department, was named Stettinius' Executive Secretary at the United Nations Conference.

Stettinius resigned in June 1946, as he became critical of what he saw as Truman's refusal to use the UN as a tool to resolve tensions with the Soviet Union. For three years after his return to private life, Stettinius served as rector of the University of Virginia. In 1947, Stettinius and friend William Tubman, the president of Liberia, helped form the Liberia Company (now International Registries), a partnership between the Liberian government and American financiers to provide funds for the development of the African nation.

== Personal life ==
On May 15, 1926, Stettinius married Virginia Gordon Wallace, daughter of a prominent family of Richmond, Virginia. They had three children: Edward Reilly III and twins Wallace and Joseph.

During his retirement, Stettinius lived at his Virginia estate, The Horseshoe, on the Rapidan River. He died of a coronary thrombosis on October 31, 1949, at the home of a sister in Greenwich, Connecticut, at the age of 49, and was buried in the family plot in Locust Valley Cemetery, Locust Valley, New York.

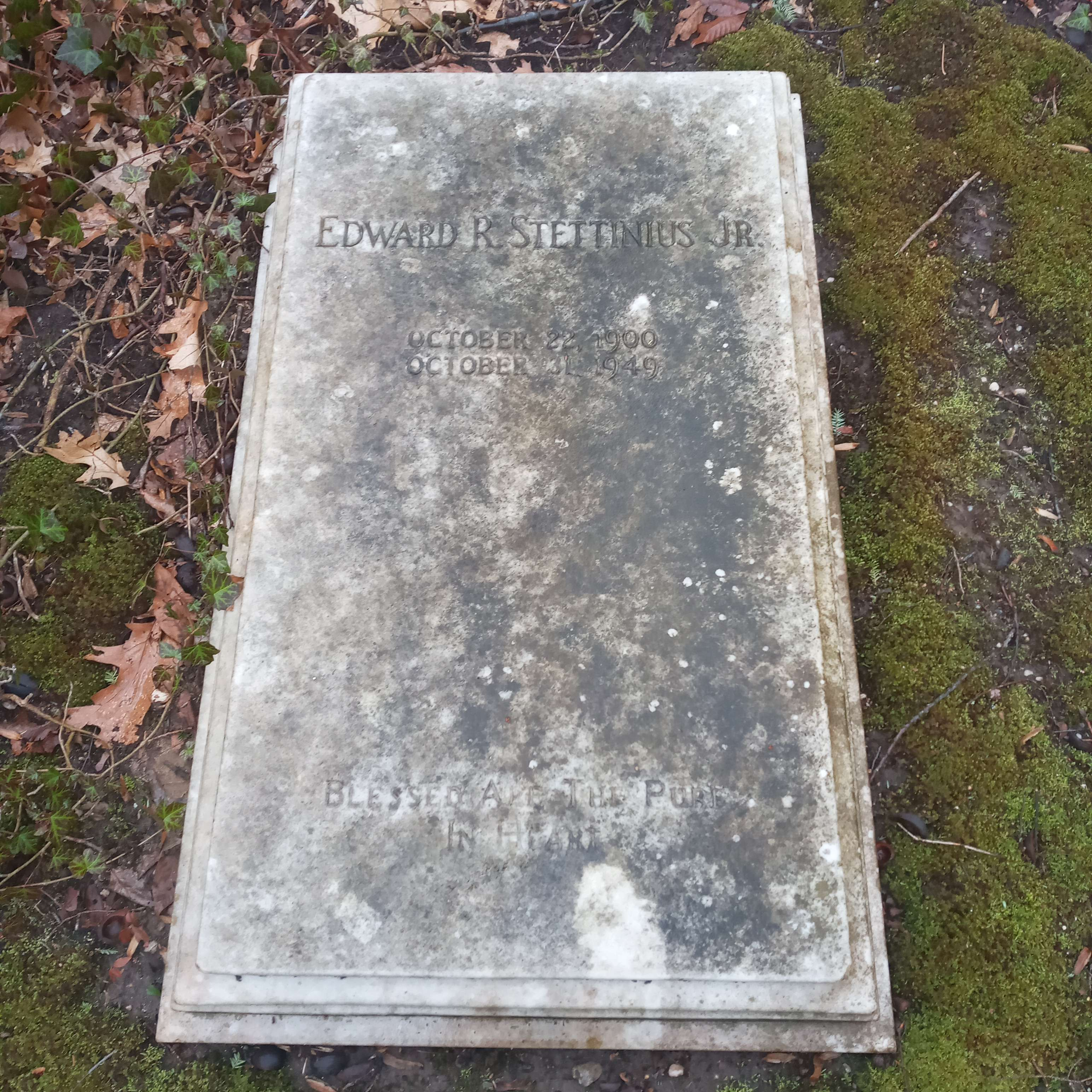
The gravesite of Edward Stettinius Jr.

== Archive ==
Stettinius's voluminous archive of more than 1,000 boxes resides at the Albert and Shirley Small Special Collections Library at the University of Virginia.

== Notes ==
Business positions
Preceded by Myron C. Taylor	Chairman of the Board of U.S. Steel; April 4, 1938 – June 4, 1940	Succeeded by Irving S. Olds
Government offices
New office	Administrator of the Office of Lend-Lease Administration; 1941–1943	Succeeded by Leo Crowley as Administrator of the Foreign Economic Administration
Political offices
Preceded by Sumner Welles	United States Under Secretary of State; 1943–1944	Succeeded by Joseph Grew
Preceded by Cordell Hull	United States Secretary of State; 1944–1945	Succeeded by James F. Byrnes
Diplomatic posts
New office	United States Ambassador to the United Nations; 1946	Succeeded by Herschel Johnson; Acting
