= J. Reuben Clark =

American leader of the LDS Church (1871–1961)

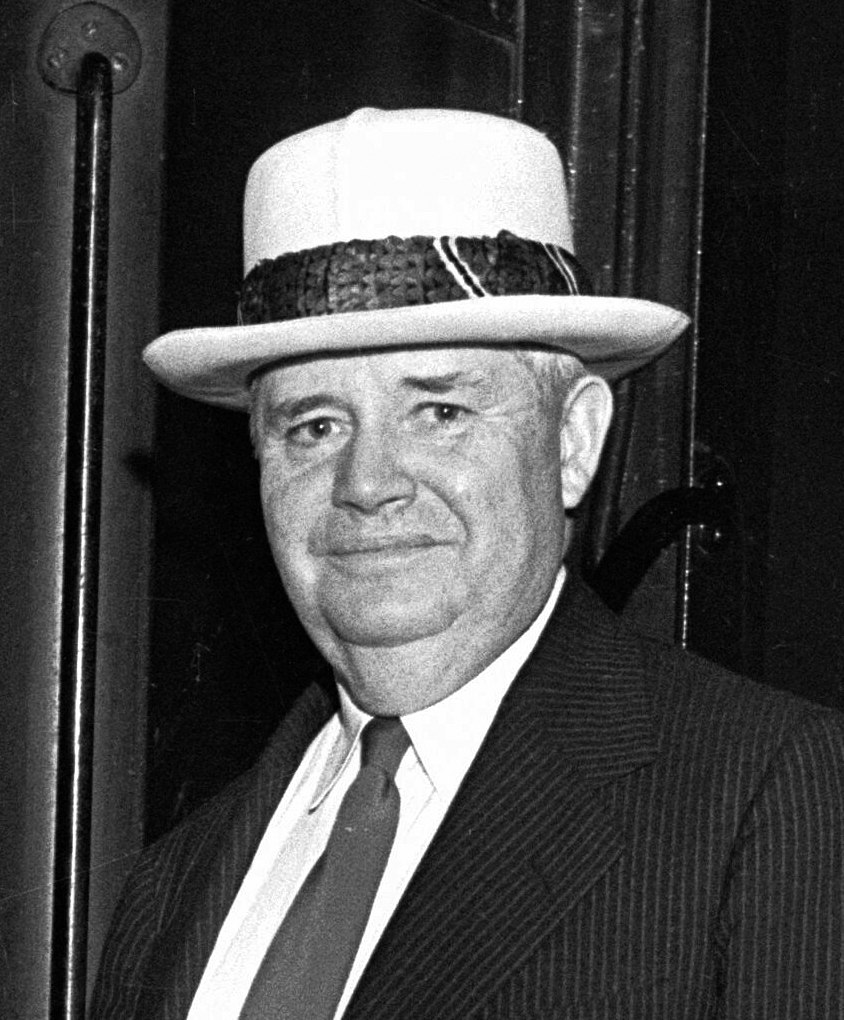
- Clark in 1935

First Counselor in the First Presidency
- June 12, 1959 – October 6, 1961
- Called by: David O. McKay
- May 21, 1945 – April 4, 1951
- Called by: George Albert Smith
- End reason: Death of G. A. Smith
- October 6, 1934 – May 14, 1945
- Called by: Heber J. Grant
- End reason: Death of Grant

Second Counselor in the First Presidency
- April 9, 1951 – June 12, 1959
- Called by: David O. McKay
- End reason: Called as First Counselor in the First Presidency
- April 6, 1933 – October 6, 1934
- Called by: Heber J. Grant
- Predecessor: Charles W. Nibley
- Successor: David O. McKay
- Reason: Death of Charles W. Nibley
- End reason: Called as First Counselor in the First Presidency

Quorum of the Twelve Apostles (Note: Clark was only a member of the Quorum of the Twelve for one week in 1945 and six days in 1951, periods of time when the First Presidency was dissolved due to the death of the church's president.)
- October 11, 1934 – October 11, 1934
- End reason: Was already serving as First Counselor in the First Presidency

LDS Church Apostle
- October 11, 1934 – October 6, 1961
- Called by: Heber J. Grant
- Reason: Heber J. Grant's discretion (Note: Clark had been a member of the First Presidency since 1933.)
- Reorganization at end of term: No additional apostles ordained (Note: After Clark's death, Henry D. Moyle was moved from Second Counselor in the First Presidency to First Counselor; Hugh B. Brown was elevated from Third Counselor in the First Presidency to Second Counselor. Gordon B. Hinckley was added to the Twelve the day before Clark died.)

United States Ambassador to Mexico

In office
- November 28, 1930 – February 14, 1933
- Predecessor: Dwight Morrow
- Successor: Josephus Daniels
- President: Herbert Hoover

7th United States Under Secretary of State

In office
- August 31, 1928 – June 19, 1929
- Predecessor: Robert E. Olds
- Successor: Joseph P. Cotton
- President: Calvin Coolidge; Herbert Hoover
- Political party: Republican

Personal details
- Born: Joshua Reuben Clark, Jr. September 1, 1871; Grantsville, Utah Territory
- Died: October 6, 1961 (aged 90); Salt Lake City, Utah, U.S.
- Resting place: Salt Lake City Cemetery; 40°46′37.92″N 111°51′28.8″W
- Alma mater: University of Utah; Columbia University (LLB)
- Spouse(s): Luacine Annetta Savage
- Children: 4

Joshua Reuben Clark Jr. (September 1, 1871 – October 6, 1961) was an American attorney, civil servant, and a leader in the Church of Jesus Christ of Latter-day Saints (LDS Church). Born in Grantsville, Utah Territory, he was an attorney in the Department of State and was Undersecretary of State for U.S. President Calvin Coolidge until 1930, when he was appointed United States Ambassador to Mexico. In 1933, Clark was called to the LDS Church's First Presidency, serving as counselor to three of its presidents.

Clark received a bachelor's degree from the University of Utah, where he was valedictorian and student-body president. Clark received a law degree from Columbia University, where he also became a member of Phi Delta Phi, a prominent international legal fraternity in which he remained active throughout his life. Clark became an associate professor at George Washington University. Both the J. Reuben Clark Law Society and the J. Reuben Clark Law School at Brigham Young University (BYU) are named in his honor.

== Early family life ==
Clark was the first of ten children born to Joshua R. and Mary Louisa Woolley Clark. He was born and raised in Grantsville, Utah, 33 miles southwest of Salt Lake City in Tooele Valley. At the time, it was a four-hour trip by buggy and train from Grantsville to Salt Lake City. The LDS Church members who settled the area were industrious and community-oriented.

As a break from farmwork, Clark participated in dramatic productions from his youth. He displayed a talent for public speaking, comedy, and humor at a young age. He also participated in the childhood diversions available on the frontier, sledding in the winter and swimming in the summer.

Clark's grandfather had been a minister in the Dunker Faith (Church of the Brethren). Clark's father, Joshua, had worked his way west through Utah as a trapper and freighter and felt drawn to the LDS Church after attending his first Sunday service, being baptized a month afterward. Education and culture were important in the Mormon communities in Utah Territory. Clark's father, although accustomed to hard physical labor, was also reputed to be a knowledgeable, culturally-oriented man. He was hired soon after his baptism to teach school in Grantsville.

Shortly after moving there from Salt Lake City, Clark's father married Mary Louisa Woolley, who was born on the plains as her parents made their way west with the Mormon pioneers. Clark's father was the sort of man who, while doing business in Salt Lake City, would sleep in a hay loft to afford to see a Shakespearean play, and he would make great sacrifices to afford to buy a good book. The small library in the Clark home was made up of history books, classics, an encyclopedia, the Bible, plus other religious works of the LDS Church. Although the younger Clark's education was spotty in his youth because of the demands of farm life and meager family resources, he was able to take music lessons and to play with various bands. He played the piccolo and then the flute.

Clark's father became the clerk, then superintendent, of the Grantsville educational co-operative, was elected the Tooele County Superintendent of Schools in 1878, became president of the Tooele County Education Association, and by 1879 was assessor and tax collector, with his two eldest sons helped with the accounting and record-keeping.

When his father later taught at a local private school, Clark was able to be formally educated for the first time. He was ten years old and had been schooled by his mother. Clark was not at school every term; sometimes, financial difficulties and farm work kept him at home. His father once related that Clark would "rather miss his meals than to miss a day from school." After completing the eighth grade, the highest grade offered at the Grantsville school, Clark repeated it two more times.

== College education and early career ==
In 1890, at age 19 and with his father’s consent, Clark was taken to Salt Lake City to enter Latter-day Saints' University. Clark lived at the home of an aunt to save money, and he earned extremely high grades. The principal of the school was James E. Talmage, the foremost scholar and scientist in the LDS Church. Talmage hired Clark to be the assistant curator (and later, curator) for the Deseret Museum. It was a paid position and helped immensely to support Clark during his higher education. The curator position was also considered a mission and relieved Clark of being called to serve a formal full-time LDS Church mission. When Talmage was released as principal and called to create a new college for the LDS Church, he brought Clark with him as his chemistry lab assistant and clerk. While Clark would still curate at the museum, this helped Clark with his financial support and enabled him to finish six years of advanced schooling in four. Two of the years were intended to finish his unmet high school requirements. It was Talmage who called Clark "the greatest mind ever to leave Utah" and who encouraged him to attend an eastern university.

In 1894, Clark entered the University of Utah. He lived frugally and was even able to partially support his father, who had been called to serve as a missionary in the church's Northern States Mission, then as the mission president.

Talmage later became the president of the University of Utah and was also the first recipient of the recently endowed Deseret Professorship of Geology. Clark graduated in 1898 as valedictorian of his graduating class, while still serving as clerk to Talmage and on the faculty of the university. He had met Luacine ("Lute") Annetta Savage, the youngest daughter of Charles Roscoe Savage of Salt Lake City, in 1894, but he could not afford to marry her. She taught kindergarten and then worked at her father's store while dating Clark for four years. They married on September 14, 1898, in the Salt Lake Temple. Talmage performed the sealing, the first he performed. The couple had a modest reception by Lute's choice, owing to Clark's small means, but she came from a prosperous family. A few days later, Clark left for Heber, Utah, to find a place for them to live and start his first career position as a teacher and principal of the new Heber City High School.

The next year, Clark signed on as a teacher at Latter-day Saints' University, but he resigned in February to teach at Salt Lake Business College. Joseph Nelson headed the college and became an important benefactor to Clark. In the fall of 1900, Clark went to Cedar City, Utah, to become the principal of the Branch Normal School. The following year, Clark was an instructor in Commercial Law, Principal of the Shorthand Department, and Secretary of the Faculty at Salt Lake Business College. In 1903, Nelson was named cashier of the Utah National Bank, and Clark assumed most of his duties at the college. That year, Nelson offered to pay for law school for Clark, and Clark applied to Columbia University. He was accepted, and he received his entire education in law at Columbia.

=== Columbia ===
In the beginning of Clark's second year of law school at Columbia, he was elected to the editorial board of the Columbia Law Review. He was the oldest on the board, the only one married, and the only Latter-day Saint in the law school. In 1905, at the end of his second year of law school, he was admitted to the New York bar. He was granted a Bachelor of Laws degree in 1906. Clark had worked with James Brown Scott on the 772-page book Cases on Quasi Contracts (1905) during his schooling. Scott recommended him as Assistant Solicitor of the Department of State, and Clark received the appointment on September 5, 1906.

== Government service and law career ==
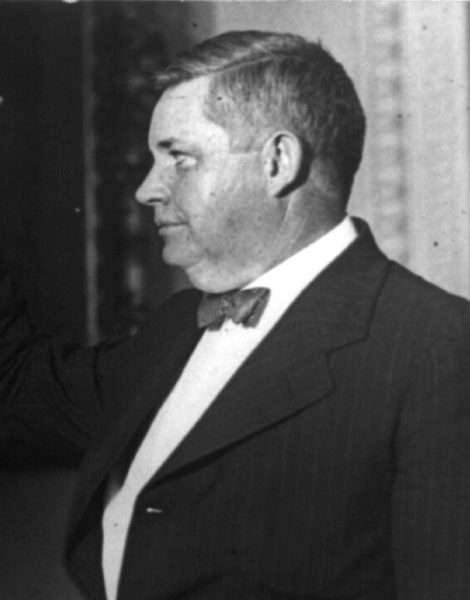
Clark being sworn in as Undersecretary of State

Clark began his government service in 1906, when he was appointed Assistant Solicitor to the State Department. During his tenure in Washington, the Clark family (consisting of Clark, his wife and four children) was in the wake of the controversy over the Reed Smoot hearings in the US Senate.

In his position as Assistant Solicitor and then as Solicitor in the State Department, Clark was often confronted with critical issues of international consequence. For example, when the Mexican Revolution erupted in 1911, he was called upon to make crucial decisions and recommend courses of action to the secretary of state and Howard Taft. Of particular concern to Clark was the plight of the Latter-day Saints who lived in the Mexican colonies and were often caught in the middle of the conflict and whose presence in Mexico was resented by the revolutionaries.

After resigning from the State Department in 1913, after the election of Woodrow Wilson, Clark turned his attention to the practice of law. His family returned to Utah, and he opened law offices in Washington, DC; New York City; and Salt Lake City, specializing in international and corporate law. One of his first major clients was the Japanese government, which enlisted his services to combat anti-Japanese discrimination in California. Officials in the Japanese government extended an offer for him to become their permanent counsel in Tokyo and to reside in the Imperial Palace. Clark declined the offer, partly on the advice of Joseph F. Smith.

When the United States entered World War I, Clark was commissioned as a major in the Judge Advocate General Officer Reserve Corps (Army) and later asked to become Special Counsel to the Judge Advocate General. Also during World War I, Clark worked in the U.S. Attorney General's office. He also participated in creating the regulations for the Selective Service.

In 1926, Clark was called back into government service as tensions with Mexico flared. His past experience in Mexican affairs as solicitor and his experience in diplomacy were called upon as the US President appointed him to the Mexican and American Mixed Claims Commission. The Commission, established by treaty in 1924 to settle monetary disputes between the two countries, was thought to be the best means of avoiding war with Mexico. Other positions of national prominence followed, such as appointments to Special Counsel for the United States before the American-British Claim Arbitration and then Agent for the United States on the US-Mexico General and Special Claims commissions. Later, Clark took a position as personal legal adviser to the US Ambassador to Mexico, Dwight Morrow, who had been impressed with Clark's work in the State Department.

In 1928, as Under-Secretary of State to Secretary of State Frank Kellogg in the Calvin Coolidge administration, Clark wrote the "Clark Memorandum on the Monroe Doctrine", which repudiated the idea that the United States could arbitrarily use military force in Latin America. The Memorandum was a 238-page treatise exploring every nuance of the US's philosophy of hemispherical guardianship. It was published as an official State Department document and partially reprinted in textbooks for years.

When Morrow resigned as ambassador to serve in the U.S Senate, Clark was recommended as his replacement. Herbert Hoover appointed Clark as Ambassador Extraordinary and Plenipotentiary of the United States to Mexico on October 3, 1930. That was a key post in US foreign relations and earned him instant prestige. Clark served as US ambassador to Mexico from 1930–1933.

Later, while Clark was serving in the LDS Church's First Presidency, he was summoned to the White House by President Franklin D. Roosevelt, who asked him to be a delegate to the Pan-American Conference at Montevideo, Uruguay. Again, in 1933, Roosevelt tapped Clark, this time to serve on the newly-formed Foreign Bondholders Protective Council.

== LDS Church service ==
In June 1925, Clark was appointed to the LDS Church's board of the Young Men's Mutual Improvement Association. In April 1933, Clark was called to serve second counselor in the church's First Presidency to Heber J. Grant. Grant held the position in the First Presidency vacant for over a year until Clark was able to resign from his ambassadorship and resolve necessary government matters.

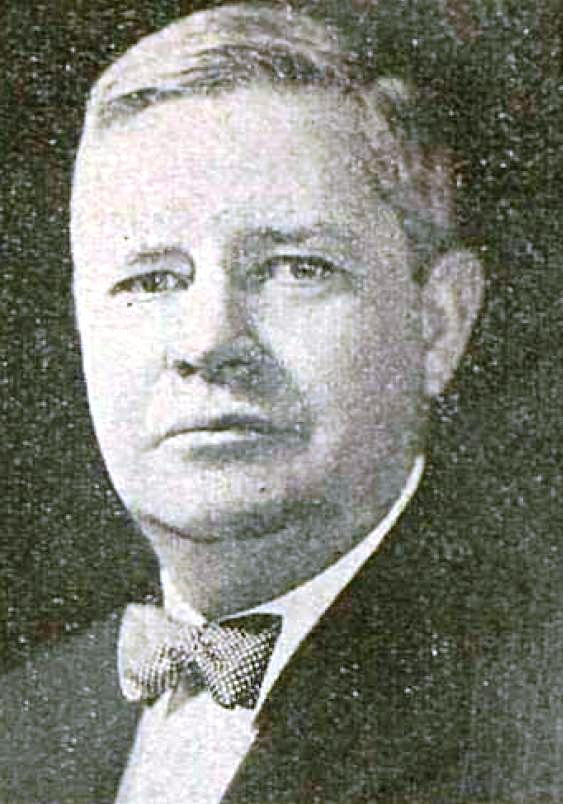
ca. 1914

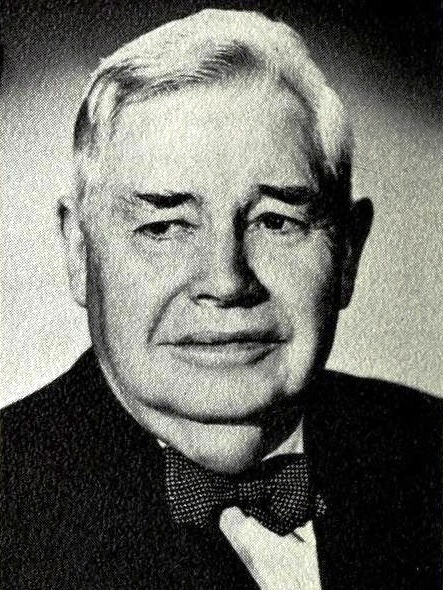
Published in 1962

Clark was sustained as second counselor to Grant on April 6, 1933. He replaced Charles W. Nibley, who had died in December 1931. The call was unusual not only for the delay between Nibley's death and Clark's call, but also because counselors were generally selected from within the church's general authorities.

Clark had also never been a stake president or bishop in the church. He immediately set out to relieve Grant of some of the administrative duties he placed upon himself that became a source of fatigue.

Grant had been active in business throughout his life and encouraged his new second counselor to continue to take advantage of business and governmental opportunities whenever possible. Grant believed the interests of the LDS Church would be best served by Clark continuing to be involved in leadership endeavors outside the church. A week after joining the First Presidency, Clark was asked to fill a position on the board of directors of the Equitable Life Assurance Society of the United States, headquartered in New York. Soon afterward came the appointment as a delegate to the Pan-American Conference. Grant gave his approval to both proposals, and Clark felt duty-bound to again serve.

Following the church's October 1933 general conference, Roosevelt again asked Clark to serve on the Foreign Bondholders' Protective Council. As the Great Depression ravaged the world's economies, a billion dollars in US citizen-owned foreign bonds had fallen into default. Clark was asked to lead the council's effort in recovering money on the defaulted bonds, first as general counsel and then as council president.

In 1933, Clark began urging change in the LDS Church's welfare policy, which directed members to seek assistance from the government before the church, to adopt many of the innovative techniques instituted by Harold B. Lee of the Salt Lake Pioneer Stake to aid church members, such as employment co-ordination, operation of a farm and cannery, and the organization of jobs for stake members to refurbish and sell a Utah company's unsold, defective products.

=== Apostleship ===
In September 1934, Grant's first counselor, Anthony W. Ivins, died. In October 1934, Clark was ordained an apostle and member of the Quorum of the Twelve Apostles for purposes of seniority. Immediately thereafter, he was set apart as Grant's first counselor, with David O. McKay as the second counselor.

In 1935, Grant presented a new "Church Security" program, renamed the "Welfare Plan" in 1938, which encouraged industry and personal responsibility and enabled the members to turn to the church instead of relying on the "demoralizing system" of government dependence. The Welfare Plan would centralize the church's efforts and grow to include a "Beautification Program," church farms, Deseret Industries, and a Bishop's Central Storehouse. In a special meeting of stake presidents on October 2, 1936, Clark would capture the goal of church welfare: "The real long term objective of the Welfare Plan is the building of character in the members of the Church, givers and receivers, rescuing all that is finest deep down inside of them, and bring to flower and fruitage the latent richness of the spirit which after all is the mission and purpose and reason for being of this Church." Clark's counsel remains the guiding principle of LDS Church welfare.

In 1940, Clark initiated a project to transmit sessions of general conference to additional assembly halls via closed circuit radio. In February 1940, Grant suffered a stroke that left the left side of his body paralyzed and eventually led to his virtual incapacitation. Soon afterward, McKay fell seriously ill, and by necessity, Clark took the reins of LDS Church administration, but he always kept the other members of the First Presidency apprised and consulted with them prior to making any major decision.

After Grant's death in 1945, Clark and McKay were also first and second counselors, respectively, to George Albert Smith. However, when Smith died in 1951 and McKay became church president, he surprised some by choosing Clark as his second counselor, with Stephen L Richards as first counselor. McKay cited the longer tenure of Richards as an apostle as the only reason for not making Clark his first counselor, although Clark's leadership style also clashed with McKay's way of doing things. It was upon being sustained as second counselor in a general conference that Clark famously remarked, "In the service of the Lord, it is not where you serve but how. In the Church of Jesus Christ of Latter-day Saints, one takes the place to which one is duly called, which place one neither seeks nor declines." Clark was returned to the position of first counselor after Richards died in 1959. Although he served in that capacity until his death on October 6, 1961, McKay excluded Clark from much of the decision-making.

In the 1950s, while serving as second counselor in the First Presidency, Clark was able to see two major religious works he had been working on for several years published. In 1954, Our Lord of the Gospels, a deep study of the life of Jesus Christ, was brought to publication, with Thomas S. Monson serving as the representative of Deseret Book in the publishing project. In 1956, Clark's work Why the King James Version, advocating continued use of the King James Bible by the church, was published.

Clark was closely involved with most of the administrative innovations of the church while he was in the First Presidency. He was involved especially in advocating for regional priesthood councils.

== Death ==
Clark died on October 6, 1961, at his residence, 80 D Street, Salt Lake City, Utah, at ninety years of age. Clark served in the First Presidency for over 28 years, longer than any other man who has not been church president. He was buried at Salt Lake City Cemetery.

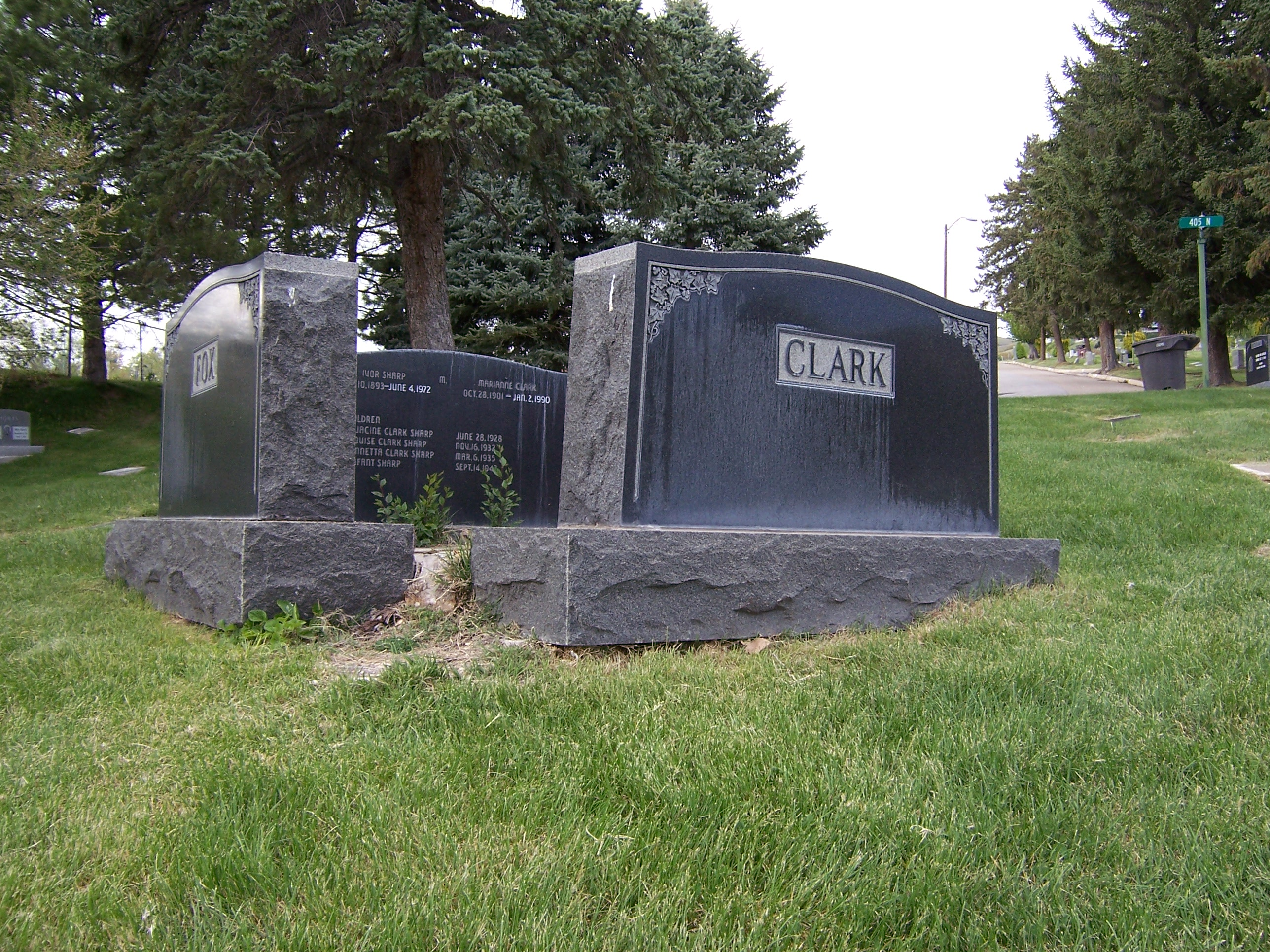
Clark family grave markers.

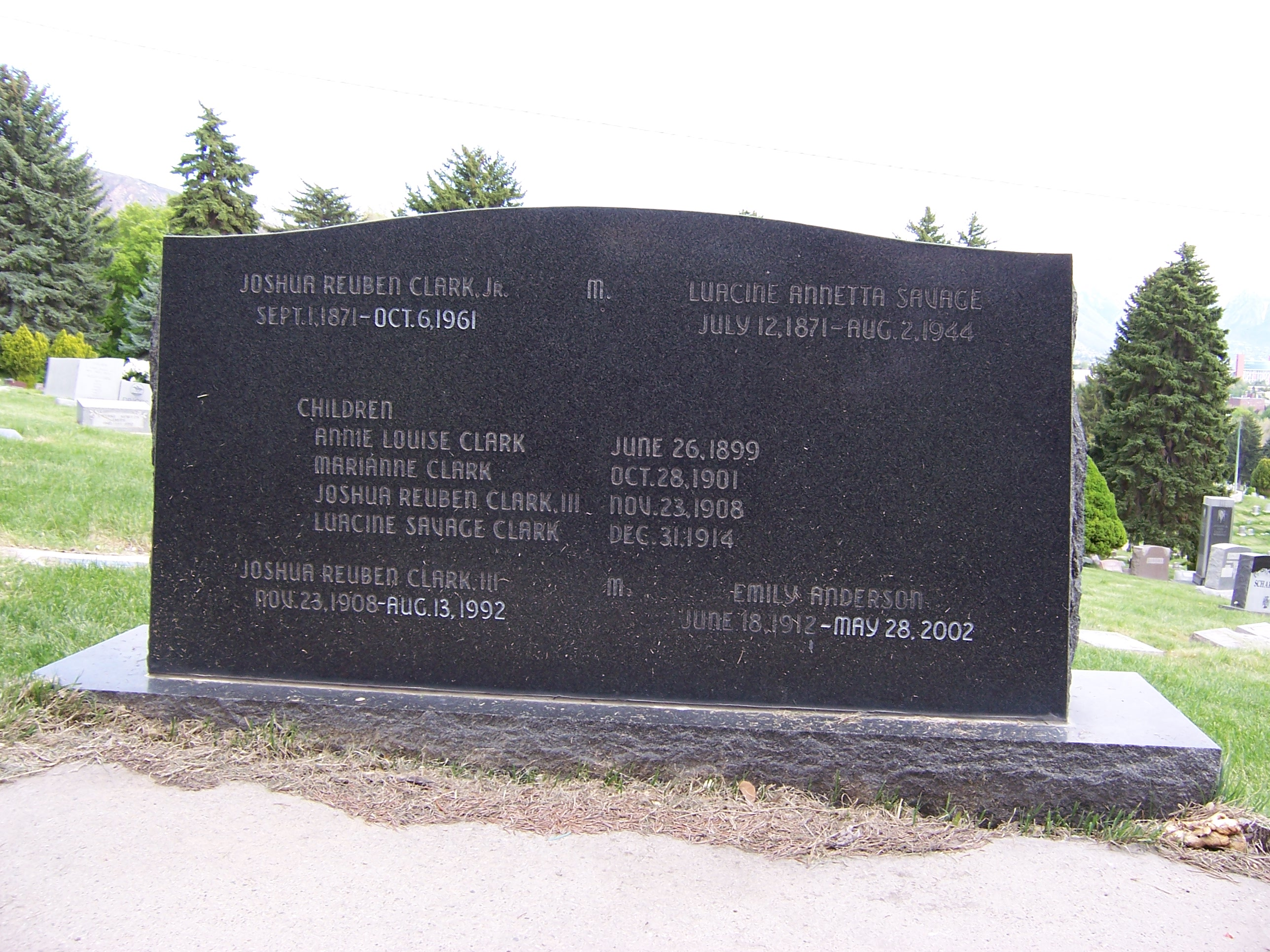
Family grave marker, back view.

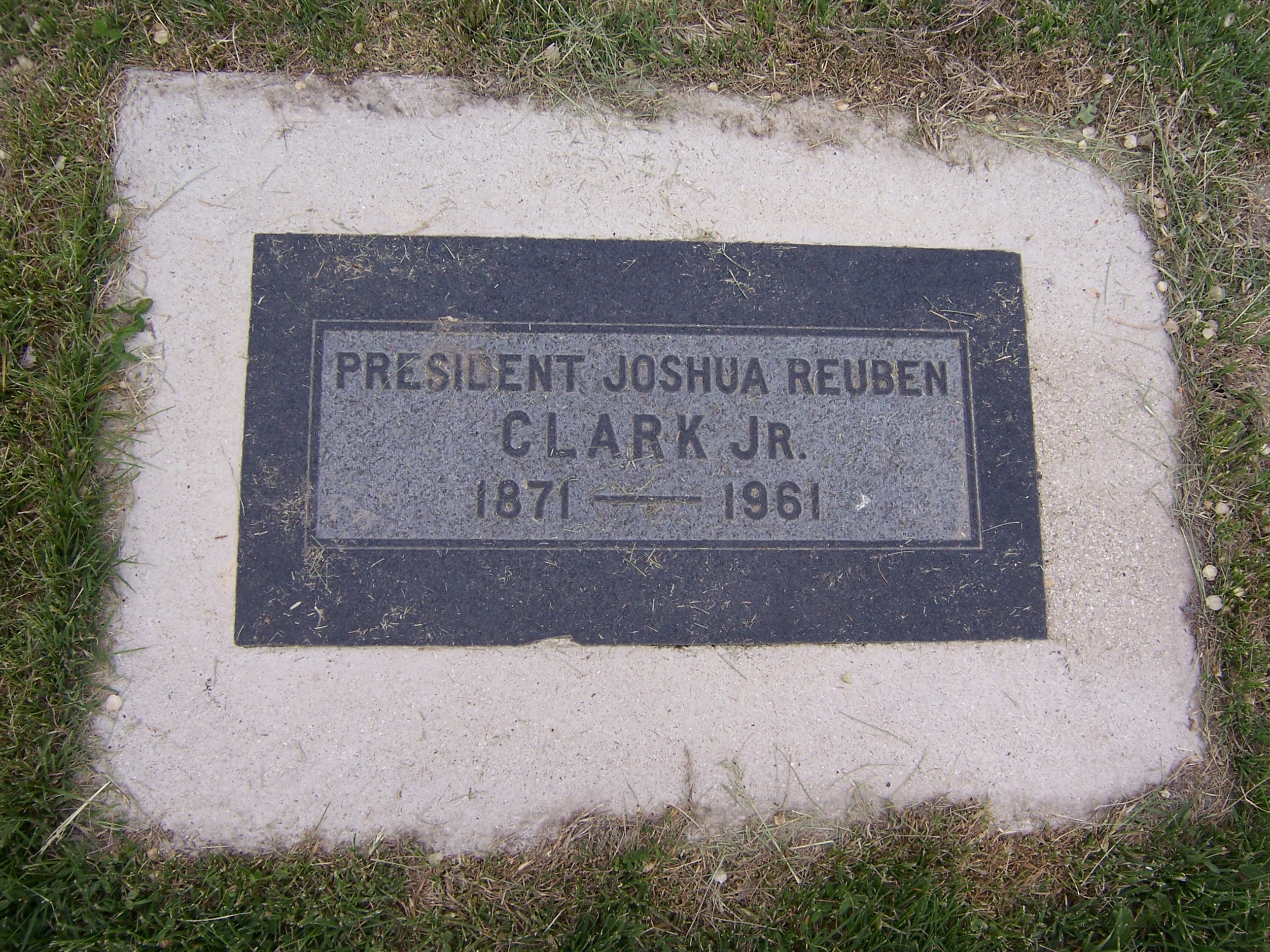
Headstone of Clark.

== Racism and antisemitism ==
As noted in D. Michael Quinn's 2002 biography, Clark's life spanned a period that saw "enormous changes in the attitudes and conduct of Western society, the United States, and the LDS Church toward the races and ethnic peoples of the world." As a young man, writes Quinn, Clark possessed "the full endowment of racism characteristic of late nineteenth-century America." Clark's nativist views were evident in his 1898 valedictory speech at the University of Utah in which he declared, "America must cease to be the cess-pool into which shall drain the foul sewage of Europe." Clark eventually changed some of his racial and ethnic views but maintained others to the end of his life.

Speaking to a church audience in 1956 about his service as U.S. Ambassador to Mexico, Clark admitted that he had gone to Mexico "with a great prejudice against the Mexican people." However, as he learned the people's history and lived among them, he came to develop a great affection for them.

Clark's views of the Japanese softened after he performed legal work on behalf of the Japanese embassy in 1913. Although his son-in-law, Mervyn S. Bennion, was killed during the attack on Pearl Harbor, Clark "neither felt nor manifested any bitterness toward the Japanese," according to Quinn. Clark wrote to an LDS serviceman on August 3, 1945, "I have nothing but kindness for the [Japanese] race."

During Clark's lifetime, Utah had de facto segregation policies, and males of African descent were excluded from the LDS priesthood. As a church leader, Clark resisted the social integration of whites and blacks and strongly opposed interracial marriage, explaining in a 1949 letter: "Since they are not entitled to the Priesthood, the Church discourages social intercourse with the negro race, because such intercourse leads to marriage, and the offspring possess negro blood and is therefore subject to the inhibition set out in our Scripture."

Clark nevertheless expressed support for Brown v. Board of Education, stating that "the Latter-day Saints willingly accord to [blacks] in civil matters all the rights, privileges, liberties, and protection guaranteed them ... in all their social, economic, and political activities."

Quinn notes that "there was one ethnic group, however, for whom Reuben expressed lifelong dislike and distrust—the Jewish people." According to Quinn, Clark kept several copies of The Protocols of the Elders of Zion in his personal library and shared it and other antisemitic publications with colleagues and acquaintances. He expressed antisemitic attitudes in "code words publicly and in specifics privately" and used his church position to obstruct what he perceived as "Jewish influence." After Nazi Germany's annexation of Austria, Clark denied desperate pleas by Austrian Mormon converts from Judaism who sought the church's help in emigrating to safety.

Clark's antisemitism seems to have derived at least in part from his ardent anti-Communism. Quinn notes that "although not all American anti-Communists were anti-Semitic, the more intense tended to be. Reuben's own fusion of anti-Communism and anti-Semitism was representative of this tendency."

Clark's views put him at odds with LDS Church president David O. McKay, whose "positive attitudes toward the Jews, Zionism, and the State of Israel were more representative of Mormons generally than were President Clark's anti-Semitic attitudes and administrative actions."

== Career timeline ==
- 1900–1901 – President of the Branch Normal School (Southern Utah University)
- 1906–1910 – Assistant solicitor for the United States Department of State
- 1907–1908 – Assistant professor of law, George Washington University, Washington, D.C.
- 1910–1913 – Solicitor for the United States Department of State
- 1913 – Appointed counsel for the United States before Tribunal of Arbitration under Special Agreement of August 18, 1910, between the US and Great Britain — $5 million in claims.
- 1914 – Counsel in charge of US Agency, American-British Claims Arbitration
- 1918 – Author, Emergency Legislation and War Powers of the President
- 1919–1920 – Active in the League of Nations controversy
- 1922 – Utah Republican nominee for US Senate, also in 1928
- 1926 – Agent of the United States, General Claims Commission, US and Mexico.
- 1927–1928 – Legal adviser to Ambassador Dwight W. Morrow, Mexico
- 1928 – Author, Memorandum on the Monroe Doctrine
- 1930–1933 – Ambassador Extraordinary and Plenipotentiary of the United States to Mexico
- 1933 – Sustained as second counselor in the First Presidency of the LDS Church, 6 April, Heber J. Grant, President
- 1933 – Named member, board of trustees of Brigham Young University
- 1933 – Delegate of the United States to the Seventh International Conference of American States (Pan-American Conference), Montevideo, Uruguay
- 1933 – Elected director, Equitable Life Assurance Society of the United States, New York City
- 1934 – Sustained as Apostle and as first counselor in the First Presidency, 6 October, Heber J. Grant, President
- 1934–1953 – President, director of KSL Radio Station; vice-president and director of Zions Cooperative Mercantile Institution (ZCMI)
- 1936 – United States representative on Committee for the Study of International Loan Contracts (League of Nations)
- 1944 – Elected Director, Western Pacific Railroad, San Francisco, California
- 1945 – Sustained as first counselor to President George Albert Smith, 21 May, LDS Church
- 1949 – Elected vice-president, First National Bank, 11 January
- 1949 – Elected vice-president, Utah Hotel Company, 23 February
- 1950 – Elected member, board of trustees, the Roosevelt Memorial Association, 27 October
- 1951 – Sustained as second counselor in the First Presidency of the LDS Church, 9 April, David O. McKay, President
- 1952 – Elected vice-president, Zion's Savings Bank and Trust Company, 8 January
- 1952 – Elected vice-president, Utah-Idaho Sugar Company, 20 April
- 1959 – Designated first counselor in the First Presidency of the LDS Church, 12 June, David O. McKay, President
- 1963 – Inducted into the Hall of Great Westerners of the National Cowboy & Western Heritage Museum for his contribution as a farmer, cattleman, and politician.

== Published works ==
- Clark, J. Reuben (1930). Memorandum on the Monroe doctrine. US GPO. ASIN B0006D9U6Q. OCLC 1739572.
- —— (1947). "Gratitude for our heritage": Address before the Salt Lake Rotary Club. Rotary Club. ASIN B0007HE99Y. OCLC 28325923.
- —— (1947). Wist Ye Not That I Must Be About My Father's Business. Reprint, Relief Society Magazine. OCLC 7810610.
- —— (1949). On the way to immortality and eternal life: A series of radio talks. Deseret Book Company. ASIN B0007EJWAS. OCLC 3051171.
- —— (1954). Our Bible: Address at General Conference, The Tabernacle, Salt Lake City, Utah, April 4, 1954. Bookcraft. ASIN B0007H2ZL8. OCLC 22012699.
- —— (1968). Immortality and eternal life. Course of study for the Melchizedek Priesthood quorums. LDS Church. ASIN B0007G3A2C. OCLC 3405390.
- —— (1974) [1954]. Our Lord of the Gospels: a harmony of the Gospels. Deseret Book Company. ASIN B00183Z8S2. OCLC 16790161.
- —— (1978) [1962]. Stand fast by our Constitution. Deseret Book Company. ASIN B0006WZ8SG. OCLC 4558825.
- —— (1979). Why the King James version. Classics in Mormon literature. Deseret Book Company. ISBN 978-0-87747-773-0. OCLC 5008280.
- —— (1987). Yarn, David H. Jr. (ed.). J. Reuben Clark: Selected Papers on Americanism and National Affairs. Deseret Book Company. ISBN 978-0-87579-109-8. OCLC 16004232.
- —— (1991). Behold the Lamb of God. Classics in Mormon literature. Deseret Book Company. ISBN 978-0-87579-536-2. OCLC 23769367.
- —— (1998). To Them of the Last Wagon; and, Who Was This Jesus. Classic Talks Series. Deseret Book Company. ISBN 978-0-87579-975-9. OCLC 40197720.

== Quotes ==
- "There has not been another such group of men in all our history that even challenged the supremacy of this group. It is the union of independence and dependence of these branches—legislative, executive and judicial—and of the governmental functions possessed by each of them, that constitutes the marvelous genius of this unrivaled document. ... It was here that divine inspiration came. It was truly a miracle."

== Notes ==
Political offices
Preceded by Robert E. Olds	United States Under Secretary of State; 1928–1929	Succeeded by Joseph P. Cotton
Diplomatic posts
Preceded by Dwight Morrow	US Ambassador to Mexico; 1930–1933	Succeeded by Josephus Daniels
The Church of Jesus Christ of Latter-day Saints titles
Preceded by Stephen L Richards	First Counselor in the First Presidency; June 12, 1959 – October 6, 1961	Succeeded by Henry D. Moyle
Preceded by David O. McKay	Second Counselor in the First Presidency; April 9, 1951 – June 12, 1959	Succeeded by Henry D. Moyle
Preceded by Anthony W. Ivins	First Counselor in the First Presidency; May 21, 1945 – April 4, 1951; October 6, 1934 – April 9, 1951	Succeeded by Stephen L Richards
Preceded by Charles W. Nibley	Second Counselor in the First Presidency; April 6, 1933 – October 11, 1934	Succeeded by David O. McKay
Preceded by Charles A. Callis	Quorum of the Twelve Apostles; April 4, 1951 – April 9, 1951; May 14, 1945 – May 21, 1945; October 11, 1934 – October 11, 1934	Succeeded by Alonzo A. Hinckley
