= U.S. Initial Post-Surrender Policy for Japan =

The U.S. Initial Post-Surrender Policy for Japan is a legal document approved by U.S. president Harry S. Truman on September 6, 1945, which governed U.S. policy in the occupation of Japan following surrender in the Second World War. It was released to the public on September 22, 1945.

== Background ==
The document titled "U.S. Initial Post-Surrender Policy for Japan" was drafted by the State-War-Navy Coordinating Committee, and approved by that committee on August 29, 1945. Its official designation was SWNCC 150/4 and was approved by the president on September 6, while it was released to the media on September 22.

== Provisions of the document ==
The document set two main objectives for the occupation.

"The ultimate objectives of the United States in regard to Japan, to which policies in the initial period must conform, are:

1. (a) To insure that Japan will not again become a menace to the United States or to the peace and security of the world.
2. (b) To bring about the eventual establishment of a peaceful and responsible government which will respect the rights of other states and will support the objectives of the United States as reflected in the ideals and principles of the Charter of the United Nations. The United States desires that this government should conform as closely as may be to principles of democratic self-government but it is not the responsibility of the Allied Powers to impose upon Japan any form of government not supported by the freely expressed will of the people."

The document also set four main policies to be pursued:

1. Japanese sovereignty only to include the four main Japanese islands of Honshu, Hokkaido, Kyushu, and Shikoku, while the fate of additional islands was to be determined later (this provision was taken from the Potsdam Declaration of July 26, 1945).
2. Japan was to be disarmed, and the military was not to play any important role in Japanese society in the future.
3. The Japanese society was to be encouraged to develop personal liberties, such as freedoms of religion, assembly, speech, and the press, as well as to develop democratically elected institutions.
4. The Japanese economy was to be developed for peaceful purposes.

The document stipulated the occupation was to last until these objectives were to be met, without specifying time limit. Practical control was vested in the Supreme Commander of the Allied Powers (SCAP), appointed by the United States, a post given to General Douglas MacArthur. Other Allied governments were only given symbolic participation in policy making over Japan.

The Japanese government was retained along with the Emperor, but were subjected to SCAP.

The document established freedom of speech and freedom of religion as basic principles, and also prohibited religious and racial discrimination.

Two issues the document referred to were the issue of free elections and the demand for the dissolution of the big businesses then controlling the Japanese economy. The document did not require any policy on these issues, but called upon SCAP to encourage the Japanese government to take steps on these matters.

This non-committal attitude on free elections and corporate control derived from the view of Japanese society as over conservative and not very susceptible to change.

== Aftermath ==
The U.S. Initial Post-Surrender Policy for Japan became an official legal document for the conduct of Japanese affairs during the occupation. Following the establishment of the Allied Council for Japan in December 1945, it was charged with drafting a joint Allied occupation statute for Japan, to be based on the same document. However, opposition among Allied governments to approve a statute that gave the U.S. government the dominant position led to delays, and the new statute was finally approved on June 19, 1947.
