= Robert E. Olds =

American lawyer (1875–1932)

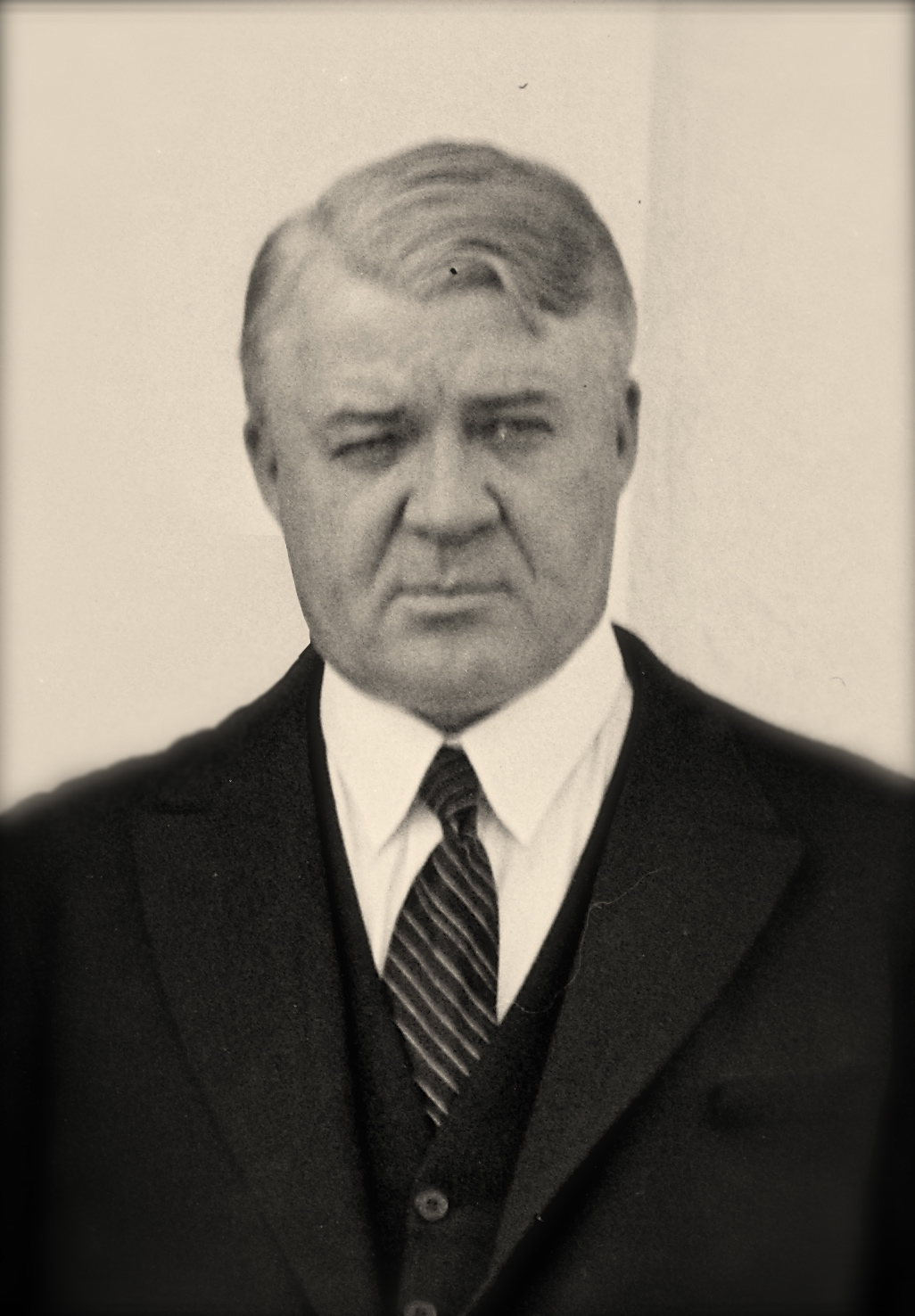
- Olds in 1927

6th United States Under Secretary of State
- In office July 1, 1927 – June 30, 1928
- President: Calvin Coolidge
- Preceded by: Joseph Grew
- Succeeded by: J. Reuben Clark

Personal details
- Born: Robert Edwin Olds; October 22, 1875 Duluth, Minnesota
- Died: November 25, 1932 (aged 57)
- Spouse: Rose Nabersberg
- Profession: Lawyer, Diplomat

Robert Edwin Olds (October 22, 1875 – November 25, 1932) was an American diplomat and lawyer who served as the United States Under Secretary of State from 1927 to 1928.

== Biography ==
Robert E. Olds was born in Duluth, Minnesota, on October 22, 1875. After graduating from Harvard Law School in 1900, he practiced law at Saint Paul, Minnesota, for 17 years where he was a law partner of Frank B. Kellogg. He served as the Commissioner of the American Red Cross in Europe, from 1919 to 1921 during the war and as a United States member of the League of Nations tribunals and commissions. On 17 June 1925, he was appointed as Assistant Secretary of State by President Calvin Coolidge. He was subsequently appointed as Under Secretary of State, on May 19, 1927.

Olds resigned as Under Secretary of State on 30 June 1928. In 1929 he became a member of the reparations commission under the treaty of Versailles. He was appointed as a member of the permanent court of arbitration at the Hague in 1931. He died suddenly on November 25, 1932, in Paris, where he was a member of the council of the International Chamber of Commerce, due to a cerebral hemorrhage.

== Works ==
- Robert Edwin Olds (1930). Etude sur le régime juridique des ententes industrielles. League of Nations.
- Robert Edwin Olds (1932). Trade combinations in U. S. A., France, Germany, Poland. Librairie du Recueil Sirey.

Political offices
| Preceded by Joseph Grew | United States Under Secretary of State; 1927–1928 | Succeeded by J. Reuben Clark |
