= Joseph P. Cotton =

American government official

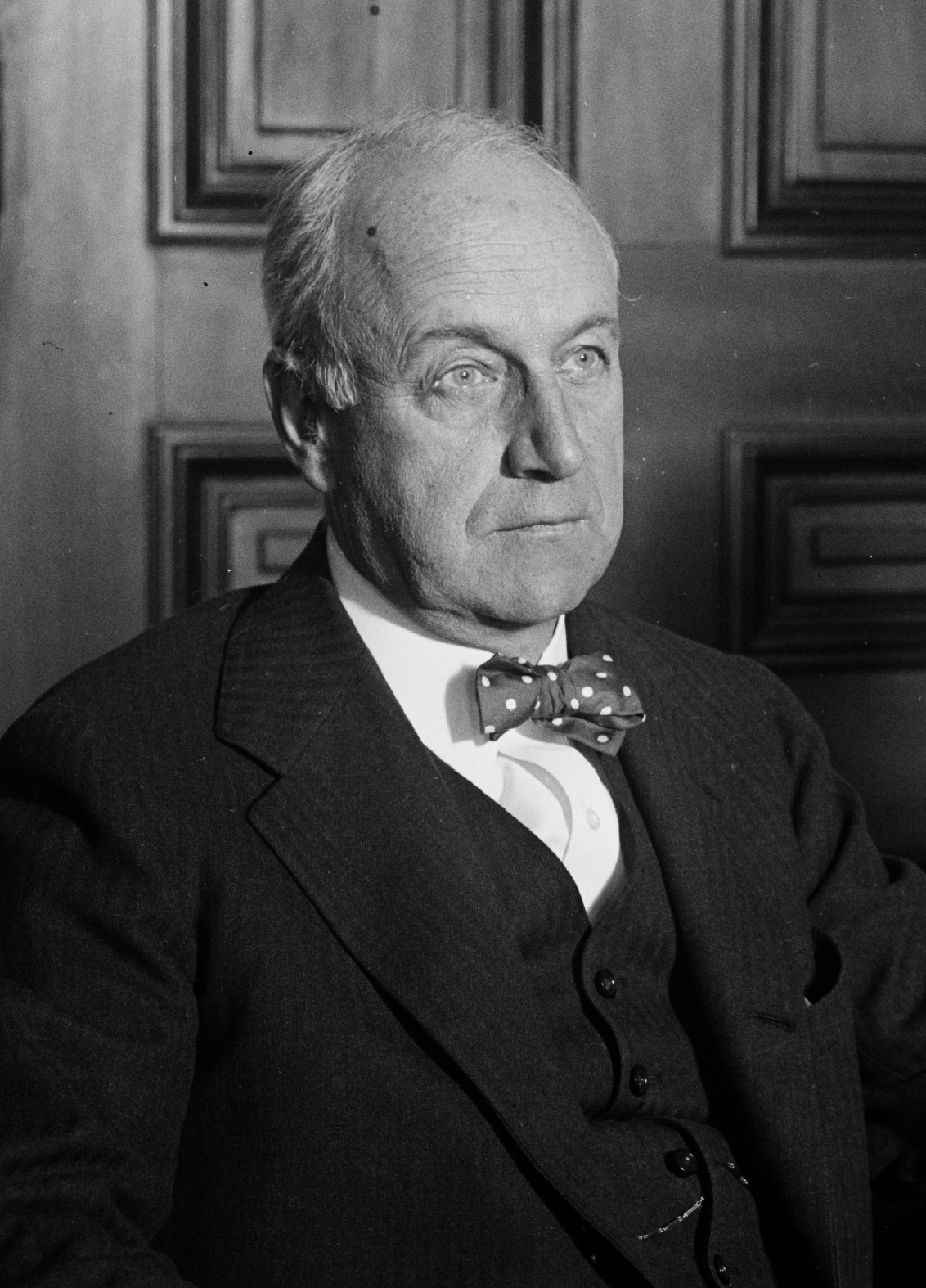

8th United States Under Secretary of State
- In office June 20, 1929 – March 10, 1931
- President: Herbert Hoover
- Preceded by: J. Reuben Clark
- Succeeded by: William Richards Castle Jr.

Personal details
- Born: Joseph Potter Cotton; July 22, 1875 Newport, Rhode Island
- Died: March 10, 1931 (aged 55) Johns Hopkins Hospital in Baltimore, Maryland
- Spouse: Jessie I. Child
- Children: Joseph Potter, Jr. Isabel
- Parent(s): Joseph Potter Cotton; Isabella Cole
- Education: Harvard University (B.A.); Harvard Law School (LL.B.)
- Profession: Lawyer, Politician

Joseph Potter Cotton (July 22, 1875 – March 10, 1931) was an American politician and lawyer who served as the United States Under Secretary of State from 1929 until his death in 1931.

== Biography ==
Cotton was born in Newport, Rhode Island on July 22, 1875. He earned a bachelor of arts degree from Harvard College in 1896 and graduated from Harvard Law School in 1900. In New York, he worked as a prominent lawyer and in 1907 became a member of the law firm Cravath, Henderson and De Gersdorff. In 1910, he joined with John Coit Spooner in the firm of Spooner & Cotton. In 1915, he went to Washington to work as a federal attorney for the Alaskan Railway Commission. He became a law partner of William Gibbs McAdoo in 1919 and founded the firm of McAdoo, Cotton & Franklin. He also served as the Chief of the US Food Administration's Meat Division where he became friends with President Herbert Hoover who then served as the head of the United States Food Administration.

Cotton was a major policy adviser to Hoover and was appointed as the undersecretary of state on June 7, 1929 when the latter became president. He served as the acting secretary of state, and succeeded in maintaining the dominant influence of the United States, when Henry Stimson went to assist as the chairman of the U.S. delegation to the London Naval Conference 1930.

Cotton was admitted at Johns Hopkins Hospital in Baltimore from an infection of the spinal cord where surgeons removed a tumor from his spine. He developed blood poisoning in his right eye, which had to be removed. He underwent two major operations and succumbed to complications from infections on March 10, 1931.

Mr. Cotton's passing is a great loss to the Government and to our country. He was my friend for over 20 years. He has given much of his life to public service and has never refused a demand of the public interest. His abilities, his character, his devotion to the highest of purposes made him a great citizen.

— President Herbert Hoover

== Works ==
- Joseph Potter Cotton (1905). The Constitutional Decisions of John Marshall. ISBN 978-1-58477-050-3. in two volumes Vol. 1, Vol. 2 (New York and London).
- Joseph Potter Cotton (1909). A Preliminary Analysis of the Legal System of Employers Liability in the State of New York. ISBN 9781584770503.

Political offices
Preceded by J. Reuben Clark	United States Under Secretary of State; 1929–1931	Succeeded by William Richards Castle Jr.
