= Edward R. Stettinius =

American businessman

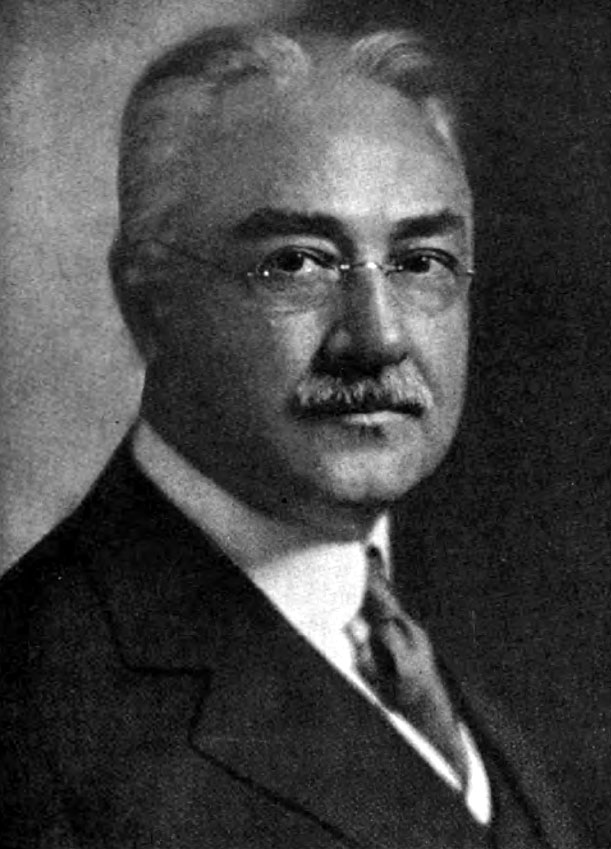
- Born: Edward Reilly Stettinius; February 15, 1865; St. Louis, Missouri
- Died: September 3, 1925 (aged 60); Locust Valley, New York
- Resting place: Locust Valley Cemetery, Locust Valley, New York, U.S.
- Education: St. Louis University
- Known for: President of Diamond Match Company
- Spouse: Judith Carrington
- Children: Edward Stettinius Jr. Elizabeth Stettinius

Edward Reilly Stettinius (February 15, 1865 – September 3, 1925) was an American executive. He was president of Diamond Match Company in Barberton, Ohio, for a time. After the start of World War I, he worked at J. P. Morgan and Company coordinating the purchase of war supplies for the Allies. When the United States entered the war, he went to work in its War Department.

== Biography ==
Stettinius was born in St. Louis, Missouri. His father was a wholesale grocer.

He was educated at St. Louis University. The needs of his family obligated him to drop out of school at age 16, and he went to work for a grocery firm and then a hat and cap firm. He then tried several lines of business on his own account, but was not very successful, and went to work in a banking firm.

By 1891, both his mother and father had died, and he went to the commodity exchange at the Chicago Board of Trade, but did not find that he could satisfactorily predict the price of wheat and left to become treasurer in the Stirling Boiler Company. The business panic of 1893 obligated him to add several other tasks to the one of treasurer. As conditions improved, he began to work in sales, doing well enough that he became general manager of the company. His participation in the merger of that company and several others in the same line to form Babcock & Wilcox helped his reputation, and he was recruited to work at Diamond Match Company, where he became president in 1909. His employer at Stirling was O. C. Barber, who also used his influence to make him president at Diamond Match, where Stettinius succeeded him.

At the beginning of World War I, Stettinius went to work as a partner for J. P. Morgan and Company where he worked as chief buyer of war supplies for the Allies, overseeing a work force of around 150 people. When the United States entered the war, he went to work for the War Department, in charge of procurement and production of supplies for the Army. On April 6, 1918, he became Assistant Secretary of War. He received the Distinguished Service Medal from the War Department in recognition of his service.

After the war, he went back to work for Morgan and Company, devoting his attention to restructuring large companies. He died at Locust Valley, New York on September 3, 1925. Edward is buried in Locust Valley Cemetery, Locust Valley, New York.

== Family ==
He married Judith Carrington of Richmond, Virginia. They had four children, among them Stettinius's namesake, Edward Stettinius Jr., who also worked as a business executive, and was Secretary of State for a time. In 1928, Edward's daughter Elizabeth "Betty" married Juan Trippe, founder of Pan Am Airlines.
