= The Crown season 3 =

Season of television series

The Crown
- Season 3
- Promotional poster
- Starring: Olivia Colman; Tobias Menzies; Helena Bonham Carter; Ben Daniels; Jason Watkins; Marion Bailey; Erin Doherty; Charles Dance; Josh O'Connor
- No. of episodes: 10

Release
- Original network: Netflix
- Original release: 17 November 2019

Season chronology
- ← Previous; Season 2 Next → Season 4

The third season of The Crown follows the life and reign of Queen Elizabeth II. It consists of ten episodes and was released by Netflix on 17 November 2019.

Olivia Colman stars as Elizabeth, along with main cast members Tobias Menzies, Helena Bonham Carter, Ben Daniels, Jason Watkins, Marion Bailey, Erin Doherty, Jane Lapotaire, Charles Dance, Josh O'Connor, Geraldine Chaplin, Michael Maloney, Emerald Fennell, and Andrew Buchan. John Lithgow and Pip Torrens return in cameo appearances.

== Premise ==
The Crown traces the life of Queen Elizabeth II from her wedding in 1947 through to the early 2000s.

Season three covers the time period between 1964 and 1977, beginning with Harold Wilson's election as prime minister and ending with the Silver Jubilee of Elizabeth II. Events depicted include the unmasking of the Surveyor of the Queen's Pictures, Sir Anthony Blunt as a Soviet spy, Harold Wilson and Edward Heath's respective terms as prime minister, the Aberfan disaster, the Apollo 11 Moon landing, the 1969 Investiture of Prince Charles as Prince of Wales, the death of the Duke of Windsor (the queen's uncle and the former king Edward VIII), the death and state funeral of Winston Churchill, and Princess Margaret's affair with Roddy Llewellyn that leads to divorce from Tony Armstrong-Jones. US president Lyndon B. Johnson and Camilla Shand also feature.

== Cast ==
=== Main ===
- Olivia Colman as Queen Elizabeth II
- Tobias Menzies as Prince Philip, Duke of Edinburgh, Elizabeth's husband
- Helena Bonham Carter as Princess Margaret, Countess of Snowdon, Elizabeth's younger sister
- Ben Daniels as Antony Armstrong-Jones, Earl of Snowdon, known as Lord Snowdon; Princess Margaret's husband
- Jason Watkins as Harold Wilson, Prime Minister of the United Kingdom
- Marion Bailey as Queen Elizabeth the Queen Mother, King George VI's widow and Elizabeth II's mother
- Erin Doherty as Princess Anne, Elizabeth and Philip's second child and only daughter
- Charles Dance as Lord Mountbatten, Philip's ambitious uncle and brother of Princess Alice of Battenberg
- Josh O'Connor as Charles, Prince of Wales, Elizabeth and Philip's eldest child and the heir apparent

==== Featured ====
The following actors are credited in the opening titles of up to two episodes:

- John Lithgow as Sir Winston Churchill, former prime minister of the United Kingdom
- Clancy Brown as Lyndon B. Johnson, 36th President of the United States
- Jane Lapotaire as Princess Alice, Philip's mother
- Mark Lewis Jones as Edward Millward, Prince Charles's Welsh tutor
- Tim McMullan as Robin Woods, Dean of Windsor
- Derek Jacobi as Prince Edward, Duke of Windsor, formerly King Edward VIII, who abdicated
- Geraldine Chaplin as Wallis, Duchess of Windsor, the Duke of Windsor's American wife
- Michael Maloney as Edward Heath, Prime Minister of the United Kingdom
- Emerald Fennell as Camilla Shand, Charles's love interest
- Andrew Buchan as Andrew Parker Bowles, Anne's love interest; later Camilla's husband
- Harry Treadaway as Roddy Llewellyn, Margaret's lover

=== Recurring ===
- David Rintoul as Michael Adeane, Baron Adeane, Private Secretary to the Queen
- Charles Edwards as Martin Charteris, Baron Charteris of Amisfield, Assistant Private Secretary to the Queen; later Private Secretary to the Queen
- Michael Thomas as Prince Henry, Duke of Gloucester, Elizabeth's paternal uncle
- Penny Downie as Alice, Duchess of Gloucester, Elizabeth's paternal aunt by marriage
- Alan Gill as Lewis Williams "Winkie" Douglas, close friend of Princess Margaret and former United States Ambassador to the United Kingdom
- Pippa Winslow as Peggy "Blinkie" Douglas, close friend of Princess Margaret and wife of Winkie Douglas
- Mark Dexter as Tony Benn, Postmaster General; later Minister of Technology
- Lorraine Ashbourne as Barbara Castle, Minister for Overseas Development; later Secretary of State for Transport and Secretary of State for Employment
- Aden Gillett as Richard Crossman, Ministry of Housing and Local Government; later Leader of the House of Commons
- Sam Phillips as the Queen's equerry
- Sinéad Matthews as Marcia Williams, Harold Wilson's private secretary
- David Charles as George Thomas, Parliamentary Under-Secretary of State for the Home Department; later Secretary of State for Wales
- Stuart McQuarrie as George Thomson, Minister without portfolio
- Patrick Ryecart as the Duke of Norfolk, Earl Marshal and Chief Butler of England
- Connie M'Gadzah as Sydney Johnson, the Duke of Windsor's valet/footman

=== Notable guests ===
- Samuel West as Sir Anthony Blunt, Surveyor of the Queen's Pictures
- Angus Wright as Sir Martin Furnival Jones, Director-General of MI5
- Paul Hilton as Michael Straight, American magazine publisher, novelist, patron of the arts, and a confessed spy for the KGB
- Teresa Banham as Mary Wilson, wife of Prime Minister Harold Wilson
- Anthony Brophy as James Jesus Angleton, chief of CIA Counterintelligence
- Michael Simkins as Sir Patrick Dean, British Ambassador to the United States
- Martin McDougall as W. Marvin Watson, advisor to US president Lyndon B. Johnson
- Suzanne Kopser as Lady Bird Johnson, First Lady of the United States
- Pip Torrens as Sir Tommy Lascelles, Private Secretary to King George VI (in flashbacks)
- Verity Russell as young Elizabeth
- Beau Gadsdon as young Margaret
- Richard Harrington as Fred Phillips
- Gwyneth Keyworth as Gwen Edwards, mother of Rhys Edwards
- Colin Morgan as John Armstrong, a Guardian journalist
- Miltos Yerolemou as Chronos
- Nigel Whitmey as Marquis Childs, American journalist, syndicated columnist, and author
- Colin Stinton as Lawrence E. Spivak, American publisher and journalist
- Finn Elliot as young Philip
- Leonie Benesch as Princess Cecilie, Philip's third sister (in flashback)
- John Hollingworth as Lord Porchester, nicknamed Porchey, Racing Manager to the Queen
- Rupert Vansittart as Cecil Harmsworth King, newspaper publisher
- Julian Glover as Cecil Boyd-Rochfort, Irish thoroughbred racehorse trainer
- Philippe Smolikowski as Alec Head, French horse trainer and breeder
- John Finn as Arthur "Bull" Hancock, owner of thoroughbred racehorses at Claiborne Farm
- Nia Roberts as Silvia Millward, Edward Millward's wife
- David Summer as Thomas Parry, Principal of the University College of Wales Aberystwyth
- Henry Dimbleby as Richard Dimbleby, BBC broadcaster
- Alan David as Ben Bowen Thomas, President of the University College of Wales Aberystwyth
- Henry Pettigrew as Neil Armstrong, the astronaut
- Felix Scott as Buzz Aldrin, the astronaut
- Andrew-Lee Potts as Michael Collins the astronaut
- Sidney Jackson as Prince Edward, Elizabeth and Philip's youngest child
- Marlo Woolley as Prince Andrew, Elizabeth and Philip's second son
- Fred Broom as Cliff Michelmore, English television presenter and producer
- Daniel Beales as Patrick Moore, English amateur astronomer
- Kevin Eldon as Priest Michael
- Matthew Baldwin as Kenneth Harris, The journalist who conducted The Duke and Duchess of Windsor in conversation with Kenneth Harris
- Togo Igawa as Emperor Hirohito, Emperor of Japan
- David Wilmot as Arthur Scargill, president of the Yorkshire branch of the National Union of Mineworkers
- Stephen Riddle as Derek Parker Bowles, Andrew Parker Bowles's father
- Judith Alexander as Ann Parker Bowles, Andrew Parker Bowles's mother
- Robert Benedetti-Hall as Major Bruce Shand, Camilla Shand's father
- Nesba Crenshaw as Rosalind Shand, Camilla Shand's mother
- Louis Zegrean as young Edward "Ted" Heath
- Richard Walsh as Joe Gormley, president of the National Union of Mineworkers
- Jessica De Gouw as Lucy Lindsay-Hogg, girlfriend of Lord Snowdon; later Lucy, Countess of Snowdon
- Nancy Carroll as Lady Anne Tennant, lady-in-waiting to Princess Margaret and wife of Colin Tennant
- Richard Teverson as Colin Tennant, husband of Lady Anne Tennant
- Martin Wimbush as Sir Ronald Bodley Scott, English haematologist and expert on therapy for leukaemia and lymphoma
- Dan Skinner as Alastair Burnet, British journalist and broadcaster
- Tim Bentinck as Sir John Betjeman, Poet Laureate of the United Kingdom

== Episodes ==
No. overall	No. in season	Title	Directed by	Written by	Original release date
21	1	"Olding"	Benjamin Caron	Peter Morgan	17 November 2019
In October 1964, as Britain welcomes new Prime Minister Harold Wilson, Elizabeth hears rumours that Wilson is working for the KGB under the alias "Olding". She rebuffs them as gossip but learns from a dying Winston Churchill that he was suspicious of Wilson during his time as Prime Minister. Margaret, now Countess of Snowdon, suffers a failing marriage to Tony. The following year, while at Churchill's funeral, Elizabeth witnesses Wilson engage in conversation with Russians. In Washington, D.C., a sleeper agent informs the Department of Justice of a KGB mole inside Buckingham Palace. Elizabeth later discovers that her art advisor, Sir Anthony Blunt, is the mole but decides to keep the truth secret for fear of reputational damage. Philip confronts Blunt and finds he knows about the Profumo affair.
22	2	"Margaretology"	Benjamin Caron	Peter Morgan	17 November 2019
In 1965, Margaret and Tony embark on a tour of the United States, visiting cities along the West Coast and staying with an Arizona family before attending Tony's book launch in New York. In the UK, Wilson tells Elizabeth that the country needs a financial bailout from President Lyndon B. Johnson, and invites him to come to Britain to discuss the issue. After three failed attempts, Wilson concludes that Johnson declines because the United Kingdom did not support America in the Vietnam War. At the last minute, Johnson invites Margaret to a private dinner at the White House, where her informality and sense of fun persuades him to help with the bailout. Philip later advises Elizabeth not to give her any more responsibilities.
23	3	"Aberfan"	Benjamin Caron	Peter Morgan	17 November 2019
In October 1966, following the Aberfan disaster, Elizabeth decides not to visit the village, despite Wilson's attempts to convince her to go. Philip attends the funeral of the children who died. The public blames the National Coal Board for the disaster before blame shifts toward the government. Hearing suggestions that she is not being sympathetic, Elizabeth confronts Wilson, who says this came from someone in his cabinet. Elizabeth later visits Aberfan, laying flowers on the graves and visiting grieving families. In private, she cries while listening to a recording of the hymn sung at the children's funeral.
24	4	"Bubbikins"	Benjamin Caron	Peter Morgan	17 November 2019
Elizabeth learns that Princess Alice, who has been living in Athens, Greece, is in danger from the recent imposition of military rule. She arranges for Alice to come and stay at Buckingham Palace, despite Philip's protests. As Elizabeth and Anne look after Alice, the royal family participates in a documentary to show the public they are normal people. Critics rebuff the documentary, prompting Philip to arrange an interview for Anne with Guardian reporter John Armstrong. However, Armstrong interviews Alice instead, and the subsequent article is a success, resulting in Philip making amends with his mother.
25	5	"Coup"	Christian Schwochow	Peter Morgan	17 November 2019
In 1967, Elizabeth and Porchey travel to France and America to learn about modern methods of racehorse breeding and training, while Wilson finally decides to devalue the pound. Cecil Harmsworth King meets Lord Mountbatten, and proposes a plan to replace Wilson. Mountbatten is attracted by the idea, but raises concerns about whether it is practicable. Wilson calls Elizabeth to raise his suspicions. Elizabeth scolds Mountbatten, who at her urging, visits Alice to discuss old age and their lack of identity as Mountbattens.
26	6	"Tywysog Cymru"	Christian Schwochow	James Graham & Peter Morgan	17 November 2019
On advice from Wilson, Elizabeth sends Charles, who has found happiness and a taste for amateur dramatics at Cambridge, to Wales to learn Welsh before his investiture as Prince of Wales. He befriends tutor Tedi Millward and becomes sympathetic to his Welsh nationalism. Charles's decision to include statements in his speech expressing support for Wales, irritates Elizabeth. Charles requests a meeting with his mother, hoping for appreciation or even affection, but receives neither; he is told he must suppress his personal opinions. Charles returns to Cambridge and stars in a performance of Richard II, where Anne is in attendance.
27	7	"Moondust"	Jessica Hobbs	Peter Morgan	17 November 2019
In 1969, during the first Moon landing, Philip starts feeling dissatisfied with his lack of achievement and searches for inspiration. When Neil Armstrong, Michael Collins, and Buzz Aldrin visit Britain as part of their world tour, Philip arranges a private interview. Asking them what being on the Moon was like, he is disappointed by their mundane answers and their elementary questions about palace life. Philip later complains about the Dean of Windsor, prompting Elizabeth to have the Dean retire and name Robin Woods his successor. Woods invites Philip to take part in the religious academy he has opened in the castle grounds. Philip tells the group he has lost his faith following his mother's recent death, and asks for their help in restoring it.
28	8	"Dangling Man"	Sam Donovan	David Hancock & Peter Morgan	17 November 2019
Charles is in a love triangle with Andrew Parker Bowles and his girlfriend Camilla Shand. Anne has an affair with Parker Bowles. Elizabeth meets the Duke of Windsor before his death; they reflect upon the circumstances that led to her becoming Queen. He asks for forgiveness, but she remarks that she is sometimes thankful that he abdicated. He gives her Charles’s letters to him, which she reads with concern. Edward Heath becomes Prime Minister following the 1970 general election.
29	9	"Imbroglio"	Sam Donovan	Peter Morgan	17 November 2019
Electricity supply is being rationed because of the miners' strike. Charles trains at Dartmouth. Lord Mountbatten and the Queen Mother succeed in stopping the relationship between Charles and Camilla – Charles is posted overseas in the Caribbean for eight months. After the Queen Mother talks to the parents of Parker Bowles and Camilla, they get married. The Queen hears from Anne about her affair with Parker Bowles and her belief that Camilla is destined for him, not Charles.
30	10	"Cri de Coeur"	Jessica Hobbs	Peter Morgan	17 November 2019
After her marriage continues to fall apart, Margaret is introduced to Roddy Llewellyn, and they begin a relationship. They visit the Caribbean, where they are photographed together; the pictures are printed in the newspapers. Elizabeth calls them back to Britain based on advice from her mother. Amidst turnover in Parliament, Margaret attempts suicide, although after Elizabeth visits her, they bond again and talk about her failed marriage and their age. Britain celebrates Elizabeth’s Silver Jubilee, marking her 25th anniversary as sovereign on 7 June 1977.

== Production ==
=== Development ===
By October 2017, early production had begun on an anticipated third and fourth season, and by the following January, Netflix confirmed the series had been renewed for a third and fourth season.

=== Casting ===
The producers recast some roles with older actors every two seasons, as the characters age. In October 2017, Olivia Colman was cast as Queen Elizabeth II for the third and fourth seasons. By January 2018, Helena Bonham Carter and Paul Bettany were in negotiations to portray Princess Margaret and Prince Philip, respectively, for these seasons. However, by the end of the month Bettany was forced to drop out due to the time commitment required. By the end of March 2018, Tobias Menzies was cast as Philip. In early May 2018, Bonham Carter was confirmed to have been cast, alongside Jason Watkins as Prime Minister Harold Wilson. The next month, Ben Daniels was cast as Tony Armstrong-Jones for the third season, along with Erin Doherty as Princess Anne. A month later, Josh O'Connor and Marion Bailey were cast as respectively Prince Charles and the Queen Mother. In October 2018, Emerald Fennell was cast as Camilla Shand. In December 2018, Charles Dance was cast as Louis Mountbatten.

=== Filming ===
The third season began filming in July 2018.

=== Music ===
The Crown: Season Three

Soundtrack album by Martin Phipps
- Released: 22 November 2019
- Genre: Soundtrack
- Length: 48:08
- Label: Sony Music

Martin Phipps soundtrack chronology
The Aftermath (2019)	The Crown: Season Three (2019)	The Crown: Season Four (2020)

No.	Title	Length
1.	"New Queen"	3:56
2.	"Black Widow"	2:01
3.	"The Establishment"	2:58
4.	"Charles"	2:23
5.	"Aberfan"	6:14
6.	"Sisters"	3:00
7.	"Philip"	3:03
8.	"Simple Harp"	2:29
9.	"Stretched Choir"	2:13
10.	"Bodies"	3:41
11.	"Roddy"	3:05
12.	"Princess"	1:53
13.	"Mountbatten"	1:40
14.	"Alice"	2:40
15.	"Man on the Moon"	4:09
16.	"Better for Everyone"	2:37
Total length:		48:08

== Release ==
The third season was released on Netflix worldwide in its entirety on 17 November 2019, and consists of ten episodes.

== Reception ==
Rotten Tomatoes reported a 90% approval rating for the third season based on 102 reviews, with an average rating of 8.50/10. Its critical consensus reads: "Olivia Colman shines, but as The Crown marches on in reliably luxurious fashion through time it finds space for the characters around her, providing ample opportunity for the appealing ensemble to gleam, too." On Metacritic, the season holds a score of 84 out of 100 based on 30 critics, indicating "universal acclaim".

Writing for The Daily Telegraph, Anita Singh called the series "by far, the best soap opera on television". The Los Angeles Times's Lorraine Ali praised the attention to historical detail and the performances, particularly from Colman and Bonham Carter. The Guardian's Lucy Mangan praised the "top-notch performances", adding that the season is "so confident and so precision-engineered that you don't notice the defects". Daniel Fienberg for The Hollywood Reporter judged the cast transition to be a success, adding the series "remains a model for carefully crafted episodic storytelling".

There was some criticism of the lack of nuance within the writing. The BBC's Hugh Montgomery found it "increasingly on the nose", with the season "the best yet". Alison Rowat from The Herald opined some scenes were "over-engineered" and dialogue "too on the nose", but nevertheless that it excels as a political drama. Vulture's Jen Chaney found the writing "a bit heavy-handed" in nevertheless "an absorbing, thoroughly enriching experience". Reviewing for Variety, Caroline Framke thought the series does not always succeed in humanising the royal family, but when it does, it is "as compelling a portrait of how power warps individuals, and the world along with them, as exists on TV".

Ed Power from The Independent was less complimentary, praising Colman's performance but finding the series somewhat "colourless".

== Historical accuracy ==
The Queen did not visit Churchill following his final stroke. Writer Hugo Vickers claims that by then he was senile and incapable of holding a conversation. Anthony Blunt's exposure as a Soviet spy also drew criticism. Vickers noted that the episode did not mention that he was publicly exposed in 1979 and stripped of his knighthood, while also noting that he never resided at Buckingham Palace and ridiculing a scene in which he discusses his exposure with Prince Philip in an attempt to blackmail the royal family.

The depiction of the relationship with President Johnson has been criticised. It has been suggested that he did not refuse to attend Churchill's funeral, in response to Wilson's refusal to support the Vietnam War, but that he was genuinely unable due to poor health. His disappointment with Wilson's views on Vietnam had developed much later. Historians also denied the episode's implication that no US president had ever been to Balmoral; Eisenhower had visited Balmoral while president in 1959. Critics noted that the episode did not mention that Johnson had been the only president since Truman never to have met the Queen. The implication that Johnson did not know who Princess Margaret was before her visit to America was also criticised. The Princess did attend a White House dinner, but the details are mostly fictional (such as her carousing with Johnson and kissing him, dirty limericks, and helping secure a US bailout, which in fact had already been negotiated). The depiction of Princess Margaret and President Johnson publicly insulting the late president Kennedy during the same White House dinner was seen as highly unlikely since members of the Kennedy family, as well as John Connally, who was riding with Kennedy during the assassination, were reportedly among those who attended the dinner.

The relationship with Princess Alice has also drawn criticism for Prince Philip's depiction as being estranged from his mother and objecting to her visiting London. In reality, he visited her regularly and often transported her by plane, and her depicted interview with a journalist from The Guardian never happened. Vickers also stated that the same episode ignored that Prince Philip encouraged her to move to London permanently.

Prince Charles did visit the Duke of Windsor in Paris in 1972, although the depiction of the letters concerning his affections for Camilla was criticised: the Prince and Camilla had met, but were not intimately close during the Duke's lifetime. The Queen did visit the Duke ten days before his death, but this had been long-planned and not requested at short notice. Simpson was not with the Duke when he died.

The timeframe of Woods's posting as Dean of Windsor around the time of the Apollo 11 spaceflight and lunar landing in July 1969 is inaccurate, as he had taken the role in 1962. Prince William of Gloucester had also died five years before the Queen's Silver Jubilee.

It has been suggested that there was no plot by the palace to prevent Prince Charles and Camilla's marriage, with Camilla's love for Andrew Parker Bowles being genuine, and Prince Charles unable to decide. It has also been suggested that Princess Anne's relations with Andrew Parker Bowles did not overlap with Prince Charles and Camilla's introduction. Reviews of the episode noted that it ignored more significant events, citing Princess Anne's 1973 wedding to Captain Mark Phillips and her attempted kidnapping in 1974.
