= James E. Webb =

American government official (1906–1992)

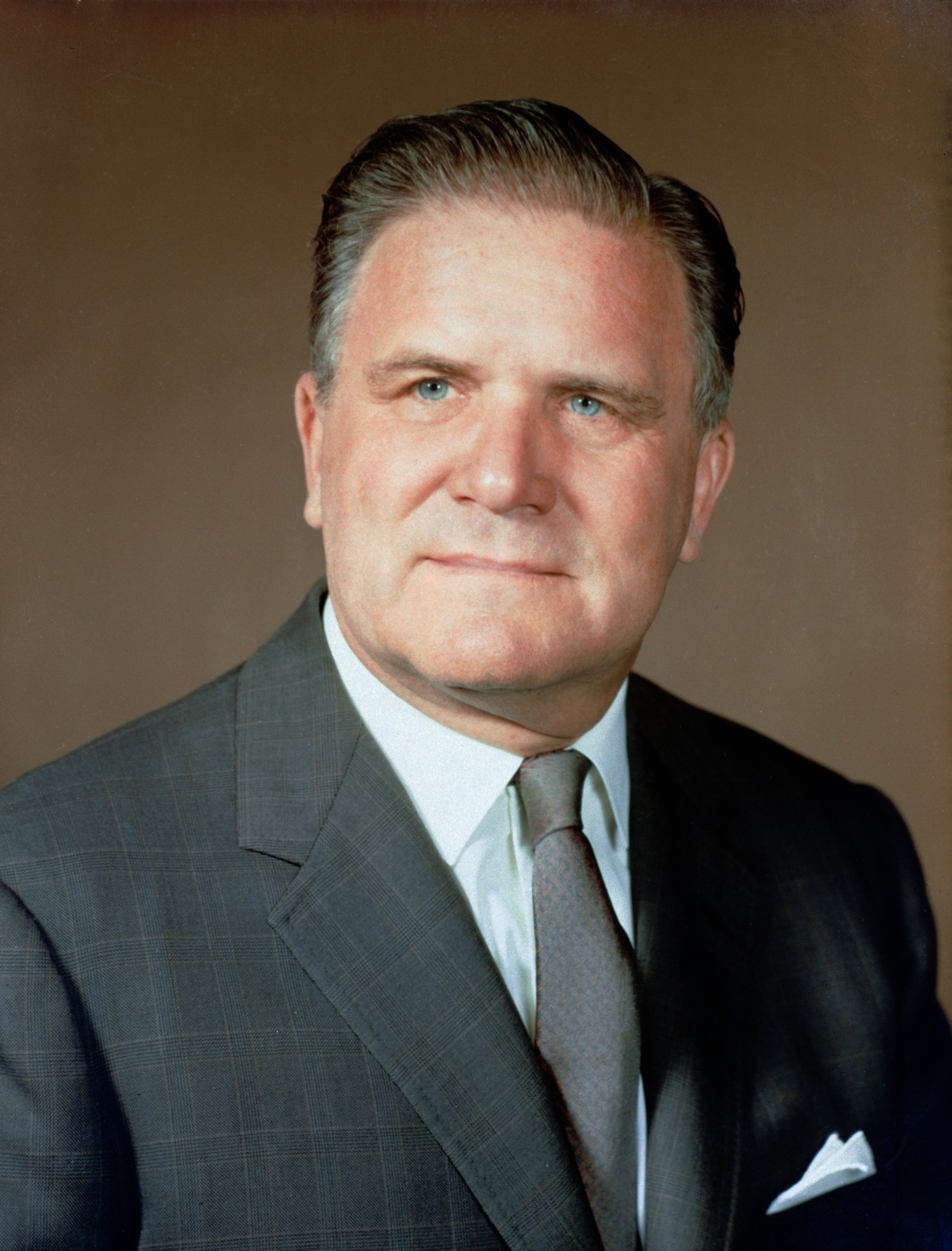
- Official portrait, 1966

2nd Administrator of the National Aeronautics and Space Administration
- In office February 14, 1961 – October 7, 1968
- President: John F. Kennedy; Lyndon B. Johnson
- Deputy: Hugh Dryden; Robert Seamans; Thomas O. Paine
- Preceded by: T. Keith Glennan
- Succeeded by: Thomas O. Paine

16th United States Under Secretary of State
- In office January 28, 1949 – February 29, 1952
- President: Harry S. Truman
- Preceded by: Robert A. Lovett
- Succeeded by: David Bruce

7th Director of the Bureau of the Budget
- In office July 13, 1946 – January 27, 1949
- President: Harry S. Truman
- Preceded by: Harold D. Smith
- Succeeded by: Frank Pace

Personal details
- Born: James Edwin Webb; October 7, 1906 Tally Ho, North Carolina, U.S. (now Stem)
- Died: March 27, 1992 (aged 85) Washington, D.C., U.S.
- Resting place: Arlington National Cemetery
- Party: Democratic
- Spouse: Patsy Aiken Douglas (m. 1938)
- Children: 2
- Education: University of North Carolina, Chapel Hill (BA); George Washington University (JD)

Military service
- Allegiance: United States
- Branch/service: United States Marine Corps
- Years of service: 1930–1932; 1944–1945
- Rank: Lieutenant colonel

James Edwin Webb (October 7, 1906 – March 27, 1992) was an American government official who served as Undersecretary of State from 1949 to 1952. He was the second administrator of NASA from February 14, 1961, to October 7, 1968. Webb led NASA from the beginning of the Kennedy administration through the end of the Johnson administration, thus overseeing each of the critical first crewed missions throughout the Mercury and Gemini programs until days before the launch of the first Apollo mission. He also dealt with the Apollo 1 fire. He helped found the National Academy of Public Administration, a key locus for governmental reform studies.

In 2002, the Next Generation Space Telescope was renamed the James Webb Space Telescope as a tribute to Webb.

== Early and personal life ==
Webb was born in 1906 in Tally Ho in Granville County, North Carolina. His father, John Frederick Webb, was superintendent of Granville County's segregated public schools. Sarah Gorham Webb was his mother. He completed his college education at the University of North Carolina at Chapel Hill, where he received a Bachelor of Arts in education in 1928. He was a member of the Acacia fraternity. Webb became a second lieutenant in the United States Marine Corps, and he served as a Marine Corps pilot on active duty from 1930 to 1932. Webb then studied law at The George Washington University Law School, where he received a J.D. degree in 1936. In the same year, he was admitted to the Bar of the District of Columbia.

Webb married Patsy Aiken Douglas in 1938, and they had two children.

== Career ==
=== U.S. House of Representatives staff ===
Webb began his long career in public service in Washington, D.C., by serving as secretary to U.S. Representative Edward W. Pou of North Carolina from 1932 to 1934. Pou was chairman of the Rules Committee and Dean of the House. With Webb's assistance, Pou was influential in pushing through the first legislation of Franklin D. Roosevelt's New Deal during the first hundred days of Roosevelt's term. In addition to his secretarial duties, Webb provided physical assistance to the aging and ailing Pou.

=== Assistant to private attorney ===
Webb next served as an assistant in the office of Oliver Max Gardner, an attorney, former governor of North Carolina and friend of President Roosevelt, from 1934 to 1936. Gardner supported Webb in finishing law school.

During the Air Mail scandal of 1934, the government halted the carrying of airmail by private airline companies. A group of airline executives, led by Thomas Morgan, the President of the Sperry Gyroscope Company in Brooklyn, hired Gardner's firm to represent them. The successful resolution resulted in the resumption of contracts with private airlines.

=== Personnel director for Sperry Gyroscope ===
As a result of their interactions, Sperry Gyroscope hired Webb as the personnel director and assistant to Thomas Morgan, the president of Sperry. Between 1936 and 1944, Webb became the secretary-treasurer and later the vice president of Sperry. During his tenure, Sperry expanded from 800 employees to more than 33,000 and became a major supplier of navigation equipment and airborne radar systems during World War II.

=== Marine re-enlistment ===
Although he wished to re-enlist in the Marines at the start of the war, Webb was deferred because of the importance of his work at Sperry to the war effort. He reentered the Marine Corps on February 1, 1944 and soon became the commanding officer of Marine Air Warning Group One, 9th Marine Aircraft Wing, first as a captain and later as a major. Webb's brother, Henry Gorham Webb, was also a Marine Corps officer who was at that time a prisoner of war in Japan, having served with VMF-211 during the Battle of Wake Island, and then subsequently captured.

He was put in charge of a radar program for the invasion of the Japanese mainland. He had orders to leave for Japan on August 14, 1945, but his orders were delayed, and the Surrender of Japan on September 2, 1945, meant that he did not see combat.

=== Bureau of the Budget ===
After World War II, Webb returned to Washington, DC and served as executive assistant to Gardner, now the Undersecretary of the Treasury, for a short while before he was named as the director of the Bureau of the Budget in the Office of the President of the United States, a position that he held until 1949. Webb was recommended for the appointment to Harry S. Truman by Gardner and Treasury Secretary John Snyder. Because of Webb's association with the Treasury Department, his appointment was seen as subordinating the BoB to the Treasury. His appointment surprised Webb, who had not been told of the final decision to appoint him.

The Bureau of the Budget prepared the President's proposed budget each year for presentation to Congress. Truman's objective for the budget was to bring it to balance after the large expenditures of World War II.

=== State Department ===
President Truman next nominated Webb to serve as an undersecretary of state in the U.S. Department of State, which he began in January 1949. Webb's first assignment from Secretary Dean Acheson was to reorganize the department, adding 12 new presidential appointees and reducing the power of subordinate officers. Webb also consolidated the flow of foreign policy information and intelligence through the secretariat. When President Truman signed the bill codifying the reorganization on May 26, 1949, the department, which had been losing power and influence to the military, strengthened its ties to the President.

A question facing the Department of State at the time was whether the Soviet Union could be contained through only diplomatic means or whether the military would be needed. Paul Nitze, as Director of Policy Planning, wrote a classified memo, NSC 68, arguing for a military build-up of NATO forces. Although Secretary of Defense Louis A. Johnson opposed an increase in the Defense budget, Webb got Truman to convince him to support the recommendations of NSC 68.

On June 25, 1950, the North Korean Army invaded South Korea. Webb and Secretary Acheson devised three recommendations: involve the United Nations, send the Navy Pacific Fleet into the Yellow Sea, and authorize an Air Force strike on the Korean tanks. Truman implemented the first two recommendations immediately but delayed the use of force by several days. The Defense Department was blamed for the lack of U.S. preparedness, and Johnson tried to blame Acheson. Webb worked with his contacts in Congress and others to convince Truman to replace Johnson, and George Marshall was called out of retirement to become the new Secretary of Defense.

In 1950, Webb established an alliance with university scientists, Project Troy, to bolster the United States' psychological warfare capabilities, in particular studying how to circumvent Soviet attempts to jam Voice of America broadcasts.

With the attention of the department focused on the Korean War, Webb's influence weakened. As the author of NSC 68, State Department Director of Policy Planning Paul Nitze became the principal advisor to Secretary Acheson, and a misunderstanding between Webb and Nitze led to Nitze outwardly calling for Webb's resignation, but the rift eventually blew over. Webb started suffering from migraines and resigned in 1952.

Webb left Washington for a position in the Kerr-McGee Oil Corp. in Oklahoma City, but he was still active in government circles, for instance in serving on the Draper Committee in 1958.

=== NASA ===
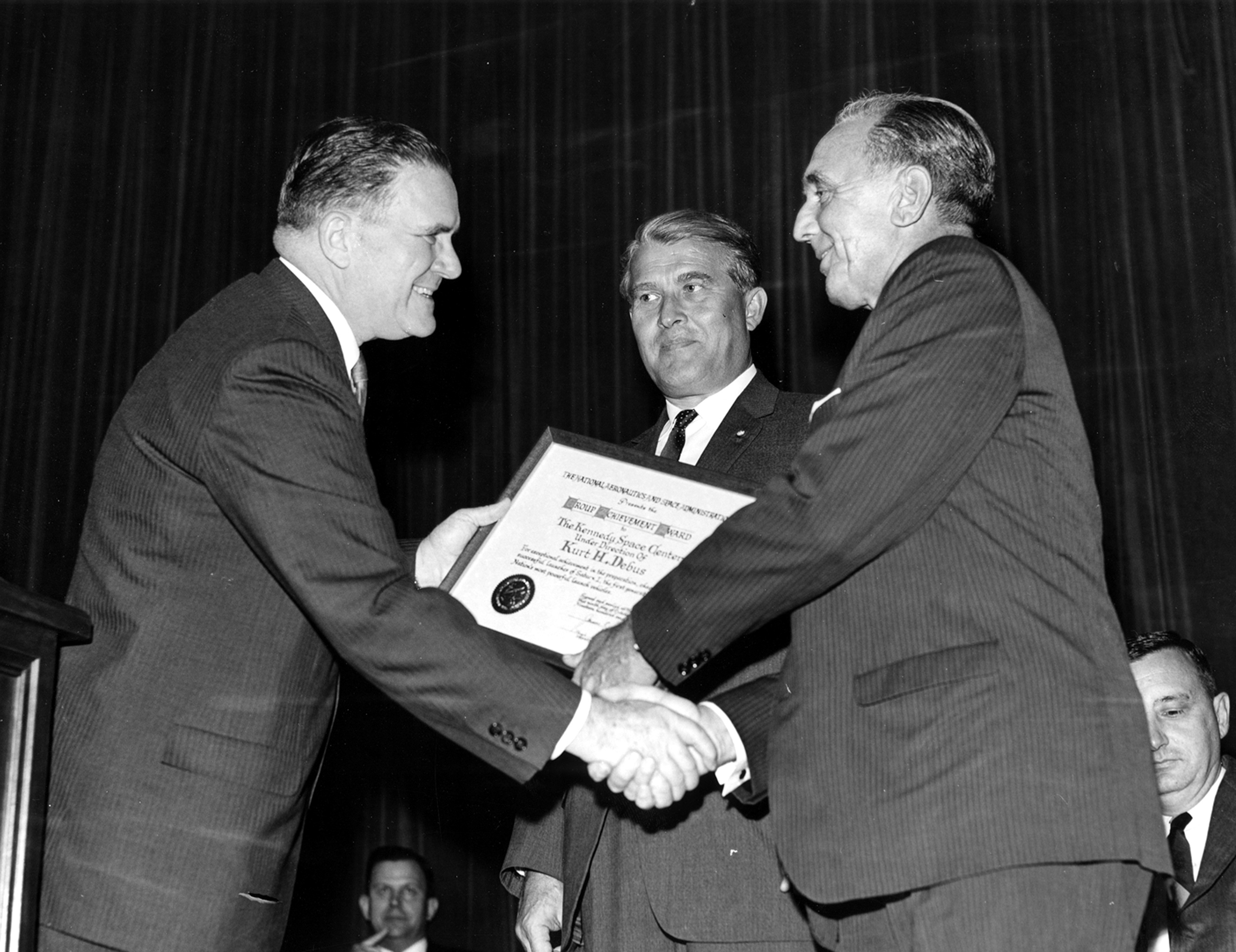
Webb presents NASA's Group Achievement Award to Kennedy Space Center Director Kurt H. Debus, while Wernher von Braun (center) looks on.

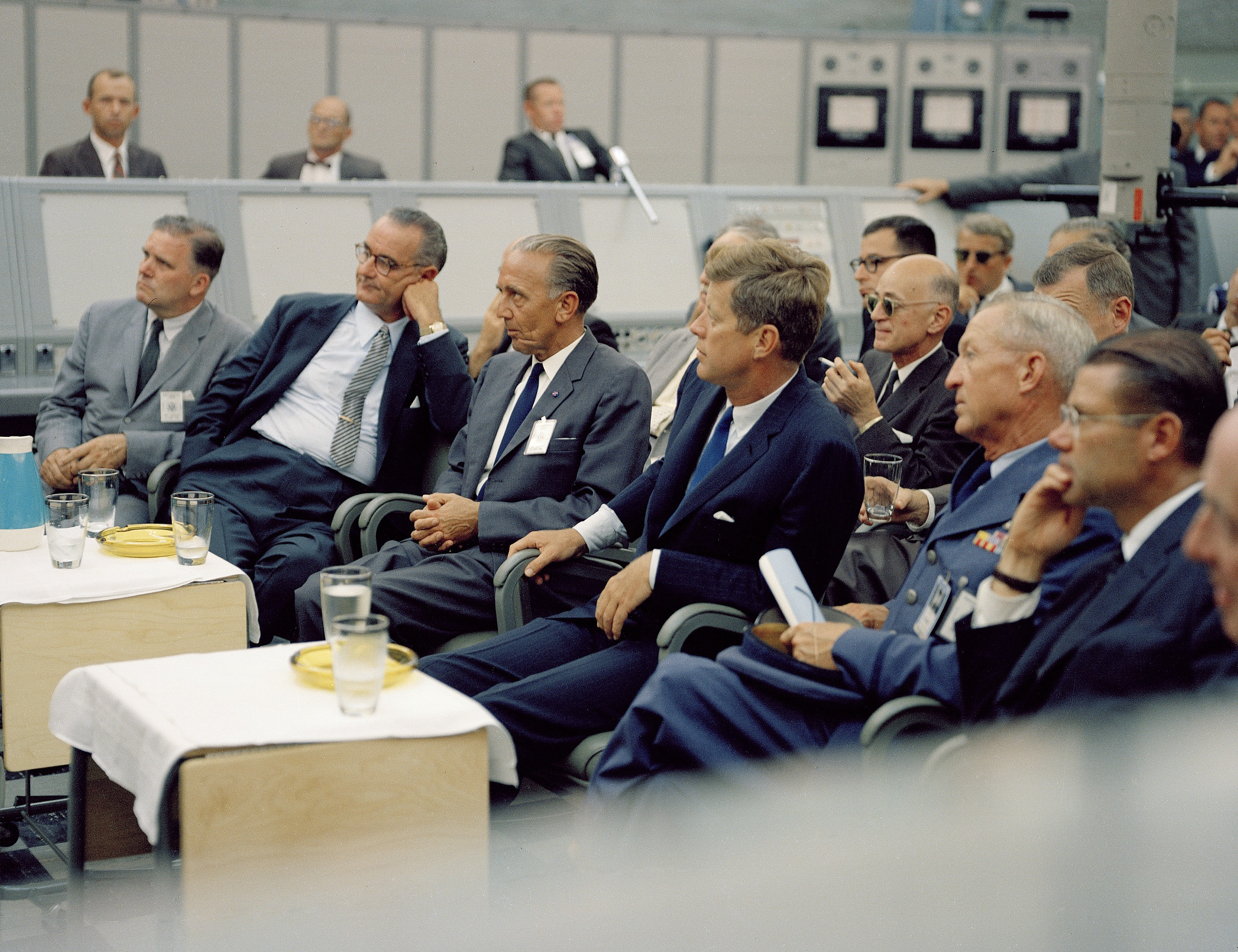
Webb, Vice President Lyndon Johnson, Kurt H. Debus, and President John F. Kennedy receive a briefing on Saturn I launch operations during a tour of Launch Complex 34, September 1962.

On February 14, 1961, Webb accepted President John F. Kennedy's appointment as administrator of NASA, taking the reins from interim director, Deputy Administrator Hugh L. Dryden. Webb directed NASA's undertaking of the goal set by Kennedy of landing an American on the Moon before the end of the 1960s through the Apollo program. For seven years after Kennedy's announcement on May 25, 1961, of the goal of a crewed lunar landing, Webb lobbied for support for NASA in Congress, until he left NASA in October 1968. As a longtime Washington insider and with the backing of President Lyndon B. Johnson, he was able to produce continued support and resources for Apollo.

During Webb's administration, NASA developed from a loose collection of research centers to a coordinated organization. He had a key role in creating the Manned Spacecraft Center, later the Johnson Space Center, in Houston. Despite the pressures to focus on the Apollo program, Webb ensured that NASA carried out a program of planetary exploration with the Mariner and Pioneer space programs. Webb was an early champion of space telescopes, like the one that would later bear his name.

Encouraged by Kennedy and Johnson, Webb made racial integration a priority for the agency. NASA publicly supported the Civil Rights Act of 1964 and initiated a series of innovative programs aimed at increasing black participation including specifically targeting black colleges and schools with recruitment programs. On one occasion Webb and Wernher von Braun famously confronted and lectured segregationist Alabama Governor George Wallace on racial integration in front of the press. NASA had the worst black representation of any government agency in 1961, but by the time Webb stepped down, it was the best and considered the model for other government agencies on racial integration.

After the Apollo 1 accident in 1967, Webb told the media, "We've always known that something like this was going to happen sooner or later... Who would have thought that the first tragedy would be on the ground?" Webb went to Johnson and asked for NASA to be allowed to handle the accident investigation and to direct its recovery, according to a procedure that was established following the in-flight accident on Gemini 8 (1966). He promised to be truthful in assessing blame regarding Apollo 1, even to himself and NASA management, as appropriate. The agency set out to discover the details of the tragedy, to correct problems, and to continue progress toward the Apollo 11 lunar landing. Webb reported the investigation board's findings to various congressional committees and took personal blame at nearly every meeting. Whether by happenstance or by design, Webb managed to deflect some of the backlash over the accident away from both NASA as an agency and from the Johnson administration. As a result, NASA's image and popular support were largely undamaged.

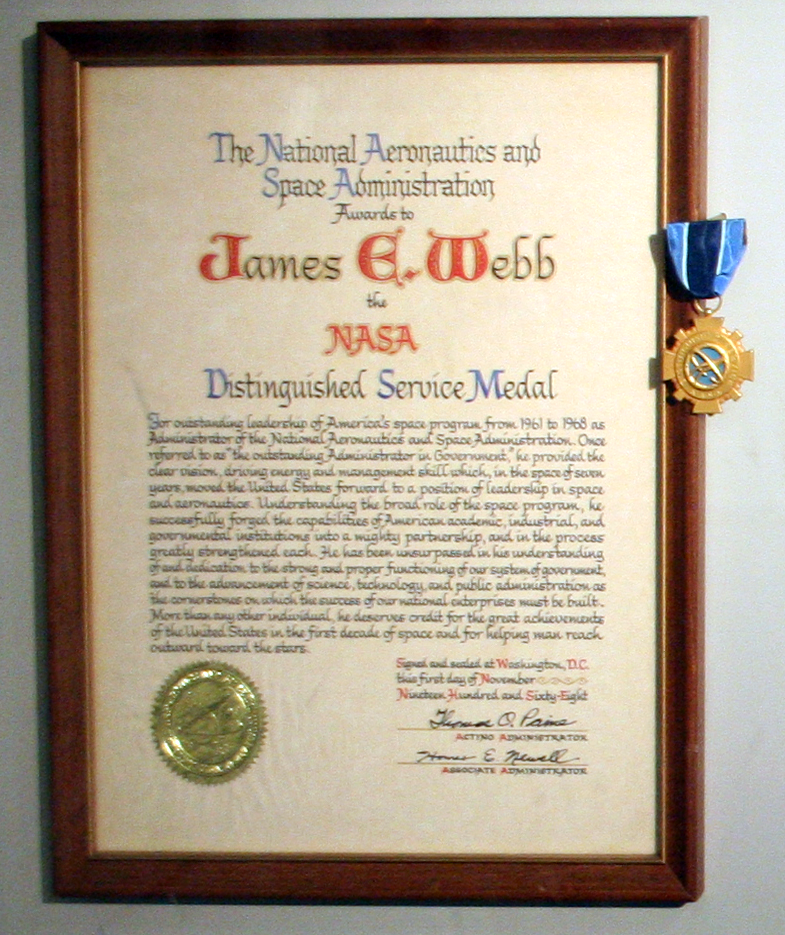
NASA Distinguished Service Award/Medal, November 1, 1968

Webb was informed by CIA sources in 1968 that the Soviet Union was developing its own heavy N1 rocket for a crewed lunar mission, and he directed NASA to prepare Apollo 8 for a possible lunar orbital mission that year. At the time, Webb's assertions about the Soviet Union's abilities were doubted by some people, and the N-1 was dubbed "Webb's Giant". However, after the collapse of the Soviet Union, revelations about the Soviet Moonshot have given support to Webb's conclusion.

Webb was a Democrat tied closely to Johnson, and since Johnson chose not to run for reelection, Webb decided to step down as administrator to allow the next president, Republican Richard Nixon, to choose his own administrator. Webb left NASA on October 7, 1968, his sixty-second birthday, just before the first crewed flight in the Apollo program.

Drawing on his NASA experience, Webb published Space Age Management: The Large-Scale Approach (1969), in which he presented the space program as a model of successful administration that could be broadened to address major societal problems.

In 1969, Johnson presented Webb with the Presidential Medal of Freedom. Webb is also a 1976 recipient of the Langley Gold Medal from the Smithsonian Institution.

== Later life and death ==
After retiring from NASA, Webb remained in Washington, DC, serving on several advisory boards, including serving as a regent of the Smithsonian Institution. In 1981, he was awarded the Sylvanus Thayer Award by the U.S. Military Academy at West Point for his dedication to his country.

Webb died from a heart attack at Georgetown University Hospital in Washington on March 27, 1992, at age 85. He was buried in Arlington National Cemetery.

== Legacy ==
Webb was played by Dan Lauria in the 1998 miniseries From the Earth to the Moon, and by Ken Strunk in the 2016 film Hidden Figures.

NASA's James Webb Space Telescope (JWST), originally known as the Next Generation Space Telescope, was renamed after Webb in 2002. Launched on December 25, 2021, it is considered the successor to the Hubble Space Telescope.

=== Controversy about telescope name ===
In March 2021, a commentary in Scientific American urged NASA to rename the James Webb Space Telescope, accusing Webb of complicity in the State Department's purge of homosexuals from the federal workforce in the 1940s and 1950s, known as the lavender scare. This controversy was reported in the press. The scientists who proposed renaming the telescope pointed to the case of NASA budget analyst Clifford Norton, who was fired after an arrest for making a "homosexual advance." While Webb was head of the agency at the time of Norton's firing, he was not involved with the decision.

Personnel matters fell under the purview of the Deputy Administrator of NASA Robert Seamans; there is no direct evidence that Webb had any knowledge of Norton's firing. Such firings have been claimed to be a "custom within the agency" in that era. Historian David K. Johnson, author of 2004 book The Lavender Scare, has stated that there is no evidence Webb led or instigated any persecution, nor played "any sort of leadership role in the lavender scare". According to astrophysicist Hakeem Oluseyi, the initial accusations that Webb was part of the lavender scare were based on a quote from John Peurifoy (who, like Webb, had the rank of "Undersecretary of State") which was wrongly attributed to Webb.

On September 30, 2021, NASA announced that it would keep the JWST name after running an investigation and finding "no evidence at this time that warrants changing the name".

Former administrator Sean O'Keefe, who made the decision to name the telescope after administrator Webb, stated that to suggest that Webb should "be held accountable for that activity when there's no evidence to even hint [that he participated in it] is an injustice".

On October 24, 2022, the Royal Astronomical Society released a statement on the matter, in which they indicated the editorial policy of their journals would be to not spell out Webb's name when referring to the telescope until such time as an investigation was completed and a report made public. Less than a month later, NASA released the report of their investigation and accompanying evidence. The report, based on an examination of more than 50,000 documents, found there was no evidence of wrongdoing by Webb either in his time in the State Department or at NASA. In regard to his time at State, the report mirrors Johnson's earlier findings – Webb played no role in helping the Hoey committee or their agents. With regard to Norton's firing at NASA, the report indicates Webb probably was not told of the incident; it also notes that the policy under which Norton was fired was not a NASA policy but an Executive Order applying to all government agencies, that was not enforced by NASA, but rather the Civil Service Commission, over which Webb had no influence. This led to the Royal Astronomical Society reversing its position.

Political offices
Preceded by Harold D. Smith	Director of the Bureau of the Budget; 1946–1949	Succeeded by Frank Pace
Preceded by Robert A. Lovett	United States Under Secretary of State; 1949–1952	Succeeded by David Bruce
Preceded by Hugh Dryden; Acting	Administrator of the National Aeronautics and Space Administration; 1961–1968	Succeeded by Thomas O. Paine
