= Frank Cyril James =

Canadian academic (1903–1973)

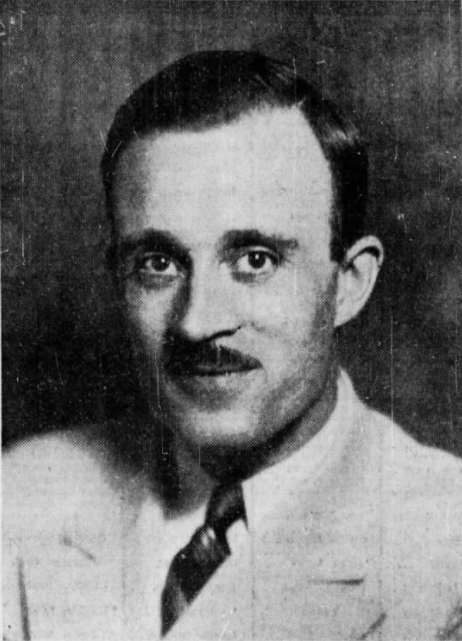

Principal of McGill University
- In office 1940–1962
- Preceded by: Lewis Williams Douglas
- Succeeded by: Rocke Robertson

Personal details
- Born: October 8, 1903 London, England
- Died: May 3, 1973 (aged 69) England

Frank Cyril James (October 8, 1903 – May 3, 1973) was a Canadian academic and principal of McGill University from 1939 to 1962.

== Biography ==
Born in London, England, he won a Sir Ernest Cassel Travelling Scholarship that allowed him to study at the University of Pennsylvania in 1922, where he received his Ph.D. In 1927, he became assistant professor in the Wharton School of Business.

In 1938 he had published the two-volume The Growth of Chicago Banks ( Harper & Bros.), a masterful history of banking in America's second most important banking center.

In 1939, he became the head of the commerce department at McGill University. After becoming friends with the Chancellor, Sir Edward Beatty, he was appointed principal and vice-chancellor in January 1940 and served until 1962. From 1941 he was on the original standing committee of the Foundation for the Study of Cycles.

In 1941 he was appointed to head the Dominion Government's Advisory Committee on Reconstruction, serving until the fall of 1943 when the Committee was terminated.

In 1947, he was awarded an honorary Doctor of Laws from the University of Saskatchewan.

He died in England in 1973.
