= Sharman Douglas =

American socialite (1928–1996)

- Born: October 5, 1928; Hastings-on-Hudson, New York, U.S.
- Died: February 3, 1996 (aged 67); New York Hospital, New York City, U.S.
- Education: Brearley School; Vassar College
- Spouse: Andrew MacKenzie Hay (m. 1968; div. 1977)
- Parent(s): Lewis W. Douglas; Margaret "Peggy" Zinsser

Sharman Douglas (October 5, 1928 – February 3, 1996) was an American socialite known for her friendship with the British royal family, in particular Princess Margaret.

She was the only daughter of chemicals heiress and philanthropist Peggy Zinsser (d. 1992) and politician Lewis W. Douglas (d. 1974), the latter of whom served as an Arizonan congressman, director of the Bureau of the Budget from 1933 until 1934, and U.S. ambassador to the Court of St. James's from 1947 until 1950. It was during these three years in England that she developed her friendship with Princess Margaret and the royal family.

At various times in her life, "Charmin' Sharman", as she was known during her father's tenure as ambassador, worked as a talent agent, a movie publicist, and a public-relations agent. In 1966, New York City mayor John Lindsay named her New York's Commissioner of Public Events.

Linked romantically to the Marquess of Blandford and the Marquess of Milford Haven in the 1950s, she also reportedly had a two-year relationship with the United Kingdom's Princess Margaret, according to Margaret: The Secret Princess, an ITV program broadcast in Britain in February 2003.

Sharman Douglas married Andrew MacKenzie Hay, a food importer, in 1968. They divorced in 1977.

Her first cousin Josalee Douglas was the first wife of Count Jean-François de Chambrun, who later married Raine, Countess Spencer, the stepmother of Diana, Princess of Wales.

Sharman Douglas died of bone cancer at New York Hospital in 1996. Sharman is buried in Locust Valley Cemetery, Locust Valley, New York.
