= Daniel W. Bell =

American civil servant and businessman (1891-1971)

Daniel Bell
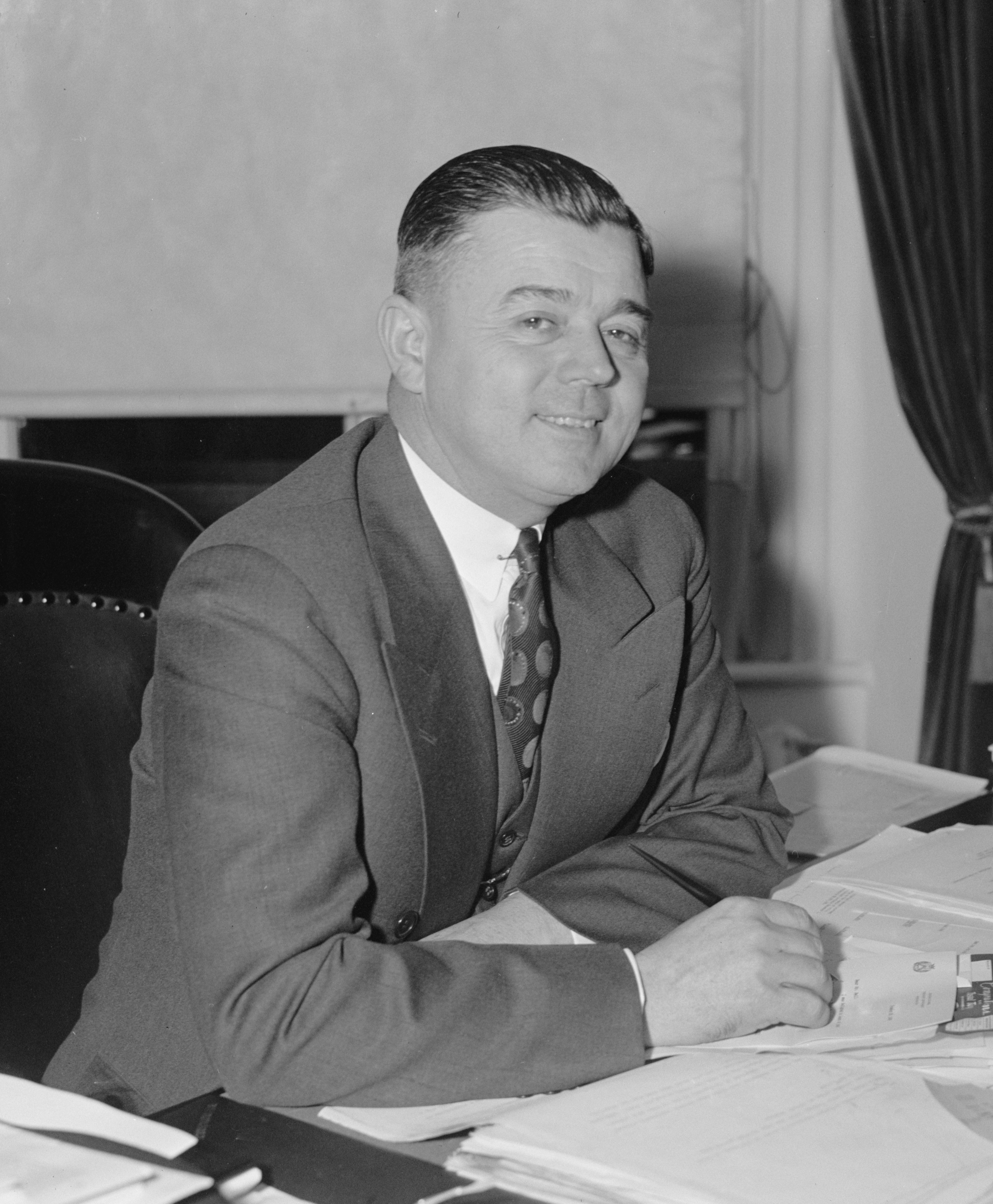

Under Secretary of the Treasury
- In office January 1, 1940 – 1945
- President: Franklin D. Roosevelt
- Preceded by: John W. Hanes II
- Succeeded by: Oliver Max Gardner

5th Director of the Bureau of the Budget
- In office September 1, 1934 – April 14, 1939
- President: Franklin D. Roosevelt
- Preceded by: Lewis Douglas
- Succeeded by: Harold D. Smith

Personal details
- Born: Daniel Wafena Bell; July 23, 1891 Kinderhook, Illinois, U.S.
- Died: October 4, 1971 (aged 80) Washington, D.C., U.S.
- Party: Democratic
- Education: Gem City College (BA); National University (LLB); Southeastern University, Washington, D.C. (MA)

Daniel Wafena Bell (July 23, 1891 – October 4, 1971) was an American civil servant and businessman. Born in Kinderhook, Illinois, he was acting director of the Bureau of the Budget (now the Office of Management and Budget) from September 1, 1934, until April 14, 1939.

He left the post to serve as Undersecretary of the Treasury from 1940 to 1945. Bell negotiated with Colonel Kenneth Nichols for the transfer of silver from the West Point Depository to the Manhattan Project, to substitute for scarce copper in the electromagnets used in the electromagnetic separation process at the Y-12 National Security Complex; eventually about 14,700 tons of silver was used. Nichols initially said he needed six thousand tons of silver, but initially neither of them could convert the weight to troy ounces. When Nichols said What difference does it make how we express the quantity Bell replied Young man, you may think of silver in tons, but the Treasury will always think of silver in troy ounces.

After the Second World War, he became president of American Security and Trust Company. He died in 1971 at the age of 80, in his Washington home.

Political offices
| Preceded by Lewis Douglas | Director of the Bureau of the Budget; 1934–1939 | Succeeded by Harold D. Smith |
