= Harold D. Smith =

American civil servant

Harold Smith
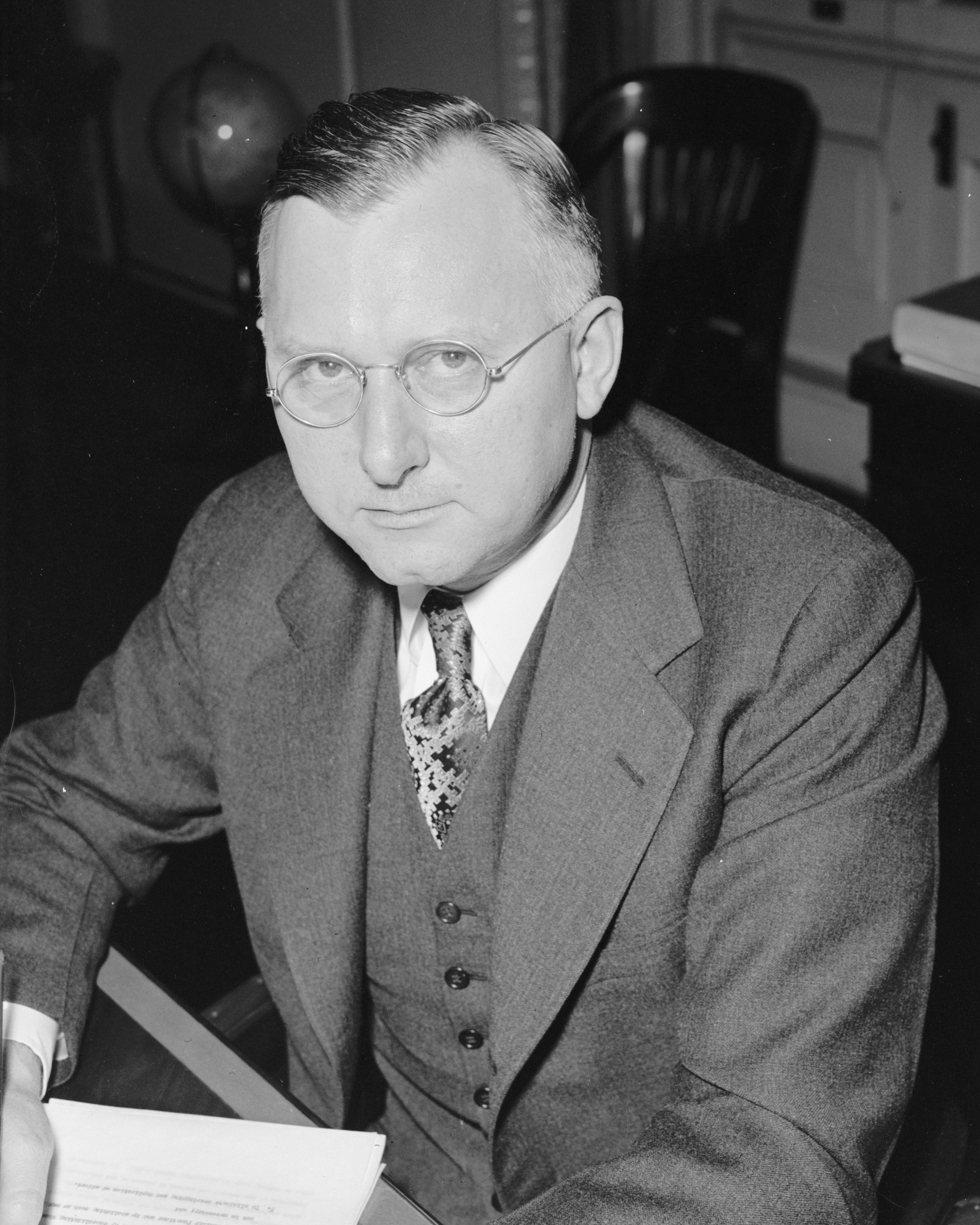

6th Director of the Bureau of the Budget
- In office April 15, 1939 – June 19, 1946
- President: Franklin D. Roosevelt; Harry S. Truman
- Preceded by: Daniel W. Bell
- Succeeded by: James E. Webb

Personal details
- Born: Harold Dewey Smith; June 6, 1898; Haven, Kansas, U.S.
- Died: January 23, 1947 (aged 48); Culpeper, Virginia, U.S.
- Political party: Democratic
- Spouse: Lilian Mayer (1926–1947)
- Education: University of Kansas, Lawrence (BS); University of Michigan, Ann Arbor (MA)

Harold Dewey Smith (June 6, 1898 – January 23, 1947) was an American civil servant who served as director of the United States Bureau of the Budget (now the Office of Management and Budget) during the Second World War.

== Life and career ==
Harold Dewey Smith was born on June 6, 1868.

Born in Haven, Kansas, Smith was the son of James William Smith and his wife, Miranda, née Ebling. After serving in the United States Navy during the First World War, Smith attended the University of Kansas, where he earned a degree in engineering, and the University of Michigan, where he received an A.M. in public administration. Upon graduating from the University of Michigan, Smith returned to Kansas, where he worked for the League of Kansas Municipalities for three years. In 1928, Smith moved back to Michigan to serve as the first director of the Michigan Municipal League. From 1934 until 1937, he was also Director of Government at the University of Michigan.

He was an apprentice seaman in the US Naval Reserve Force.

In 1937, Smith left both the Michigan Municipal League and the University of Michigan to become the Budget Director for the state of Michigan. In 1939, he was selected by President Franklin D. Roosevelt to serve as the Director of the Bureau of the Budget. Smith served in that position for seven years, during which time he handled the enormous expansion of spending resulting from American participation in the Second World War. He resigned from the position in June 1946 to become the vice president of the International Bank for Reconstruction and Development, but died shortly thereafter in Culpeper, Virginia. After his death, his widow donated all of his papers to the Franklin D. Roosevelt Presidential Library and Museum. He is buried in Arlington National Cemetery. His nephew Donald L. Shannon, who died in 1945, was buried next to him and his wife.

He died on January 23, 1947. He was buried in Section 10 EH, Site 11056 at Arlington National Cemetery.

== Works ==
- The Management of Your Government (1945)

Political offices
Preceded by Daniel W. Bell	Director of the Bureau of the Budget; 1939–1946	Succeeded by James E. Webb
Awards and achievements
Preceded by Arthur Harris	Cover of Time; 14 June 1943	Succeeded by Benito Mussolini
