= Clawson Roop =

United States Army general

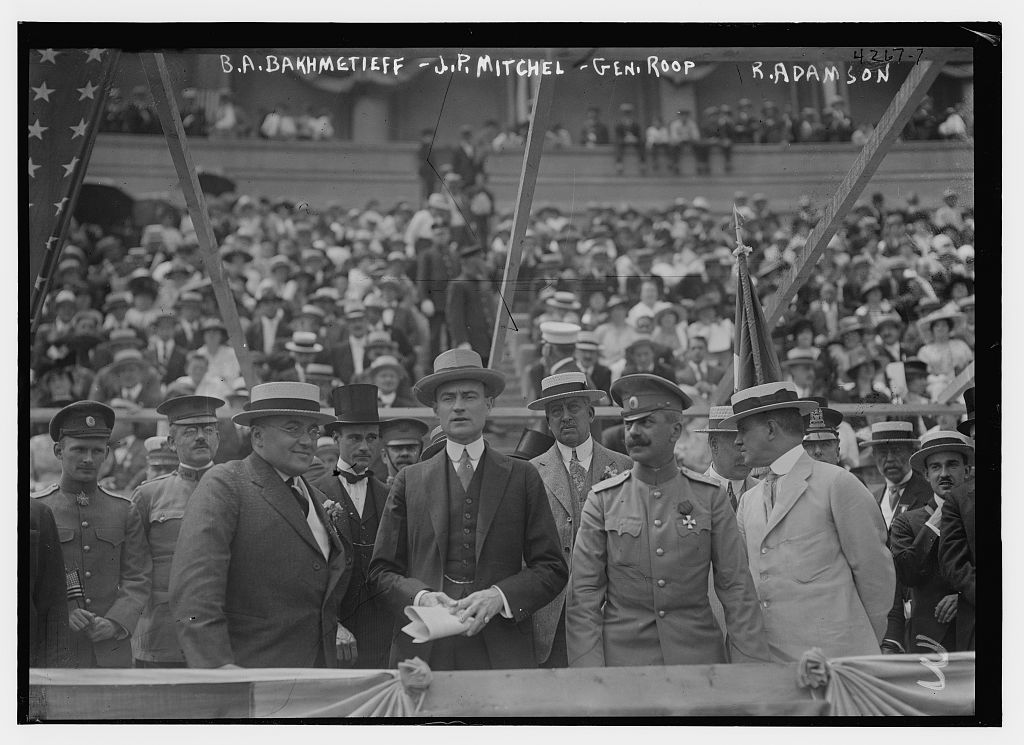

3rd Director of the Bureau of the Budget
- In office August 15, 1929 – March 3, 1933
- President: Herbert Hoover
- Preceded by: Herbert Lord
- Succeeded by: Lewis Douglas

Personal details
- Born: James Clawson Roop; October 3, 1888 Upland, Pennsylvania, U.S.
- Died: January 23, 1972 (aged 83) Fairfield, Connecticut, U.S.
- Party: Republican
- Education: University of Pennsylvania (BS)

Military service
- Allegiance: United States
- Rank: Brigadier General
- Battles/wars: World War II

James Clawson Roop (October 3, 1888 – January 23, 1972) was director of the United States Bureau of the Budget (now the Office of Management and Budget) from August 15, 1929, to March 3, 1933, during the administration of President Herbert Hoover.

== Biography ==
Born in Upland, Pennsylvania, Roop attended the University of Pennsylvania. He was an engineer officer in World War I and rose to the rank of lieutenant colonel during World War II, and later he served as Brigadier General. President Herbert Hoover, on the resignation of Herbert Lord, appointed Roop as U.S. Director of Bureau of the Budget, a post he held from August 15, 1929, until March 4, 1933.

He died on January 23, 1972, in Fairfield, Connecticut, at the age of 83.

Political offices
Preceded by Herbert Lord	Director of the Bureau of the Budget; 1929–1933	Succeeded by Lewis Douglas
