= Herbert Lord =

American journalist and military officer (1859–1930)

Herbert Mayhew Lord
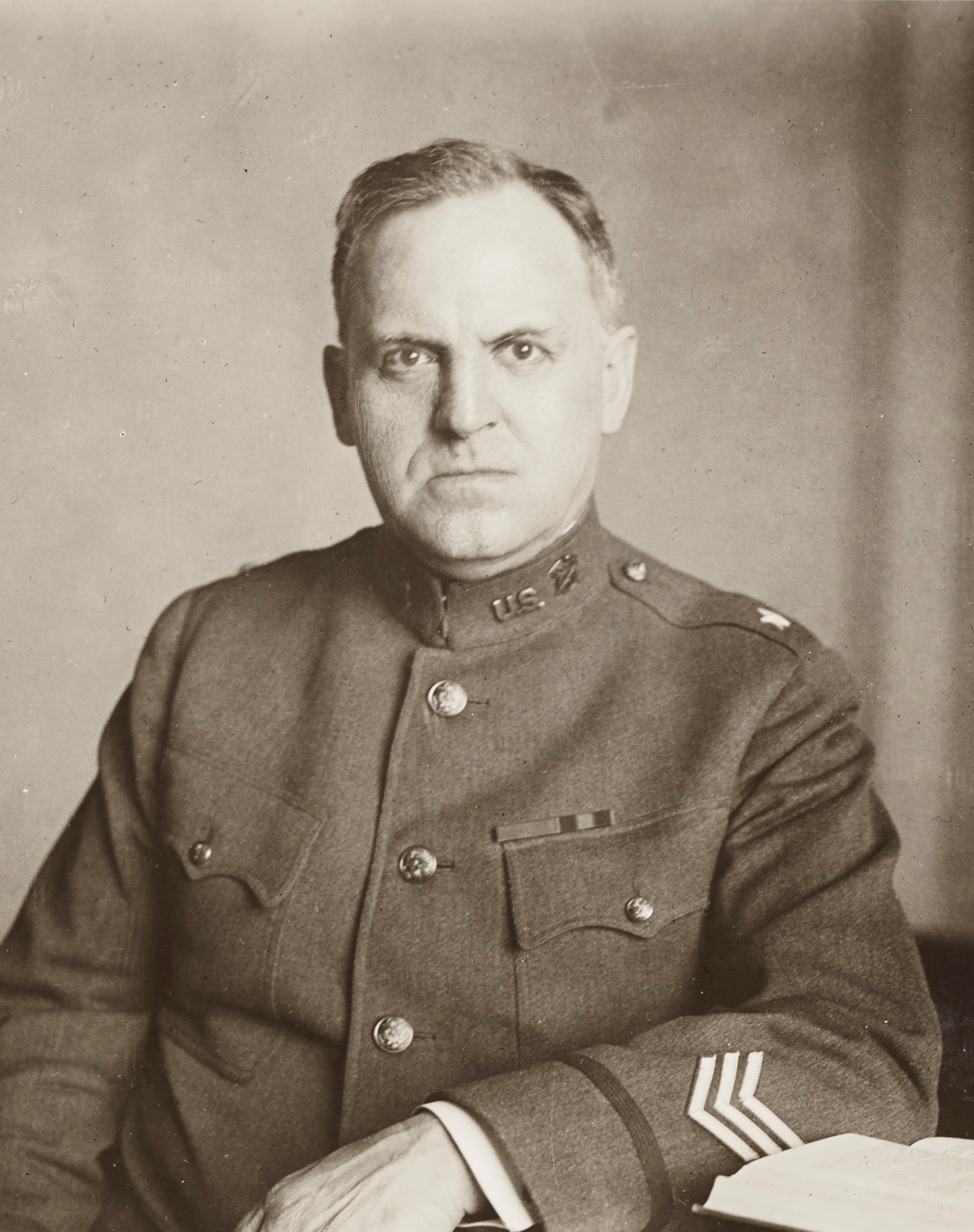
- Lord at work in the Munitions Building, January 1919

2nd Director of the United States Agency of the Budget
- In office July 1, 1922 – May 31, 1929
- President: Warren G. Harding; Calvin Coolidge; Herbert Hoover
- Preceded by: Charles G. Dawes
- Succeeded by: Clawson Roop

Personal details
- Born: December 6, 1859 Rockland, Maine, U.S.
- Died: June 2, 1930 (aged 70) Washington, D.C., U.S.
- Resting place: Arlington National Cemetery
- Party: Republican
- Spouse: Annie Stuart Waldo (m. 1886)
- Children: 3
- Education: Colby College (AB, MA)

Military service
- Allegiance: United States
- Branch/service: United States Army
- Years of service: 1898–1922
- Rank: Brigadier General
- Unit: U.S. Army Paymaster Department
- Commands: Director of Finance, United States Army
- Battles/wars: Spanish–American War; World War I
- Awards: Army Distinguished Service Medal

Herbert Mayhew Lord (December 6, 1859 – June 2, 1930) was a United States Army officer and public official. He was most notable for his service as the Army's Director of Finance during World War I and the Director of the United States Bureau of the Budget (now the Office of Management and Budget) from 1922 to 1929.

A native of Rockland, Maine, Lord received bachelor's and master's degrees from Colby College and worked as a newspaper reporter and editor. As a staff member of the United States House of Representatives, Lord played an important role in the creation of the Dingley Act, which raised tariffs to counteract the lowering of rates that occurred under the Wilson–Gorman Tariff Act. In 1898, Lord began a military career when he was appointed a major of United States Volunteers for the Spanish–American War and assigned to duty with the Paymaster Department. After the war, Lord continued to work in finance for the Army and was frequently called upon to provide expertise for special projects, including overseeing the disbursement of federal disaster relief funds following the Great Salem fire of 1914.

During World War I, Lord was promoted to brigadier general as the Army's Director of Finance and led the effort to manage expenditure of $24 billion in War Department appropriations. His post-war activities included an effort to pay corporations for wartime goods and services when Congress was not in session; his initiative helped avert an economic crisis, and the U.S. Congress retroactively approved his actions. Lord also acted on his own initiative to provide disability payments to soldiers who were wounded, injured, or suffered severe illness during the war, another action Congress approved retroactively. In 1922, Lord was appointed as budget director, and he remained in the position until 1929. Lord prioritized the economy in government during the administrations of presidents Calvin Coolidge and Herbert Hoover, which helped pay down the country's World War I debt and create a surplus in the federal budget.

Lord became ill in 1929 and resigned as budget director. His health did not improve, and he died in Washington, D.C., on June 2, 1930. Lord was buried at Arlington National Cemetery.

== Early life ==
Herbert M. Lord was born in Rockland, Maine, on December 6, 1859, the son of Sabin Lord and Abbie (Swett) Lord. He was raised and educated in Rockland, and graduated from Rockland High School.

Lord briefly attended Bates College, then transferred to Colby College. He graduated from Colby with an A.B. degree in 1884 and taught school while studying for his master's degree. As a teacher, he specialized in the Greek, Latin, and English languages, and also served as the principal of the high school in Thomaston, Maine. Lord also taught music and sang, and his tenor voice earned praise from admirers who suggested he could have pursued a singing career.

He received an M.A. from Colby in 1889. While at Colby, Lord joined the Delta Upsilon fraternity. In 1920, Colby College awarded Lord the honorary degree of LL.D.

== Early career ==
After college, Lord began a career in journalism with a newspaper in Cardiff, Tennessee, for which he worked as a reporter, editor, and advertising manager. He was next employed by a paper in Denver, Colorado, where he remained until returning to Maine. Lord then became editor of The Courier-Gazette in Rockland, of which he later purchased an ownership stake. A Republican, while editing the Rockland paper, Lord also served terms on the city's common council and board of aldermen.

Beginning in 1894, U.S. Representative Nelson Dingley Jr. of Maine employed Lord on the staff of the Ways and Means Committee. When Dingley became the committee's chair in 1897, he appointed Lord as the committee's chief clerk. Lord worked on the details of the Dingley Act, a law that raised tariffs to counteract the Wilson–Gorman Tariff Act, which had lowered tariff rates.

== Military career ==
In 1898, Lord joined the United States Army for the Spanish–American War and was commissioned as a major of United States Volunteers. He was assigned to the Paymaster Department duties and served with the Volunteers until joining the Regular Army. In 1902, Lord was commissioned as a Regular Army captain, and he continued to serve in the Paymaster Department.

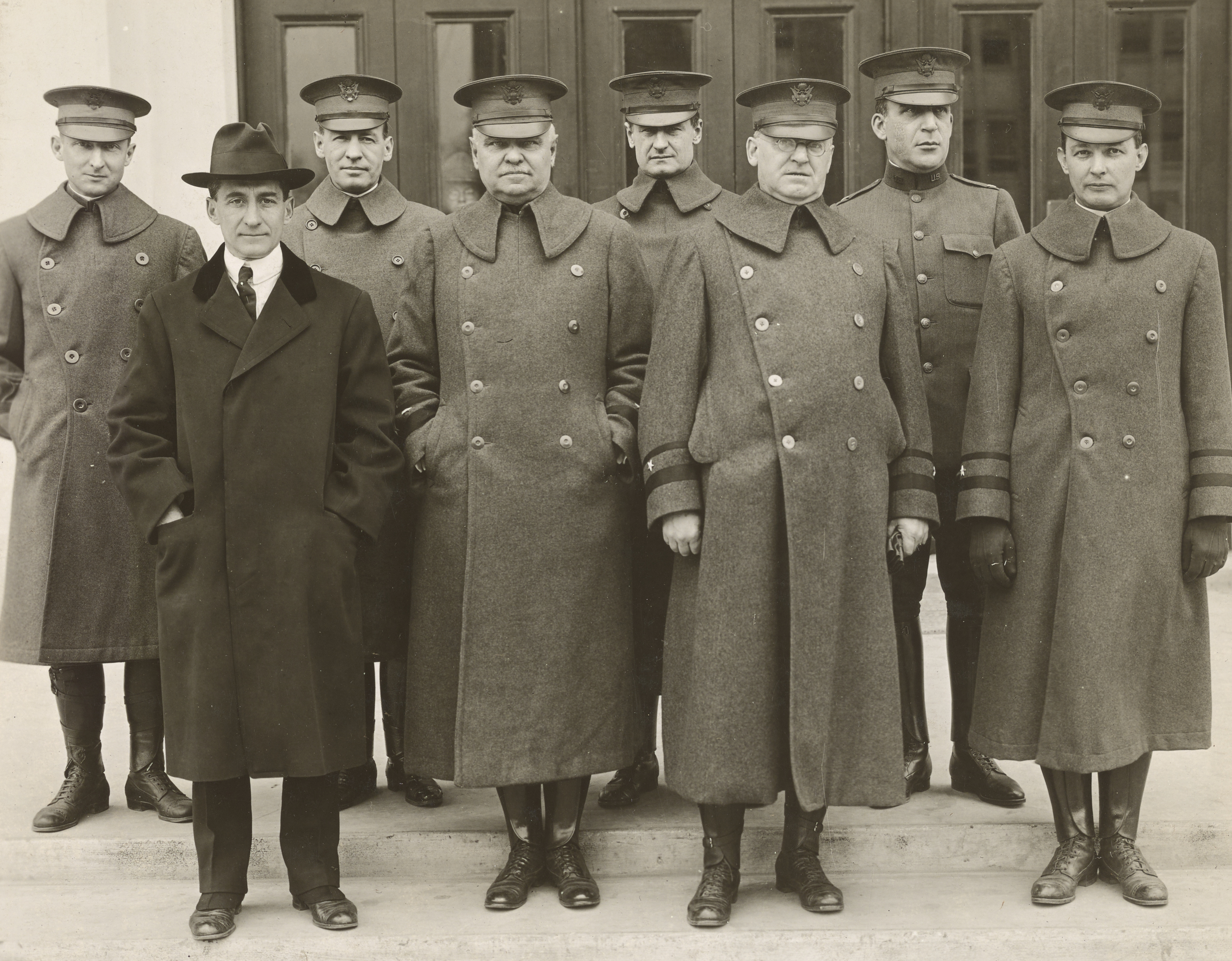
Major General George W. Goethals and members of his staff, December 7, 1918. Front row, left to right: Mr. Gerard Swope, Major General George W. Goethals, Brigadier General Herbert Lord, Brigadier General William H. Rose. Back row, left to right: Edwin W. Fullam, Brigadier General Frank T. Hines, Brigadier General Robert E. Wood, Colonel F. B. Wells.

Lord was serving as a major in 1908 when President Theodore Roosevelt made use of his previous experience by detailing Lord to assist the United States Congress with the development of a new tariff bill. The result, the Payne–Aldrich Tariff Act of 1909, caused a rift between Republican reformers who supported low tariffs and conservative Republicans, who supported protectionism. In 1910, Lord was appointed to oversee the disbursement of U.S. funds to the government of Cuba following the United States military's Second Occupation of Cuba.

Following the Great Salem fire of 1914, President Woodrow Wilson assigned Lord to oversee the disbursement of federal disaster relief funds. $200,000 was appropriated for the effort, and Lord was praised for fulfilling all requests for assistance so efficiently that he saved $150,000 of the fund.

During World War I, served as the Army's Director of Finance. During the war, he was promoted to brigadier general and controlled the expenditure of $24 billion in War Department appropriations. At the end of the war, he was awarded the Army Distinguished Service Medal for his services, the citation for which reads:

The President of the United States of America, authorized by Act of Congress, July 9, 1918, takes pleasure in presenting the Army Distinguished Service Medal to Brigadier General Herbert M. Lord, United States Army, for exceptionally meritorious and distinguished services to the Government of the United States, in a duty of great responsibility during World War I, as Assistant to the Quartermaster General and later as Director of Finance. As such, General Lord was responsible for and had authority over the preparation of estimates, disbursements, money accounts, property accounts, finance reports, and pay and mileage of the Army. The success of the Finance Department was, in a large measure, due to his breadth of vision, executive ability, initiative, and energy.

In March 1919, Congress adjourned without making provisions to pay more than $800 million that the military owed to factories, railroads, and other businesses for services and materiel they provided during the war. On his own initiative, Lord diverted funds appropriated for other purposes so they could be used to pay the debts, which had by then increased to over $1 billion. The creditors were satisfied, which averted an economic crisis, and at the next session of Congress, the House and Senate retroactively approved of Lord's actions.

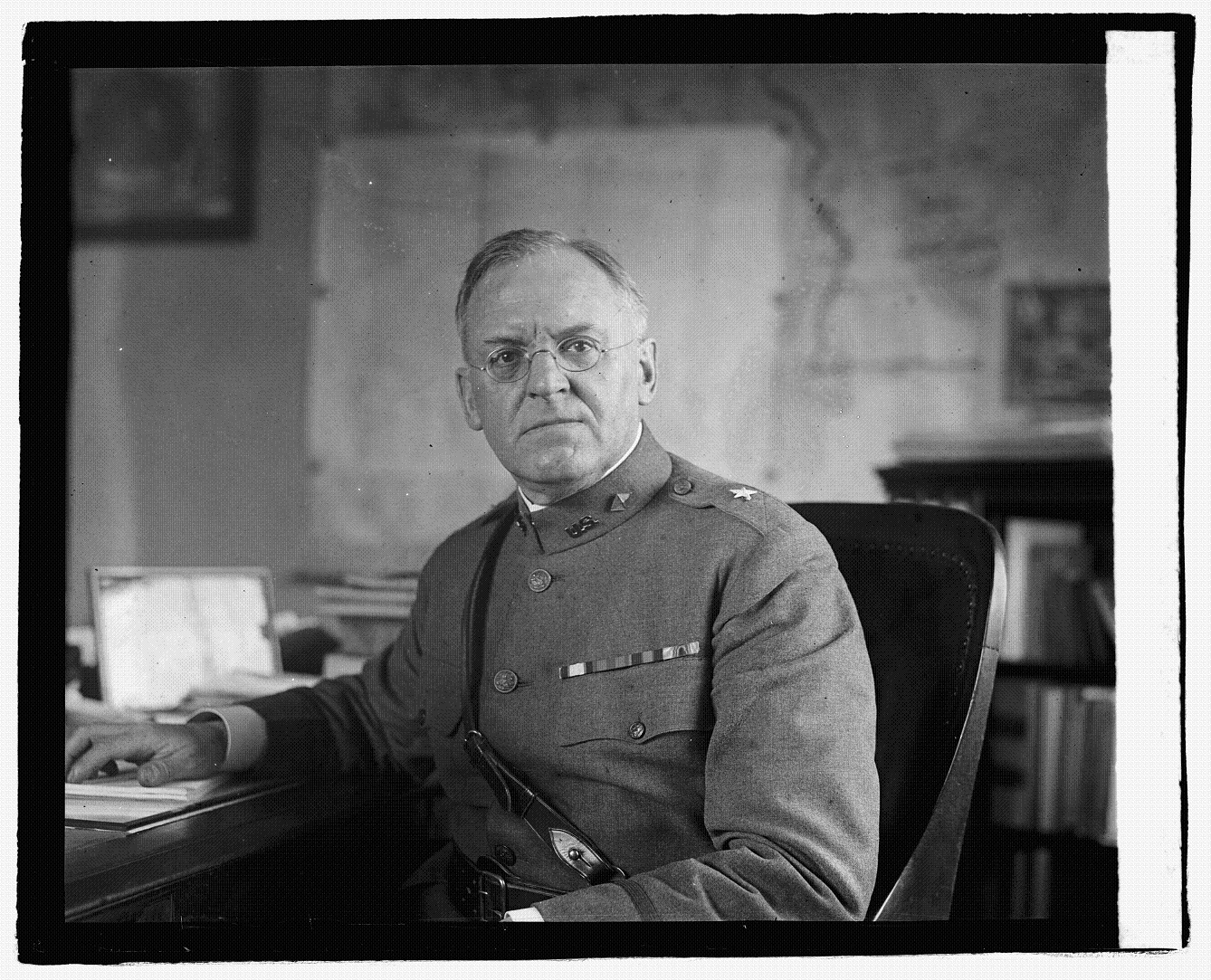
Herbert Lord as Director of the Bureau of the Budget 1921.

In the years following the war, soldiers who had sustained wartime wounds, injuries and serious illness applied for disability payments. Because of haphazard recordkeeping that resulted from the exigencies of service on the front lines, veterans often did not have records to verify their units, type of service, or medical condition. Lord took the initiative to pay them based on their own certification of eligibility, with the War Department later using centrally located records for verification. Lord's efforts enabled the eligible veterans to rapidly obtain their disability payments, and Congress once again retroactively approved his actions.

Lord retired from the Army on June 30, 1922, to accept appointment as Director of the U.S. Bureau of the Budget, succeeding its first director, Charles G. Dawes.

== Budget director ==
Lord took over as budget director on July 1, 1922. During his term, Lord prioritized economy in spending, a policy directed by President Calvin Coolidge and continued by his successor Herbert Hoover. Lord was considered by many observers to be obsessed with reducing spending, including such seemingly trivial measures as reducing the size of postal money order blanks by one inch to save $8,000 a year. Scoffers also mocked Lord when he advocated that government employees save money by extending the length of time they used their pencils. Despite the skeptics, when Lord resigned in 1929, the federal treasury's World War I debt had been eliminated. In addition, the federal surplus had reached $2.7 billion, of which $2.4 billion was attributed to Lord's economizing.

== Death and burial ==
Lord suffered a prolonged illness in 1929, which caused him to resign as budget director. He spent part of the winter of 1929–1930 in St. Petersburg, Florida, in the hopes of regaining his health. His condition continued to worsen, and he died at his home in Washington, D.C.'s Woodley Apartments on June 2, 1930. Lord was buried at Arlington National Cemetery.

== Family ==
In 1886, Lord married Annie Stuart Waldo. They were the parents of three children. Stuart Waldo Lord was born in 1886 and died in 1889. Kenneth Prince Lord (1888–1957) was a career Army officer and retired as a brigadier general. Ruth Mayhew Lord (1890–1974) was the wife of Franklin Robinson Van Rensselaer.

Political offices
Preceded by Charles G. Dawes	Director of the Bureau of the Budget; 1922–1929	Succeeded by Clawson Roop
