= Peggy Zinsser Douglas =

American philanthropist

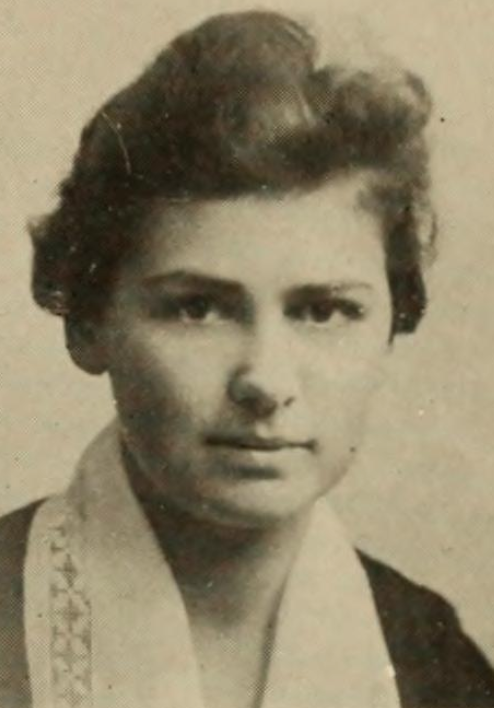
- Peggy Zinsser (later Douglas), from the 1919 yearbook of Smith College
- Born: Margaret S. Zinsser; August 5, 1898; Hastings-on-Hudson, New York, U.S.
- Died: August 15, 1992 (aged 94); Tucson, Arizona, U.S.
- Other name: Peggy Z. Douglas
- Occupations: Philanthropist, arts patron, political hostess
- Spouse: Lewis Williams Douglas
- Children: 3, including Sharman Douglas
- Relatives: John J. McCloy (brother-in-law); Hans Zinsser (uncle); James Douglas Jr. (father-in-law)

Margaret "Peggy" Zinsser Douglas (August 5, 1898 – August 15, 1992) was an American arts patron, philanthropist, and political hostess. She raised millions of dollars for the Metropolitan Opera, served on the board of Lincoln Center, the United Negro College Fund, and many other organizations, and was a diplomatic hostess while her husband Lewis Williams Douglas was the United States ambassador in London from 1947 to 1950.

== Early life and education ==
Zinsser was born in Hastings-on-Hudson, New York, the daughter of Frederick G. Zinsser and Emma Sharman Zinsser. Her father and brother were executives in the chemical industry. Scientist Hans Zinsser was her uncle. Her sister married lawyer and diplomat John J. McCloy. She graduated from Smith College in 1919. Her paternal grandmother left $10,000 to each granddaughter, conditioned on their ability to prepare a "good meal" before the age of 21.

== Career ==
During the 1930s, Douglas was a political wife in Washington, D.C., while her husband was a Congressman and Budget Director under Franklin D. Roosevelt. As the American ambassador's wife in London after World War II, Douglas was a public figure; she stayed at Windsor Castle, dined with Elizabeth II, Eleanor Roosevelt, and Winston Churchill, presided at the opening of Benjamin Franklin House in 1947, visited disabled veterans in hospitals, and presented Academy Awards to British winners in 1949. In 1952 she was honored by the National Conference of Christians and Jews for her work on intercultural understanding. In 1965, she hosted Princess Margaret and her husband during a stay at the Douglases' ranch in Arizona.

Douglas was a formidable fundraiser for the Metropolitan Opera, the American Museum of Natural History, the Child Adoption Service, and other charities, and served on the boards of Lincoln Center, the United Negro College Fund, and the Institute of International Education, among other organizations.

== Personal life ==
Zinsser married Lewis Williams Douglas in 1921. They had a daughter, Sharman Douglas, and sons James and Lewis. Her husband died in 1974, and she died in 1992, in Tucson, Arizona, at the age of 94.
