= Lewis Williams Douglas =

American businessman and politician (1894–1974)

Lewis Douglas
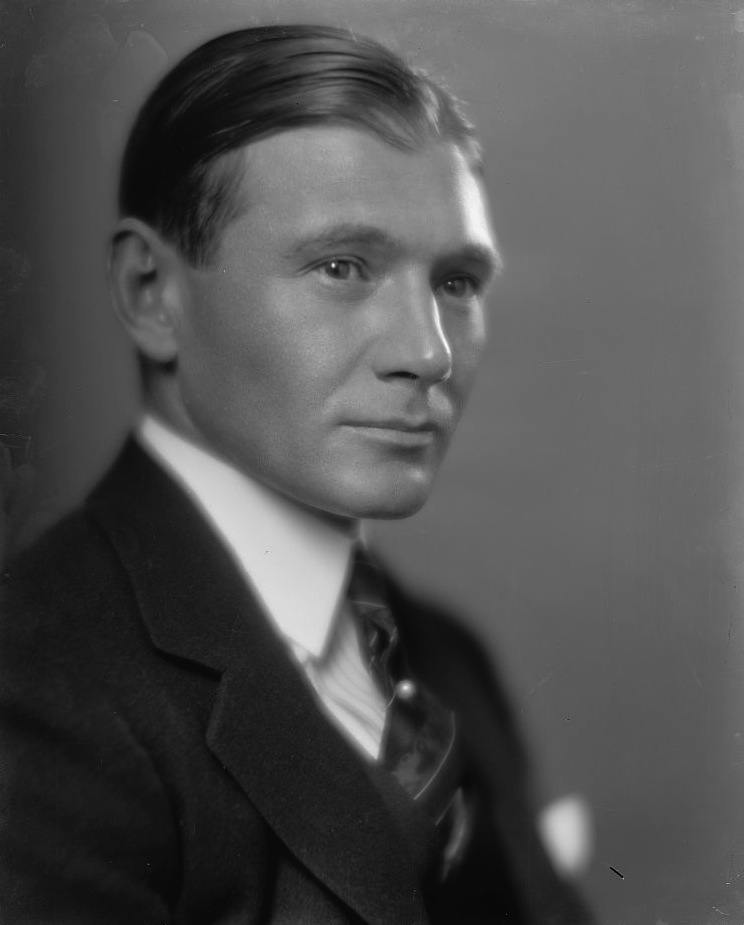
- Douglas, 1905–1945

47th United States Ambassador to the United Kingdom
- In office March 25, 1947 – November 16, 1950
- President: Harry S. Truman
- Preceded by: W. Averell Harriman
- Succeeded by: Walter Gifford

4th Director of the Bureau of the Budget
- In office March 7, 1933 – August 31, 1934
- President: Franklin D. Roosevelt
- Preceded by: Clawson Roop
- Succeeded by: Daniel W. Bell

Member of the U.S. House of Representatives from Arizona's at-large district
- In office March 4, 1927 – March 4, 1933
- Preceded by: Carl Hayden
- Succeeded by: Isabella Greenway

Personal details
- Born: Lewis Williams Douglas; July 2, 1894 Bisbee, Arizona Territory, U.S.
- Died: March 7, 1974 (aged 79) Tucson, Arizona, U.S.
- Party: Democratic
- Spouse: Peggy Zinsser Douglas (m. 1921–1974)
- Children: 3 (including Sharman)
- Parent(s): James Douglas Jr. Josalee Williams
- Education: Amherst College (BA); Massachusetts Institute of Technology

Military service
- Allegiance: United States
- Branch/service: United States Army
- Years of service: 1917–1919
- Rank: First Lieutenant
- Unit: 91st Infantry Division
- Battles/wars: World War I
- Awards: War Cross (Belgium)

Lewis Williams Douglas (July 2, 1894 – March 7, 1974) was an American politician, diplomat, businessman and academic.

== Early life and education ==
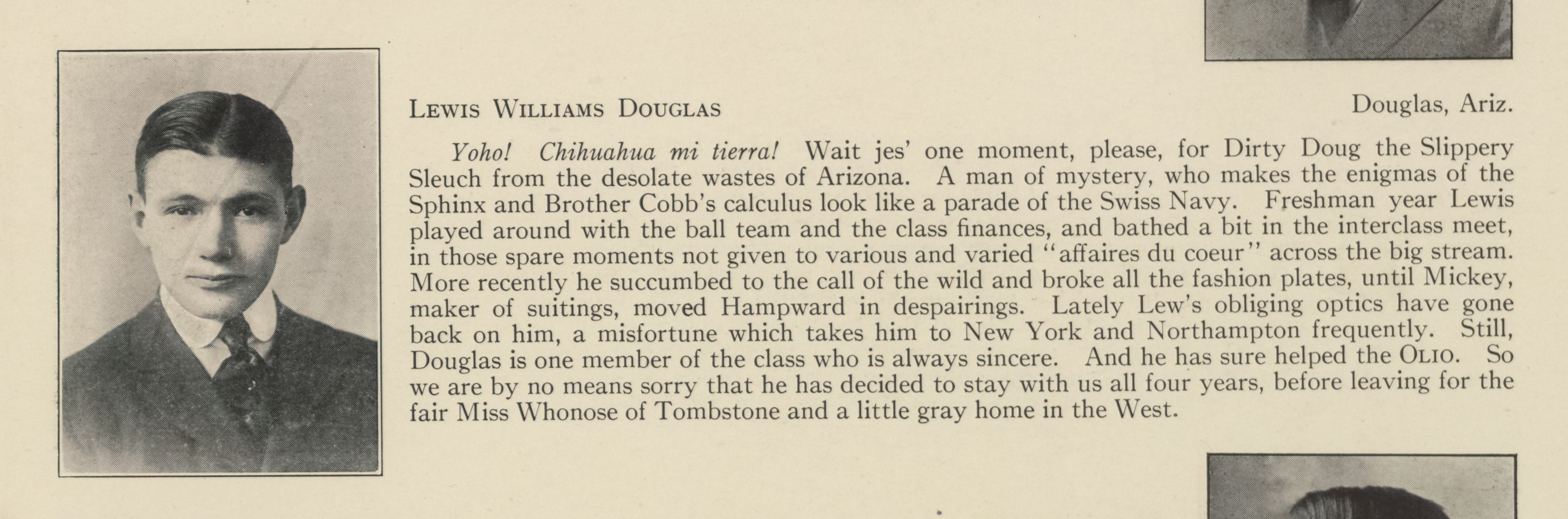
Douglas in the Amherst College yearbook, 1916

Douglas was the son of James Douglas, Jr., a mining executive employed by the Phelps Dodge Company, and his wife Josephine "Josalee" Williams Douglas. Growing up in Bisbee and Nacozari de García, at the age of 11 he was sent east at the insistence of his grandfather, James Douglas to attend school. He spent two years at Hackley School before transferring to Montclair Academy, where he won awards for both academic success and character development, graduating in the class of 1912.

On the advice of Arthur Curtiss James, Douglas attended Amherst College, where he joined Alpha Delta Phi and was involved in both athletics and student government. Though he did not take his coursework seriously at first, his performance improved after taking a course in logic from the college president, Alexander Meiklejohn, and graduated cum laude in 1916 with a degree in economics.

After his graduation, Douglas enrolled at Massachusetts Institute of Technology, where he took courses in preparation for a career as a mining engineer. When the United States joined the First World War, Douglas volunteered for service, receiving a commission as a Second Lieutenant in July 1917. Initially assigned to the field artillery, he later served as an assistant to General Henry A. Greene, the commander of the 91st Infantry Division and was promoted to First Lieutenant in the spring of 1918. Deployed to France in the summer of 1918, he served as an assistant G-3 in the operations branch of division headquarters, where he directed communications. He experienced action at Saint-Mihiel and in the Meuse-Argonne Offensive and received the Belgian Croix de Guerre for heroism.

Upon his discharge in February 1919, Douglas returned to Jerome, Arizona, where he renewed his acquaintance with Margaret "Peggy" Zinsser, with whom he soon fell in love. The following year he taught at Amherst (where he worked as a teaching assistant to Ernest Barker and R. H. Tawney) and Hackley School. After marrying Peggy on June 18, 1921, the young couple moved to Jerome, where Lewis took a job at his father's United Verde Extension mine.

== Political career ==
In the summer of 1922, Douglas agreed to run as a candidate for one of the Jerome area's seats in the Arizona State House of Representatives. Though lacking political experience, his wealth, family name, and record of war service were decisive factors in his favor, as he won both a contested primary and the subsequent general election. Douglas served a single two-year term in the state legislature. A conservative Democrat, Douglas advocated fiscal responsibility and opposed labor legislation. He also objected to the recently signed Colorado River Compact, and proposed an amendment empowering the state to tax electricity produced within its borders.

=== Years in Congress ===
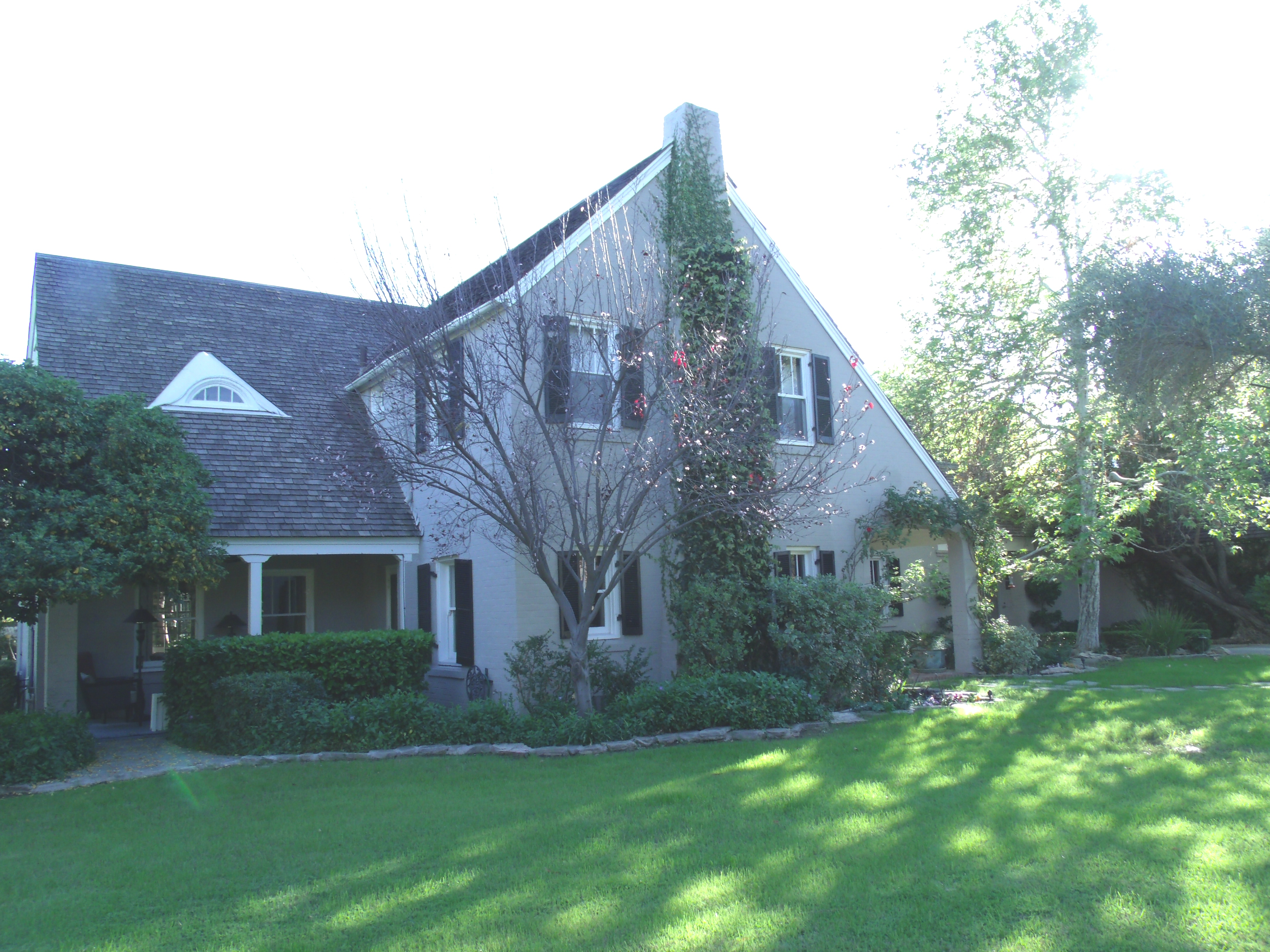
The Lewis Williams Douglas House was built in 1923 and is located at 815 E. Orangewood Ave. in Phoenix, Az. The house is listed in the National Register of Historic Places in 1985 ref. 85000188.

Though some newspapers anticipated that he would seek election to the state senate in 1924, Douglas declined to run for any public office, pursuing a number of business ventures instead. When Carl Hayden, Arizona's lone Congressman, announced that he would challenge the state's incumbent junior senator, Ralph H. Cameron, in 1926, Douglas decided to enter the race to succeed Hayden. Once again benefiting from his family's wealth, name recognition and war record, and enjoying the support of the state's Democratic press, he easily bested five rivals for the Democratic nomination before defeating his Republican challenger in the general election by nearly 20,000 votes.

Douglas served as Arizona's Congressman from the 70th through the 73rd Congress. He sat on the Committee on Irrigation and Reclamation and the Committee on Public Lands, and got along well with most of his colleagues. Though a Democrat, he often voted with Republicans and gained a reputation as a man of principle. During the Great Depression he adhered to the economic orthodoxy of his time, arguing that low tariffs and a balanced federal budget were essential requirements for an economic recovery. Douglas was also an opponent of the bonus bill sought by unemployed veterans, and he was attacked harshly as a result of his position on it.

=== Director of the Bureau of the Budget ===
Though he would have preferred a more conservative candidate, Douglas nonetheless loyally supported Franklin D. Roosevelt as the Democratic Party's nominee in the 1932 presidential election. In December, Douglas was invited to meet with Roosevelt in Albany, New York, where he soon became an influential member of the president-elect's group of advisers. Though there was considerable speculation that Douglas would be offered the secretaryship of State, Treasury, or War, Roosevelt asked him instead to serve as Director of the Bureau of the Budget after Roosevelt's initial choice, J. Swagar Sherley, declined the post due to poor health. After Roosevelt reassured Douglas of his commitment to a balanced budget, the congressman accepted.

Douglas's time as budget director proved frustrating. While he supported the Emergency Banking Act, the Economy Act, and relief organizations such as the Civilian Conservation Corps as necessary in the economic crisis, he objected to legislation such as the Agricultural Adjustment Act, the Tennessee Valley Authority Act, and the Securities Act of 1933 as excessive governmental intervention in the economy. Fearing inflation, he opposed unsuccessfully Roosevelt's decision to take the United States off of the gold standard, and afterward allegedly stated that it marked "the end of western civilization". But the greatest point of disagreement came over the increasing amount of deficit spending taking place. When Douglas learned in June 1934 that Roosevelt planned to request an appropriation of $600 million on top of $2.5 billion appropriation that had already been spent, the news proved to be too much for the budget director, who informed the president of his decision to resign on August 30, 1934.

== Later career ==
Faced with a number of offers from universities and the private sector, Douglas accepted the vice-presidency of the American Cyanamid Company and moved to New York City. He also remained involved in politics, and Republican presidential nominee Alf Landon wanted to name Douglas as his vice presidential candidate during the 1936 presidential election but was dissuaded from doing so by party leaders. Nonetheless, Douglas announced publicly that he was voting for Landon, primarily as a protest against the New Deal.

=== Principal of McGill University ===
In August 1937, Douglas was approached by Sir Edward Beatty about becoming principal of McGill University in Montreal, Canada. Bored with his job at American Cyanamid, Douglas accepted and was installed on January 7, 1938. Douglas would subsequently refer to his time at McGill as the happiest in his life. As principal, he struggled to address the deficit in the university budget and to counteract what he perceived as the socialist leanings within the social science faculty of the university. By reducing expenditures and soliciting private donations he succeeded in restoring McGill to financial health, and launched a public lecture series designed to promote conservative viewpoints. Yet while Douglas did modify tenure policies so as to make it easier to remove radical faculty members, he resisted efforts to restrict the free-speech of faculty, especially as debates over Canada's role in international affairs heated up in 1939.

=== Service in the Second World War ===
Never intending to remain long at McGill, Douglas left the post at the end of 1939 and returned to the United States. There he accepted the presidency of Mutual of New York Life Insurance Company, a financially remunerative position that allowed Douglas to continue his involvement in public issues. An internationalist, Douglas was an early member of the Committee to Defend America by Aiding the Allies, and lobbied Roosevelt to provide more aid to Great Britain. Nonetheless, Douglas campaigned for Wendell Willkie in the 1940 presidential election, largely because of Roosevelt's violation of the "two-term" tradition.

With America's entry into the Second World War, Douglas sought to return to public service. After a short period as deputy to Averell Harriman, the American Lend-Lease representative in Britain, Douglas was named deputy administrator of the War Shipping Administration (WSA). Douglas's appointment came in response to the growing criticism of the WSA's chief administrator, Admiral Emory S. Land, who nonetheless kept his post due to his friendship with the president. As deputy administrator, Douglas emerged as the effective head of the agency, addressing the difficult task of managing the country's shipping needs while fighting a global war. He served as deputy administrator until medical issues and growing tensions with Land led to his resignation in March 1944, after which he traveled to Europe to serve as a special adviser to General Lucius D. Clay on the reconstruction of German finance after the war.

=== Rockefeller Foundation ===
Beginning in 1935, Douglas would serve as a member of the Rockefeller Foundation where he maintained a position on the executive committee from 1936 to 1939. Douglas was elected to the American Philosophical Society in 1942. From 1942 to 1947, Douglas served as a trustee before being appointed as the United States Ambassador to the United Kingdom in 1947.

=== Ambassador to the Court of St. James's ===
In February 1947, Douglas was appointed as the ambassador to the United Kingdom, after the untimely death of the previous appointee, O. Max Gardner. As ambassador, Douglas enjoyed an enhanced status, as the new Secretary of State, George Marshall, delegated considerable authority to his subordinates. Because of this, he played an important role in the passage and implementation of the Marshall Plan as it related to the United Kingdom, and was closely involved in coordinating the American and British response to the Berlin Blockade in 1948. In April 1949 he suffered an accident while fly fishing that permanently damaged his left eye and restricted his involvement in official matters while he underwent a slow and incomplete recovery. Because of the damage done to his eye, Douglas wore an eyepatch over it for the rest of his life. (Lewis was the inspiration for the iconic one-eyed "Hathaway man" in a noted American advertising campaign of the mid-20th century, although the actual model was Baron George Wrangell.)

== Final years ==
After resigning from the ambassadorship in 1950, Douglas returned to the United States and settled in Tucson, Arizona. He was the chairman and director of the Southern Arizona Bank and Trust Company from 1949 until 1966 and served on a number of boards and commissions, including the General Motors Corporation, the Council on Foreign Relations, the Government Study of Foreign Economic Problems, and the President's Task Force on American Indians. Though declining further suggestions to run for public office, he remained actively involved in state and national politics. While typically endorsing Republicans, he remained a Democrat and supported Lyndon B. Johnson over Barry Goldwater in the 1964 presidential election out of concerns for Goldwater's suitability for the presidency. Douglas died in Tucson, Arizona, on March 7, 1974, from complications following surgery to remove an intestinal obstruction. His remains were later cremated and his ashes scattered over the hills of Jerome. In 2002, he was inducted into the Hall of Great Westerners of the National Cowboy & Western Heritage Museum.

== Electoral history ==
Arizona's at-large congressional district: 1926–1932 results
Year	Democrat	Votes	Pct	Republican	Votes	Pct
1926	Lewis Douglas	43,725	64%	Otis J. Baughn	24,502	36%
1928	Lewis Douglas			Guy Axline		
1930	Lewis Douglas	52,343	100%	None	0	0%
1932	Lewis Douglas	75,469	72%	H. B. Wilkinson	29,710	28%

U.S. House of Representatives
Preceded by Carl Hayden	Member of the U.S. House of Representatives from Arizona's at-large congressional district 1927–1933	Succeeded by Isabella Greenway
Political offices
Preceded by Clawson Roop	Director of the Bureau of the Budget; 1933–1934	Succeeded by Daniel W. Bell
Academic offices
Preceded by Arthur Morgan	Principal of McGill University; 1937–1939	Succeeded by Frank James
Diplomatic posts
Preceded by W. Averell Harriman	United States Ambassador to the United Kingdom; 1947–1950	Succeeded by Walter Gifford
