= Kenneth Harris (journalist) =

British journalist (1919–2005)

David Kenneth Harris, CBE (11 November 1919 – 24 June 2005) was a British journalist who worked for The Observer.

He was born in South Wales and educated at Trowbridge grammar school, Wiltshire and Wadham College, Oxford. His undergraduate life was interrupted by the Second World War, where he served in the Royal Artillery. In 1947 he took part in the first postwar Oxford Union debating tour of the United States (with Edward Boyle and Tony Benn) and wrote a book about the experience, Travelling Tongues (1949). He graduated in 1948.

Harris became a journalist for the Sheffield Telegraph in 1948 before joining The Observer in 1950. He was the paper's Washington correspondent until 1953, when he became its labour correspondent. This role brought him into contact with Clement Attlee and he later became Attlee's authorised biographer. He was also the ghost writer for the Durham miners' leader Sam Watson which appeared in The Observer.

Harris also became The Observer's chief interviewer, questioning Alexei Kosygin, Richard Nixon, Princess Anne and Margaret Thatcher. His interview with Kosygin, shortly after he became Soviet Prime Minister, was broadcast on both BBC and ITV. Harris's 1970 interview with the Duke of Windsor and Duchess of Windsor was the last before the Duke's death in 1972.

== Works ==
- Travelling Tongues (1948).
- Conversations (1967).
- Talking To (1971).
- Attlee (1982).
- Personally Speaking (1987). Interviews with David Owen.
- The Wildcatter: A Portrait of Robert O. Anderson (1987).
- Thatcher (1988).
- The Queen (1994).
