= The Duke and Duchess of Windsor in conversation with Kenneth Harris =

1970 interview

The Duke and Duchess of Windsor in conversation with Kenneth Harris is a 1970 interview with Prince Edward, Duke of Windsor, and his wife Wallis, Duchess of Windsor, by the journalist Kenneth Harris.

It was initially broadcast on BBC1 in January 1970, and again on BBC1 as The Tuesday Documentary on 18 August 1970. It was broadcast on BBC Radio 4 on 27 March 1970. It was produced by John Walker. Eleven million viewers watched the broadcast in January 1970.

The interview was released as an LP by BBC Records in 1970.

Edward had abdicated as the British monarch in December 1936 to marry Wallis Simpson. The pair became the Duke and Duchess of Windsor following their marriage in 1937. It was the first major television appearance by the couple, though they had briefly appeared on Edward R. Murrow's television interview show Person to Person in 1956. It had taken several years for Harris to persuade Edward to agree to the interview, and Edward had even tried to back out the evening prior to its recording. The interview was recorded at the Windsors' Parisian home in 4 route du Champ d'Entraînement, in Bois de Boulogne in October 1969.

== Content ==
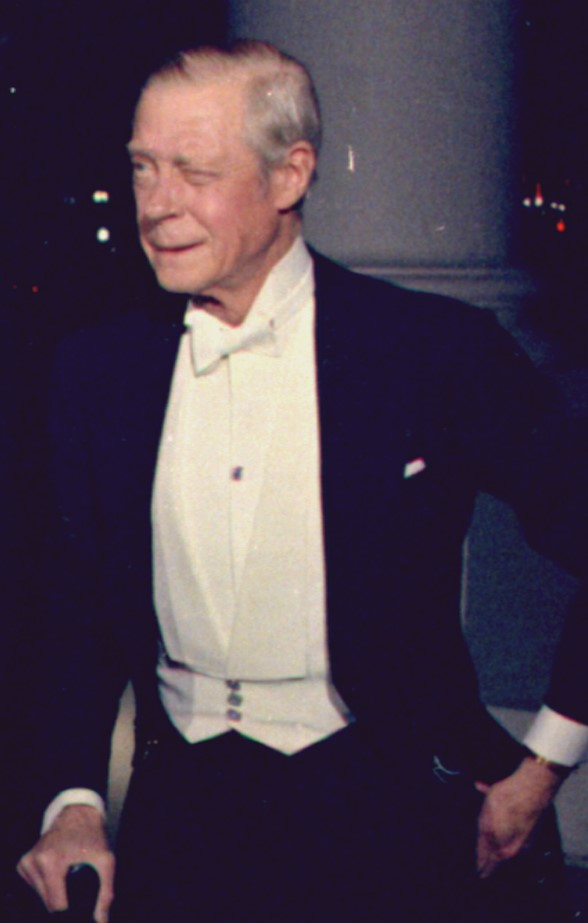

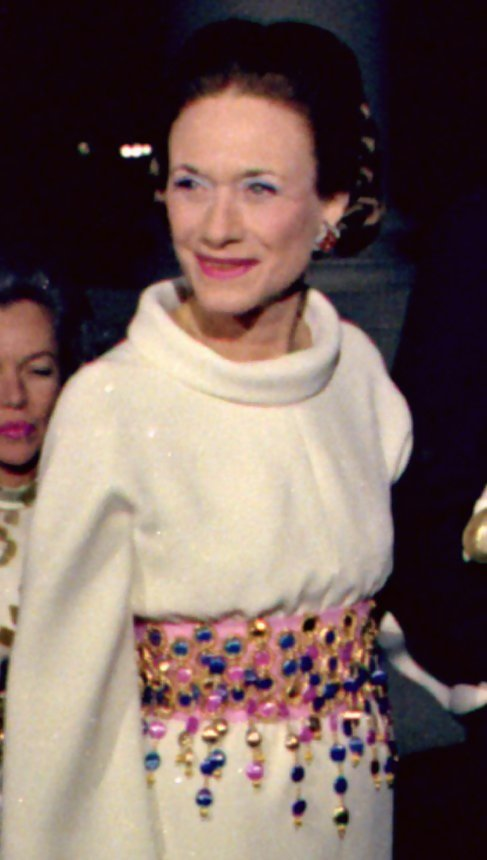
The Duke and Duchess of Windsor in 1970

The programme had two sections; the first section was a conversation between Harris, Edward and Wallis with the second an interview with Edward by Harris. David Wilsworth, writing for The Times, noted that Wallis "did most of the talking" in the first half of the programme. The Radio Times wrote that Edward discussed "the Establishment, his father, golf, blood sports, and his great-niece" and Wallis "children and their parents, careers for women, loneliness, and the Duke's bad habits". Wallis wore a "yellow, chiffon dress, blue eyeshadow and a nervous grimace" according to Alice Hutton, with Edward wearing an "oversized grey suit".

Edward said that a clash with 'The Establishment' would have been inevitable even if he had not had married Wallis but that he had no regrets over his abdication. Edward stated that he would have liked to have reigned longer "... but I was going to do it under my own conditions, so I do not have any regrets, but I take a great interest in my country ... which is Britain, your land and mine, and I wish it well". Discussing his brief reign, Edward said that he wished to be more of an "up-to-date" monarch than a reforming one and was concerned with social issues and wished to change the procedures of the court. Edward said that "To some extent I did [collide with the establishment], not very violently. Not in a bad way ... I'm being conceited but I think it might have helped the establishment too. It might have revived the thinking of the establishment". Wallis felt that Edward "... had lots of pep and was very much ahead of his time. I think he wanted to establish things that were a little—not ready for them perhaps".

Edward said that prior to his reign he had planned to visit economically depressed areas of Britain, especially Wales and Northumberland. Prime Minister Stanley Baldwin called Edward to the House of Commons to talk to him about the visits and had asked him "Why are you ... going up there? Aren't there a lot of other important things to do?" to which Edward replied that "No. Mr. Baldwin, I think it is very important to see how we can't give this people ... unemployment. Some of them have been out for 10 years". Edward felt that Baldwin "suddenly became conscious that he and his Government had actually done very little to alleviate the plight of the unemployed" and after telling Baldwin that the trip had been organised by Sir Alexander Leith, Baldwin gave his approval. Edward became worried that Baldwin was "... beginning to drag me into politics a little too far" and that "... as we all know, politics is the one thing that the Royal Family has to avoid, however much they might like to express their opinion".

Edward felt that the term 'the Establishment' was "a new word to me until about 15 years ago when I heard it" and felt that "It's not easy to explain, it's rather an obscure word, but it must always have existed. I think it means authority, authority of the law, of the church ... I suppose, the monarch to a certain extent. And universities and maybe the top brass of the Navy and the Army". He recalled reading in a newspaper article "two or three years ago" that Prince Philip, Duke of Edinburgh, was not really part of the Establishment as "he goes out very much on his own" and that "nor was the Duke of Windsor" which Edward regarded as "... very true" feeling that his father, George V, and his brother, George VI, were part of the Establishment, but that "I was independent".

Edward felt that "young people today" behaved "extremely well" with Wallis feeling that they were "much more independent mentally" than in her youth. Regarding the mini skirt Wallis said that "I think that you certainly know what you are getting, don't you?". In a conversation about careers and jobs, Wallis said that she had wished to be the "head of an advertising agency" with Edward saying that he had had no reply after he had offered his services following his time spent as Governor of the Bahamas. Edward said "most of the people" who prevented him getting a job were now dead, saying that they were "I'm afraid, under ground ... I don't know, it's hard to say".

On being asked if she had any regrets, Wallis replied "Oh about certain things, yes, I wish it could have been different. I mean, I'm extremely happy ... We've had some hard times but who hasn't? Some of us just have to learn to live with that ... I think happiness is a great secret".

== Reception ==
David Wilsworth, writing for The Times, felt that "The tone of the programme was serious, but relaxed with occasional touches of humour". The Daily Mail wrote that "The programme forces you to wonder how things would have turned out had he not abdicated".

Writing in his 2011 biography of Wallis, Hugo Vickers felt that the interview was "... the most revealing interview that the Duke and Duchess ever gave and bears rewatching even now". Vickers noted "one especially telling moment" when at one point Wallis announces "We're very happy" and describes Edward as looking "suddenly relieved ... and fumbles uncomfortably for her hand, which he then holds".

The interview received renewed attention in 2021 in anticipation of the broadcast of Oprah with Meghan and Harry, Oprah Winfrey's interview with Meghan, Duchess of Sussex and Prince Harry, Duke of Sussex. Writing in The Independent, Sean O'Grady wrote that Edward and Wallis's interview was "mostly harmless anecdotes" and their love story was "a bit of a Megxit prototype ... American divorcee comes over here, whirlwind romance, steals our dashing royal, takes him into exile, argues with his brother about money and titles, stripped of much of a role ... you get the idea".

Writing in The Independent in March 2021, Alice Hutton felt that the interview "paints them as two tragic figures from a bygone era, recycling anecdotes from more than 30 years ago" and that one of Edward's modernisations was to wear bowler hats instead of top hats. Hutton felt that "What is striking ... is just how boring the sit down is" and noted that Wallis was "asked an extraordinary succession of questions about whether women, in 1970, were destroying their sex if they wanted to work". Harris asked Wallis if she "[didn't] think that women have suffered somewhat over the last 30 years by being too competitive with men, that they've lost something of their essential character and charm?" to which she replied that "No I don't think so really. I know a great many women in business and I don't think they have at all".
