= Al Gore presidential campaign =

Al Gore, the 45th vice president of the United States (1993–2001) and U.S. senator from Tennessee (1985–1993), has unsuccessfully run for president twice:

- Al Gore 1988 presidential campaign
- Al Gore 2000 presidential campaign
