= Tina Flournoy =

American political advisor (born 1956)

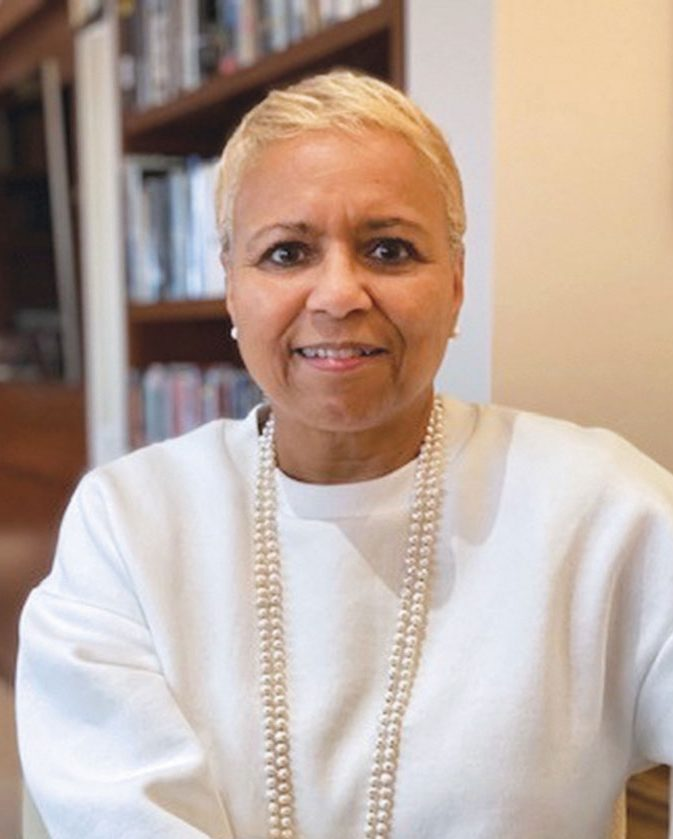
- Flournoy in 2021

Chief of Staff to the Vice President
- In office January 20, 2021 – May 16, 2022
- Vice President: Kamala Harris
- Preceded by: Marc Short
- Succeeded by: Lorraine Voles

Personal details
- Born: April 30, 1956 (age 70) U.S.
- Party: Democratic
- Education: Georgetown University (BA, JD)

Hartina M. "Tina" Flournoy (born April 30, 1956) is an American political advisor who served as chief of staff to vice president Kamala Harris from 2021 to 2022.

== Education ==
Flournoy graduated from Georgetown University in 1978 and earned a Juris Doctor from the Georgetown University Law Center in 1984.

== Career ==
After graduating from Georgetown Law, Flournoy served as a clerk for Julia Cooper Mack of the District of Columbia Court of Appeals.

Flournoy was the Assistant to the President for Public Policy at the American Federation of Teachers, an international union representing 1.6 million members. There, she directed the work of the legislative, political, field and mobilization, and human rights and community outreach departments.

Flournoy served as an executive at tobacco giant Philip Morris.

In 1992, Flournoy was Counsel to Paul Kirk and Ron Brown on the Democratic National Committee, the General Counsel for the 1992 Democratic National Convention, Deputy Campaign Manager for the Transition of Bill Clinton and Al Gore and an employee in the White House Office of Presidential Personnel. During the 2000 United States presidential election, Flournoy was traveling Chief of Staff to the Democratic vice-presidential nominee Joe Lieberman and Finance Director for the Al Gore 2000 presidential campaign.

In 2004, Flournoy worked on the transition of Howard Dean prior to his tenure as chair of the Democratic National Committee.

In 2013 Flournoy took up a role as chief of staff for former President Bill Clinton.

== Chief of Staff to the Vice President ==
On December 3, 2020, it was announced that Flournoy would be Chief of Staff to then-Vice President-elect Kamala Harris and would continue the role once Harris was sworn in.

In a June 30, 2021 article in Politico the vice president's office was described as dysfunctional, tense, and trustless with some of the blame resting with Flournoy. Politico interviewed 22 associates of Harris and president Biden and current and former vice presidential aides. The article came to the conclusion that Flournoy, in an effort to screen and protect Harris, created a restrictive environment where decisions are prolonged and ideas are met with dismissals or ignored.

On April 21, 2022, the White House announced that Flournoy would be leaving the office. She was replaced with Lorraine Voles, former senior advisor to Vice President Harris and communications director to Vice President Al Gore and then-Senator Hillary Clinton.

== Post White House ==
On March 24, 2023, Flournoy was appointed to the President's Council on Sports, Fitness and Nutrition.

Political offices
Preceded by Marc Short	Chief of Staff to the Vice President; 2021–2022	Succeeded by Lorraine Voles
