= Erin Wilson =

American government official

Deputy Chief of Staff to the Vice President
- In office May 31, 2022 – January 20, 2025
- Vice President: Kamala Harris
- Leader: Lorraine Voles
- Preceded by: Michael Fuchs
- Succeeded by: Bryan Gray

Personal details
- Party: Democratic
- Education: University of Pennsylvania (BA)

Erin Wilson is an American government official who served as deputy chief of staff to Vice President of the United States Kamala Harris from 2022 to 2025.

== Formative years ==
Born in Philadelphia, Pennsylvania, Wilson graduated cum laude from the University of Pennsylvania in the early 2000s with a Bachelor of Arts degree in political science and government.

== Career ==
From 2002 to 2004, Wilson was employed as a street team leader by Rock the Vote. In 2005, she served as an intern with the Washington, D.C. offices of U.S. Congressman Alcee Hastings and the Congressional Black Caucus Foundation. Between 2006 and 2014, she was employed in various capacities with the Bob Casey for Senate Campaign and then with the office of U.S. Senator Bob Casey Jr., including as director of outreach and special projects from November 2009 to May 2011 and as deputy state director from May 2011 to July 2014. In 2016, she worked for Hillary for America. Wilson returned to Senator Casey's office as his state director in 2017.

Wilson served as national political director for Joe Biden’s 2020 Presidential campaign and as a Democratic National Committee staffer.

Wilson became deputy chief of staff to Vice President Harris in 2022. Prior to her hiring by Harris, Wilson served as deputy director of the White House Office of Political Strategy and Outreach.

=== Public service activities ===
- Friends of the Free Library of Philadelphia (board of directors)
- Mural Arts Advocates (board of directors)

Political offices
| Preceded by Michael Fuchs | Deputy Chief of Staff to the Vice President of the United States; 2022– | Succeeded by Incumbent |
