= Jack Quinn (lawyer) =

American lawyer (1949–2024)

White House Counsel
- In office November 1, 1995 – February 1997
- President: Bill Clinton
- Preceded by: Abner Mikva
- Succeeded by: Chuck Ruff

Chief of Staff to the Vice President
- In office July 7, 1993 – November 1, 1995
- Vice President: Al Gore
- Preceded by: Roy Neel
- Succeeded by: Ron Klain

Personal details
- Born: John Michael Quinn; August 16, 1949 New York City, New York, U.S.
- Died: May 8, 2024 (aged 74) Washington, D.C., U.S.
- Party: Democratic
- Spouse: Susanna Monroney
- Children: 5
- Education: Georgetown University (BA, JD)

John Michael Quinn (August 16, 1949 – May 8, 2024) was an American lawyer, businessman and CNN television commentator.

== Early life ==
Quinn attended Georgetown University, graduating with a Bachelor of Arts degree in 1971. He later attended Georgetown University Law Center, where he was an Editor of the Georgetown Law Journal, while also serving as a staff member on the U.S. Senate Select Committee on Nutrition and Human Needs (1969–1973) and, later, as a legislative assistant to Senator Floyd K. Haskell of Colorado (1973–1975). He graduated with a J.D. in 1975.

== Career ==
At the age of 26, from 1975 to 1976, Quinn directed Mo Udall's presidential campaign. Later Quinn became a partner at Arnold & Porter in Washington, D.C., working there for almost 20 years. He also taught as an adjunct professor of constitutional law at Georgetown University Law Center.

Quinn served as general counsel to the presidential campaigns of Senators Gary Hart and Bob Kerrey, and was both counsel and communications director to Senator Al Gore's 1988 presidential campaign. He was again a Gore advisor during Gore's campaign as Bill Clinton's running mate in the 1992 election, coordinating Gore's preparation for the vice-presidential debates.

After Clinton and Gore won the election, Quinn was appointed Deputy Chief of Staff and Counsel to the Vice President. Later he was promoted to Chief of Staff to the Vice President of the United States, retaining the Counsel to the Vice President title. In September 1995, Quinn became White House Counsel to President Clinton and served in that role until early in 1997.

When Quinn left the White House in 1997, he returned to Arnold & Porter. In 2000, he co-founded Quinn Gillespie & Associates, a public affairs and public relations firm with Ed Gillespie, a leading Republican operative. The two met as adversaries on Tony Snow's Fox News talk show. Their partnership is considered an early example of the trend towards an interdisciplinary and bipartisan "one-stop shopping" approach to lobbying.

Quinn served on the Boards of the Philadelphia Stock Exchange (1997–98), Fannie Mae (1997–2000) and the Robert F. Kennedy Memorial. He most recently served on the Boards of Alternative Packaging Systems (APS), a developer of innovative non-aerosol packaging technologies and The Water Company, a developer of water purification technologies for industrial uses. Until late 2016, he was a director of Constellis, a holding company that includes several private security companies (including Academi, Triple Canopy, and The Olive Group) that provide security services and training to both governmental and private sector clients. Quinn co-chaired the Governance and Compliance Committee of Academi with former Attorney General and Senator John Ashcroft.

Quinn was later a legal analyst at CNN. He also practiced law at Manatt, Phelps & Phillips and in the Law Office of John M. Quinn. In the latter practice, he represented thousands of family members of victims of the 9/11 terrorist attacks. Quinn was among the lawyers involved in promoting the Justice Against Sponsors of Terrorism Act, which became law when Congress overrode the veto issued by President Barack Obama. That veto was the only one overridden during Obama's presidency.

== Personal life and death ==
Quinn was married to Susanna Monroney Quinn of the Mellon Banking Family and lived in Washington, D.C., with their son, Storm Quinn, and Susanna's daughter from a previous marriage, Jocelyn Quinn. He had six older children, Kathleen Schraff Quinn, Jonathan Quinn, Megan Quinn, Caitlin Quinn Slaviero and Brendan Quinn. He also had thirteen grandchildren.

Quinn died at his home in Washington on May 8, 2024, of complications from a double-lung transplant that he had undergone in 2019. He was 74.

Political offices
Preceded by Roy Neel	Chief of Staff to the Vice President; 1993–1995	Succeeded by Ron Klain
Legal offices
Preceded by Abner Mikva	White House Counsel; 1995–1997	Succeeded by Chuck Ruff
