= Presidential transition of George H. W. Bush =

Transfer of presidential power from Ronald Reagan to George H. W. Bush

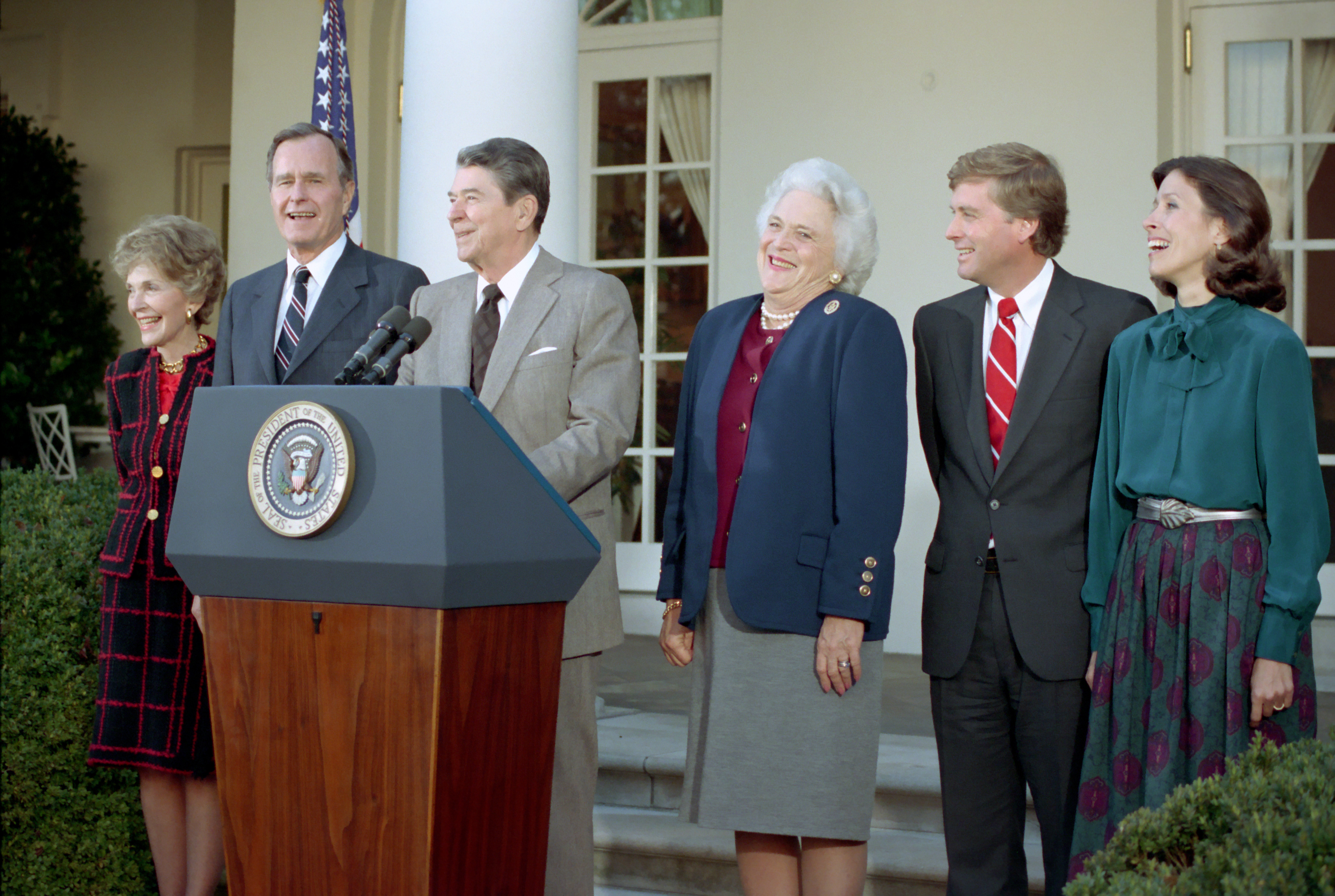
- President-elect Bush speaks in the White House Rose Garden accompanied by his wife Barbara, President and First Lady Ronald and Nancy Reagan, as well as Vice President-elect Dan Quayle and his wife Marilyn.
- Election date: November 8, 1988
- Inauguration date: January 20, 1989
- President-elect: George H. W. Bush (Republican)
- Vice president-elect: Dan Quayle (Republican)
- Outgoing president: Ronald Reagan (Republican)
- Outgoing vice president: George H. W. Bush (Republican)
- Headquarters: Washington, D.C.
- Co-directors: Craig L. Fuller and Robert Teeter

The presidential transition of George H. W. Bush began when then-Vice President Bush won the United States 1988 United States presidential election, becoming the president-elect, and ended when Bush was inaugurated on January 20, 1989.

As of 2024–25, this was the last instance of a "friendly takeover", in which the outgoing president and the president-elect were of the same political party, something that happened only once before—the 1928–29 presidential transition of Herbert Hoover—and the last transition of an incumbent vice president.

== "Friendly takeover" ==
This transition was an instance of a "friendly takeover", a term used for a presidential transition in which both the outgoing and incoming presidents are of the same political party. In November 1988, Chase Untermeyer would embrace describing the Bush transition with this term. In this instance, both the outgoing Ronald Reagan and the incoming Bush were Republicans, and Bush was the incumbent vice president, having served under Reagan since 1981. This was the eleventh instance of a post-election "friendly takeover" in United States history, and the first instance of one since Herbert Hoover, in his presidential transition, succeeded Calvin Coolidge. This was also the first presidential transition in which an outgoing president was handing-over power to their own vice president since the 1836–37 transition, when Andrew Jackson was succeeded by his vice president Martin Van Buren.

== Pre-election developments ==
=== Legislative changes ===
Ahead of the 1988 election, there was bipartisan agreement that changes needed to be made to presidential transitions in order to make them easier. This agreement between parties, perhaps, was attributable to the fact that there would be a presidential transition occurring in the year 1988, since President Reagan was term-limited. One of the changes being pushed in congress was to increase the amount of funds provided by the government to a transition. Since 1976, the government had provided $2 million to the president-elect's team and $1 million to the outgoing president's administration to fund a transition.

Legislation named the Presidential Transitions Effectiveness Act was successfully passed in 1988. In part, this legislation increases the amount given to presidential transitions to $3.5 million for the president-elect's team and $1.5 million to the outgoing president's administration. It also required that private contributions to transitions and the names of transition personnel would be publicly disclosed. It required, in return for receiving federal services and funding, transition teams would formally disclose the date, source, and amount of all privately contributed funds within 30 days after the inauguration. The legislation also placed a cap of $5,000 on private contributions from any one person or organization to a transition team. The bill also required transitions to disclose information about transition team members prior to initial contact with a federal department or agency.

There had also been an unsuccessful effort to altogether stop president-elects from accepting private contributions to help fund their transitions, a bill for which was approved in the United States House of Representatives on March 31, 1988.

=== Transition planning ===
Early discussions about a prospective presidential transition for Bush began in late 1987. In January 1988, Bush privately selected Chase Untermeyer to lead the pre-election planning of his potential presidential transition.

Six months before the election, in April 1988 (after Bush had become the Republican Party's presumptive nominee), action for the planning for a potential Bush presidential transition began in earnest, being led, at this stage, by Untermeyer. This planning effort maintained a low-key profile.

At the same time, Reagan's staff took steps to prepare for a presidential transition. This included having his director of President Personnel meet with Untermeyer for discussions, and having his White House chief of staff, Kenneth Duberstein, prepare a checklist for the transition team of whichever candidate would win the election.

In mid-October, Bush said that, if elected, he would be ready to quickly name his Cabinet picks.

== Official transition ==
On November 9, Bush named Craig L. Fuller and Robert Teeter as the heads of his transition team. Fuller was his Vice presidential chief of staff, while Teeter had been his campaign's top pollster and senior strategist. This would be indicative of the rest of the transition, where Bush largely relied on close advisors and political allies he had become acquainted with over his career to lead the effort. Bush also named Chase Untermeyer as its personnel director, and pledged "major turnover" in order to "reinvigorate" the government. He named C. Boyden Gray, his longtime legal counsel, as the transition's legal advisor, and Sheila Tate, who had been the campaign's press secretary, as the press secretary of the transition. These members Bush named at the start of his transition were largely young, in the 30s and 40s, had reputations as moderate-leaning Republicans, had years of experience in Washington, D.C. politics, and had (except for Tate) worked with Bush for several years.

Untermeyer remained on the transition as a deputy. Bush also named James Baker as an advisor on "key aspects" of the transition. While Untermeyer's original recommendation was for the transition to have a small staff of roughly 100, the staff would grow to around 225 members. Even still, this transition was much smaller than the previous Reagan transition, which had accumulated a massive 1,000 to 1,500 volunteers and paid staff. Bush had publicly expressed his desire to run, "a somewhat leaner transition organization than we had in 1980."

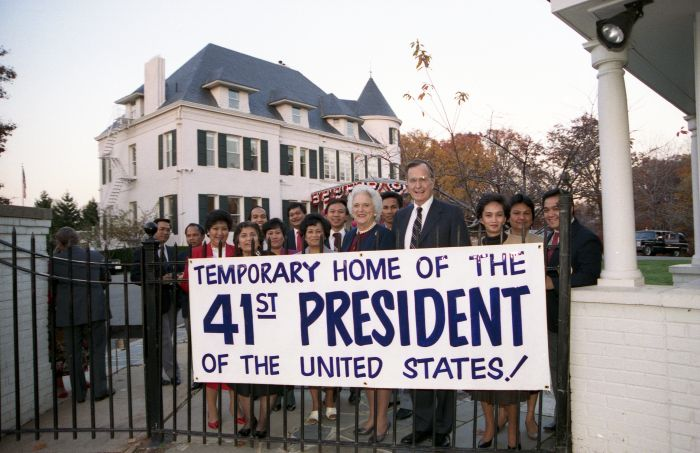
President-elect Bush and his wife Barbara hang a banner from the gate outside Number One Observatory Circle, Bush's official residence as vice president.

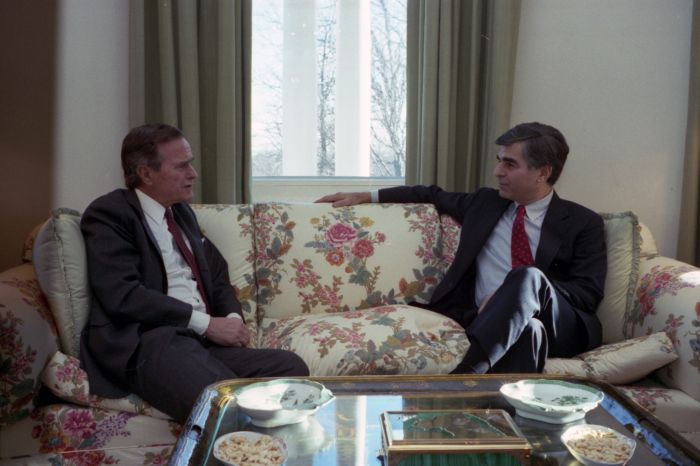
President-elect Bush meets with his Democratic 1988 presidential election opponent Michael Dukakis on December 2, 1988.

The transition team received $3.5 million and the outgoing White House received $1.75 million in funding from the federal government. The outgoing White House received $250,000 less than the normally would be given to a transition, due to the fact that the incumbent vice president (Bush) would not be transitioning out of government.

In mid-November, Bush opened his transition office on Dupont Circle in Washington, D.C. The transition opted to use a private building at expense, rather than the alternative of having the General Services Administration provide his team office space in a federal government property, which would have been free-of-charge to the transition.

On November 22, 1988, Duberstein requested that both Cabinet members and agency heads provide information to the transition team pertaining to organizational matters, goals and functions, resource descriptions, congressional oversight committees, regulatory programs, and other important matters of relevance to each agency.

By the end of November, the majority of executive branch agencies had already designated internal transition leaders to assist Bush's transition liaisons. Because the transition did not have large teams for each agency, Duberstein sent a memo to agency political appointees urging them to prepare briefing brooks for incoming appointees. In regard to White House aides, the transition suffered from a lack of communication between the outgoing aides and their counterparts in Bush's planned administration.

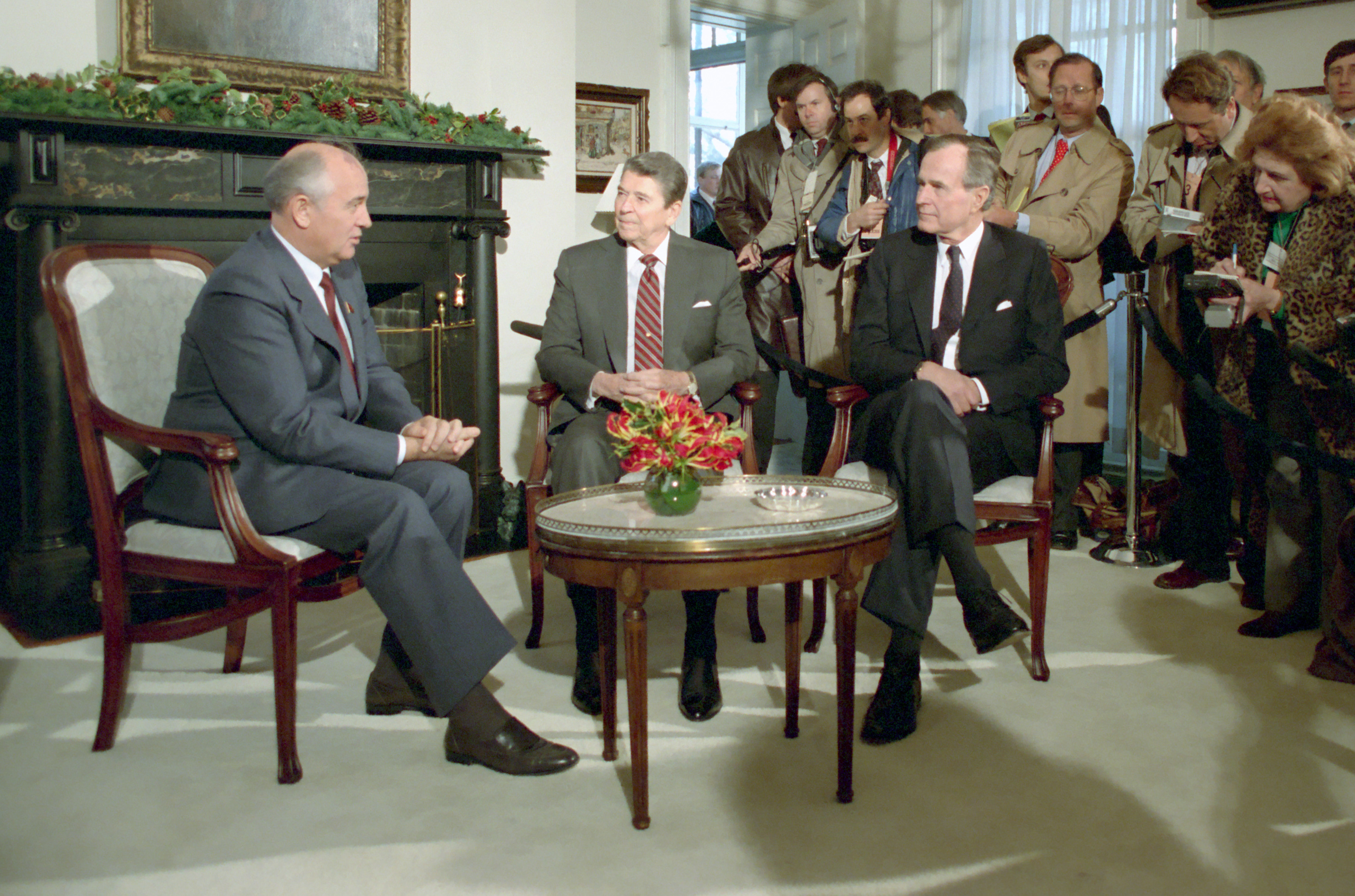
President-elect Bush with President Reagan and Soviet General Secretary Gorbachev during the Governors Island Summit

On December 7, Bush joined Reagan for the Governors Island Summit with Soviet Union general secretary Mikhail Gorbachev.

Nine days before Bush's inauguration, his wife Barbara received a tour of the White House from Reagan's wife Nancy. The two wives had an unfriendly relationship with one another, and it was reported that the tour that Nancy Reagan gave was rather curt.

Reagan is credited with, during this transition, having begun a tradition of presidents leaving a handwritten note in the Oval Office for their successors.

=== Selection of appointees ===
As many as about 5,000 jobs would be available for the incoming president to appoint new holders to.

The day after the election, Bush named his first Cabinet secretary designee, designating James A. Baker as his choice for secretary of state. This was unusually early, at the time, for a president-elect to begin naming Cabinet designees, as the earliest any of the last several president-elects had begun doing so in their transitions was when Dwight D. Eisenhower did so 16 days after his election.

Nine days after winning the election, Bush chose John H. Sununu to serve as his White House chief of staff. Per media reports, in the days after the election, there had been tense disagreement among his staff about who should hold this position in Bush's administration. According to these reports, both Fuller and Teeter were opposed to the choice of Sununu, and this would be the reason that neither of them chose to join Bush's presidential administration after the transition.

The transition was marred by confusion among incumbents holders of appointed offices as to whether they could expect to retain their positions into the Bush administration. Reagan had asked his appointees to submit letters of resignation, to make way for Bush appointees. Reagan requested that cabinet appointees and more than 500 other political appointees tender their resignations in time for Bush's presidency. However, many appointees, wrongly presuming they would be retained in the "friendly takeover", did not do so. Reagan's White House chief of staff, Kenneth Duberstein, would later recount having to have uncomfortable conversations with individuals to persuade them to tender their resignations. While many Reagan appointees were expected to resign, it had been anticipated from the start of the transition that select recent Reagan appointees, who Bush had had input in hiring, would remain for the Bush administration. Bush did keep a number of Reagan appointees. For instance, of his 53 White House staff hires, 27 had held a role in the Reagan administration. Bush also had said shortly after the election that he would retain three Reagan Cabinet secretaries, treasury secretary Nicholas F. Brady, attorney general Richard Thornburgh, and secretary of education Lauro Cavazos. Additionally, Bush selected many more Reagan high-ranking administration officials to different top positions than the ones that they had held under Reagan.

Many of Bush's Cabinet selections were longtime associates with strong levels of prior government experience. Bush's picks for his Cabinet were more ethnically diverse than those of the Cabinets previous Republican Party presidents, including two women, two hispanic Americans, and an African-American.

Some of Bush's Cabinet picks would attract controversy. For instance, his pick for secretary of health and human services, Louis Wade Sullivan, encountered some resistance from "pro-life" conservatives because of his previously stated stance on abortion. Sullivan had previously been quoted as saying that, while he opposed federal funding for abortion, he supported what he regarded to be a woman's right to elect for an abortion if she desires one. Sullivan, once nominated, would say he would side with Bush's stance of opposing abortions in most instances. Sullivan would ultimately express opposition to abortion during his United States Senate confirmation process, and was confirmed. John Tower, Bush's selection for secretary of defense, would later attract tremendous controversy during his United States Senate confirmation process in the early days of Bush's presidency, ultimately becoming the first Cabinet nominee formally rejected in a U.S. Senate vote in 30 years, and the most recent one.

==== Defense and foreign policy ====
- Brent Scowcroft, national security advisor
- John Tower, secretary of defense
- James Baker, secretary of state (announced November 9, 1989)
- William H. Webster, director of central intelligence incumbent officeholder
- Thomas Pickering, United States ambassador to the United Nations
- Edward J. Derwinski, under secretary of state

==== Domestic policy ====
- Clayton Yeutter, secretary of agriculture (announced December 14, 1988)
- Richard Thornburgh, attorney general (announced November 21, 1988) incumbent officeholder
- Lauro F. Cavazos, secretary of education (announced November 21, 1988) incumbent officeholder
- James D. Watkins, secretary of energy (announced January 12, 1989)
- Louis Wade Sullivan, secretary of health and human services (announced December 22, 1988)
- Jack Kemp, secretary of housing and urban development (announced December 19, 1988)
- Manuel Lujan Jr., secretary of the interior, (announced December 22, 1988)
- Elizabeth Dole, secretary of labor (announced December 24, 1988)
- Samuel K. Skinner, secretary of transportation (announced December 22, 1988)
- Ed Derwinski, secretary of veterans affairs (announced December 22, 1988)
- William K. Reilly, administrator of the Environmental Protection Agency (announced December 22, 1988)
- William Bennett, director of the Office of National Drug Control Policy (announced January 12, 1989)

==== Economic policy ====
- Robert Mosbacher, secretary of commerce
- Nicholas F. Brady, secretary of the treasury incumbent officeholder
- Michael Boskin, chair of the Council of Economic Advisers
- Carla Hills, United States trade representative
- David Mulford, under secretary of the treasury for international affairs (announced January 14, 1989)
- Charles Dallara, assistant secretary of the treasury for international affairs (announced January 14, 1989)
- Hollis S. McLoughlin, assistant secretary of the treasury for policy development (announced January 14, 1989)
- Edith E. Holiday, general counsel to the Department of the Treasury (announced January 14, 1989)

==== White House staff ====
- John Sununu, White House chief of staff (announced November 17, 1988)
- Marlin Fitzwater, White House press secretary

==== Other ====
- Richard Darman, director of the Office of Management and Budget (announced November 21, 1988)
- Anna Maria Perez, press secretary for the First Lady (announced January 14, 1989)

== Analysis of transition ==
In early March 1989, it was reported that many experts argued that Bush's transition, and the first two weeks of his presidency, had both been lackluster.

Some have retrospectively characterized the transition as having been somewhat bumpy, In March 2001, Stephen Hess of the Brookings Institution wrote that the transition had been "uneasy".

Some have given the transition great praise. In 2020, academic Barbara A. Perry gave it as an example of a "good" presidential transition. In 2000, journalist Jonathan Weisman of The Baltimore Sun called it "among the best transition teams".

== See also ==
- George H. W. Bush 1988 presidential campaign
- Inauguration of George H. W. Bush
