= J. William Middendorf =

American diplomat (1924–2025)

William Middendorf
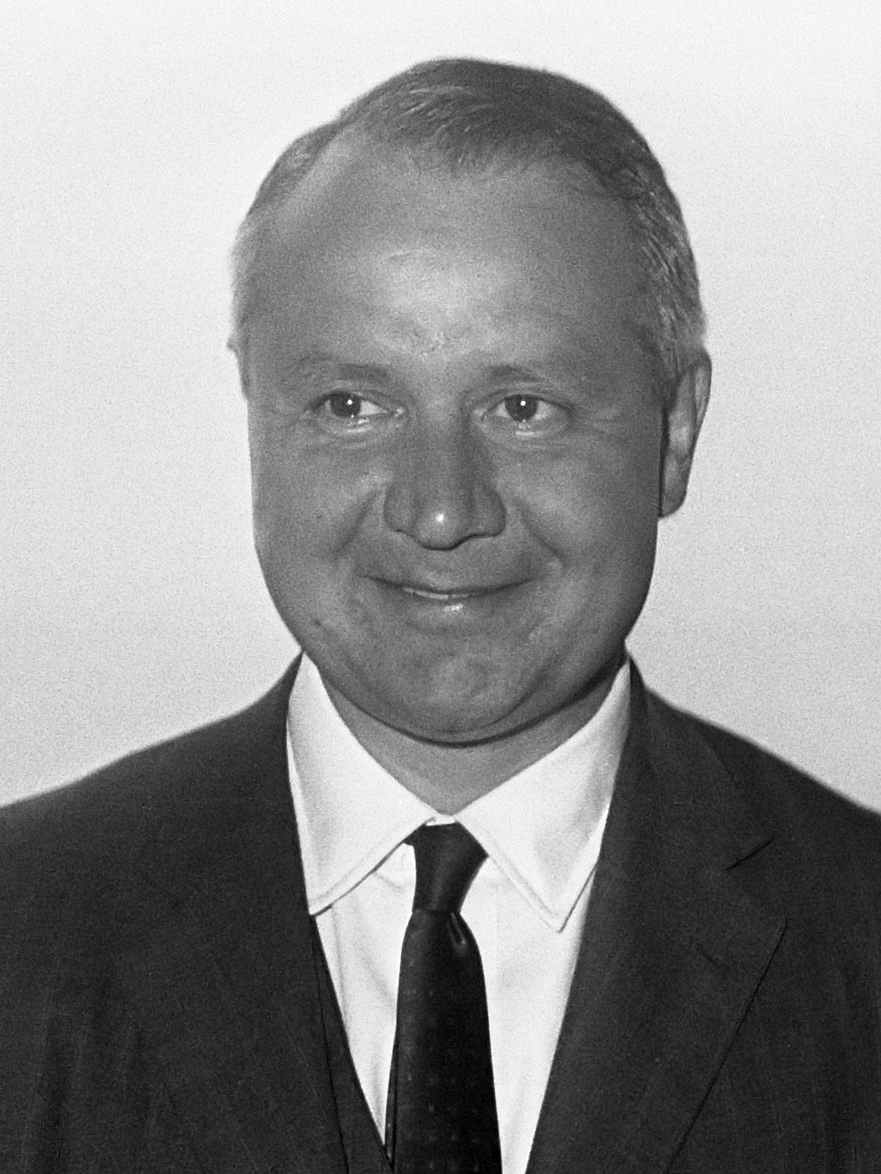
- Middendorf in 1969

United States Ambassador to the European Communities
- In office July 12, 1985 – February 1, 1987
- President: Ronald Reagan
- Preceded by: George S. Vest
- Succeeded by: Alfred H. Kingon

10th United States Ambassador to the Organization of American States
- In office July 1, 1981 – June 20, 1985
- President: Ronald Reagan
- Preceded by: Gale W. McGee
- Succeeded by: Richard T. McCormack

62nd United States Secretary of the Navy
- In office April 8, 1974 – January 20, 1977
- President: Richard Nixon; Gerald Ford
- Preceded by: John Warner
- Succeeded by: W. Graham Claytor Jr.

Under Secretary of the Navy
- In office August 3, 1973 – June 20, 1974
- President: Richard Nixon
- Preceded by: Frank P. Sanders
- Succeeded by: David S. Potter

United States Ambassador to the Netherlands
- In office July 9, 1969 – June 10, 1973
- President: Richard Nixon
- Preceded by: William R. Tyler
- Succeeded by: Kingdon Gould Jr.

Personal details
- Born: John William Middendorf II; September 22, 1924 Baltimore, Maryland, U.S.
- Died: October 24, 2025 (aged 101) Fall River, Massachusetts, U.S.
- Party: Republican
- Spouse: Isabelle Paine
- Children: 2, including John
- Education: College of the Holy Cross (BS); Harvard University (BA); New York University (MBA)

Military service
- Allegiance: United States
- Branch: United States Navy
- Service years: 1944–1946
- Conflict: World War II

John William Middendorf II (September 22, 1924 – October 24, 2025) was an American diplomat who was the 62nd Secretary of the Navy from 1974 to 1977 and the United States Ambassador to the European Communities from 1985 to 1987. He wrote books and articles on politics, security, and history.

== Early life ==
John William Middendorf II was born in Baltimore, Maryland, on September 22, 1924. He attended Gilman School and Middlesex School, where he was on the rowing team. He graduated in 1943. He was 17 when the attack on Pearl Harbor brought the United States into World War II.

== Education and military service ==
Middendorf received a Bachelor of Naval Science (BNS) degree from the College of the Holy Cross in 1945. In World War II, he served in the United States Navy from 1944 to 1946 as engineer officer and navigator aboard USS LCS(L) 53. He was discharged from the Navy in 1946.

He earned a Bachelor of Arts degree from Harvard College in 1947, where he was a member of the Hasty Pudding Theatricals and the Owl Club. He also graduated from New York University's Graduate School of Business Administration, receiving an MBA degree in 1954.

== Early career ==
Middendorf became an investment banker and in 1963 in partnership with Austen Colgate formed his own company, Middendorf, Colgate and Company (with a seat on the New York Stock Exchange). An early member of Barry Goldwater's presidential campaign, he served as treasurer of that campaign, and continued to have the same duties with the Republican National Committee from 1965 to 1969.

== Government service ==
Shortly after taking office in 1969, President Richard Nixon appointed Middendorf as United States Ambassador to the Netherlands. Middendorf served in this position until June 1973. After returning to the U.S., he became Under Secretary of the Navy; not long after, Secretary John Warner moved on to become head of the Bicentennial Commission, and Middendorf was told he could expect promotion to Secretary. However, when his nomination seemed to be stalled, he discovered that Secretary of Defense James Schlesinger had a candidate of his own (information that Schlesinger had not shared with Middendorf). Whereupon, Middendorf paid a personal call on many of the senators he had worked with while he was Treasurer of the Republican Party—and soon enough he had been nominated and confirmed as Secretary of the Navy, serving until the end of the administration of President Gerald Ford. As he would later write, "Life is relationships. Politics is compromise."

During his tenure and again using his legislative contacts, Middendorf helped increase the Navy budget by 60 percent while the U.S. Army and U.S. Air Force budgets remained relatively flat. Programs he championed included the Ohio-class submarine and the companion Trident missile, the Aegis surface-launched missile system (which became the Navy's longest-running construction program; the 100th Aegis-equipped ship was delivered to the U.S. Navy in 2009 and systems are now in service with five allied navies). He also championed the F/A-18 Hornet carrier-based fighter attack aircraft—which Middendorf arranged to have dubbed "Hornet", as a tribute to his Revolutionary War ancestor merchant-shipping Captain William Stone, who donated two ships to the fledgling Navy which were then renamed "Wasp" and "Hornet". Those names survived many years and many ships, but as the fleet began to shrink and as ship-naming became more political—i.e., breaking the old rules and naming ships after living politicians—there weren't enough new candidates for traditional names.

Incoming President Jimmy Carter invited Middendorf to stay on as Secretary of the Navy; however, as Middendorf noted in his 2011 memoir Potomac Fever, he told the President-elect "that it was the best job in government and therefore an insecure post for a Republican in a Democratic administration." During the Carter presidency, Middendorf was back in the private sector, as President and Chief Executive Officer of Financial General Bankshares (which he re-organized and renamed First American Bank). Next, he headed the CIA transition team (1980) for incoming President Ronald Reagan and was then named Permanent Representative of the United States of America to the Organization of American States (OAS), with the rank of Ambassador. He served in the post until 1984, when he accepted appointment as U. S. Representative to the European Communities (known today as the European Union) serving until 1987.

== Other pursuits and interests ==
In 2006, Middendorf published a book describing his work with the Goldwater campaign. Glorious Disaster: Barry Goldwater's Presidential Campaign and the Origins of the Conservative Movement details how Goldwater's campaign became the foundation of the modern Conservative movement.

In 2011, he published his autobiography, Potomac Fever.

He composed eight symphonies (including the Holland Symphony, presented to Queen Juliana of the Netherlands on the 25th anniversary of her ascension to the throne) and numerous marches for Navy and Marine Corps bands.

Ambassador Middendorf was a member of the board of directors of the International Republican Institute. He was a member of the board of trustees for The Heritage Foundation, an influential Washington, D.C.–based public policy research institute.

Middendorf studied stained glass production with Dutch-born expert Joep Nicolas. He was on the board of the New York Studio School of Drawing, Painting and Sculpture.

== Personal life and death ==
Middendorf married Isabelle Paine. They had a daughter, Frances, and a son, John. He died in Fall River, Massachusetts, on October 24, 2025, at the age of 101.

== Honors and awards ==
=== Domestic decorations and medals ===

- Superior Honor Award, U.S. Department of State, 1974
- Department of Defense Medal for Distinguished Public Service, 1975; bronze palm (second award), 1976
- Navy Distinguished Public Service Award, 1976
- American Campaign Medal
- Asiatic-Pacific Campaign Medal with two battle stars
- World War II Victory Medal
- Navy Occupation Medal with "ASIA" clasp
- China Service Medal

=== Foreign orders, decorations and medals ===

- Grand Officer of Order of Orange-Nassau, The Netherlands, 1985
- Order of the Arab Republic of Egypt – Rank A (highest foreign decoration) by President Sadat
- Grand Officer of the Order of Naval Merit – Republic of Brazil, 1974
- Naval Distinguished Service Medal, Brazil, 1976

=== Other awards ===
Middendorf has received the "Edwin Franko Goldman Award" from the American Bandmasters Association and was a member of the American Society of Composers and Performers (ASCAP). Other honors include:

- Hudson River Museum Honoree, Hudson River Museum, 2009
- Maritime Security Lifetime Excellence Award, 2002
- Arleigh Burke Award – Navy League of the United States, 1998
- Ludwig von Mises Free Market Award – 1985
- Distinguished Service Award, Purdue University Band
- Gold Medal, The Netherlands Society of the Sons of American Revolution
- Medal of Honor, Midwest National Band and Orchestra Association
- Alumnus of the Year, New York University Graduate School of Business
- Association of Harvard Clubs of American Award (Music) (Keogh Award)
- NYU Eugene Keogh Award for Distinguished Public Service (1989)
- American Friends of Turkey Leadership Award, 1989
- Presidential Physical Fitness Award, 1990
- Distinguished Patriot Award, SAR of State of New York, 1975
- Award of Merit, Art League of Virginia (Portrait of Del), 1996
- U.S. Olympic Committee Gold Shield Award
- Gold Medal, Holland Society of New York, 1996
- American Bandmasters Association Edwin Franko Goldman Award
- American Music Award, Harvard Clubs

== Honorary degrees ==
- Troy State University – Doctor of Law
- School of the Ozarks – Doctor of Letters
- American Christian College – Doctor of Letters
- Francisco Marroquin University – Doctor of Social Sciences

== Bibliography ==
- J. William Middendorf II (October 23, 2006). A Glorious Disaster: Barry Goldwater's Presidential Campaign and the Origins of the Conservative Movement. Basic Books. ISBN 978-0-465-04573-0.
- J. William Middendorf II (October 15, 2020). The Great Nightfall: How We Win The New Cold War. Heritage Harbor Foundation. ISBN 978-0917012112. Archived from the original on October 7, 2020.

Diplomatic posts
Preceded by William R. Tyler	United States Ambassador to the Netherlands; 1969–1973	Succeeded by Kingdon Gould, Jr.
Preceded by Gale W. McGee	United States Ambassador to the Organization of American States; 1981–1985	Succeeded by Richard T. McCormack
Preceded by George S. Vest	United States Ambassador to the European Union; 1985–1987	Succeeded by Alfred H. Kingon
Government offices
Preceded by Frank P. Sanders	Under Secretary of the Navy; 1973–1974	Succeeded by David S. Potter
Preceded by John Warner	United States Secretary of the Navy; 1974–1977	Succeeded by W. Graham Claytor Jr.
