= Robert Teeter =

American pollster and political strategist

Bob Teeter

Personal details
- Born: February 5, 1939; Coldwater, Michigan, U.S.
- Died: May 13, 2004 (aged 65); Ann Arbor, Michigan, U.S.
- Political party: Republican
- Education: Albion College (BA); Michigan State University (MA)

Robert M. Teeter (February 5, 1939 – May 13, 2004) was an American Republican pollster and political campaign strategist.

== Biography ==
Born in Coldwater, Michigan, Teeter worked in various capacities for four presidents, and numerous governors and senators. Formerly the president of Market Opinion Research, he later founded an Ann Arbor, Michigan-based consulting firm, Coldwater Corporation. He also conducted a national polling program for NBC News and The Wall Street Journal.

He graduated from Albion College in 1961 and also served on its board of trustees. He earned a master's degree from Michigan State University. He also served on the board of directors for UPS, Visteon Corporation, Kaydon Corporation and the Bank of Ann Arbor, as well as the University of Michigan Business School's William Davidson Institute and the Fair Lane Learning Institute. He also served as a member of the grant screening committee at the Gerald R. Ford Library in Grand Rapids.

Teeter was co-director of the presidential transition of George H. W. Bush.

He died in Ann Arbor from cancer.
