= Nick Luna =

American political aide

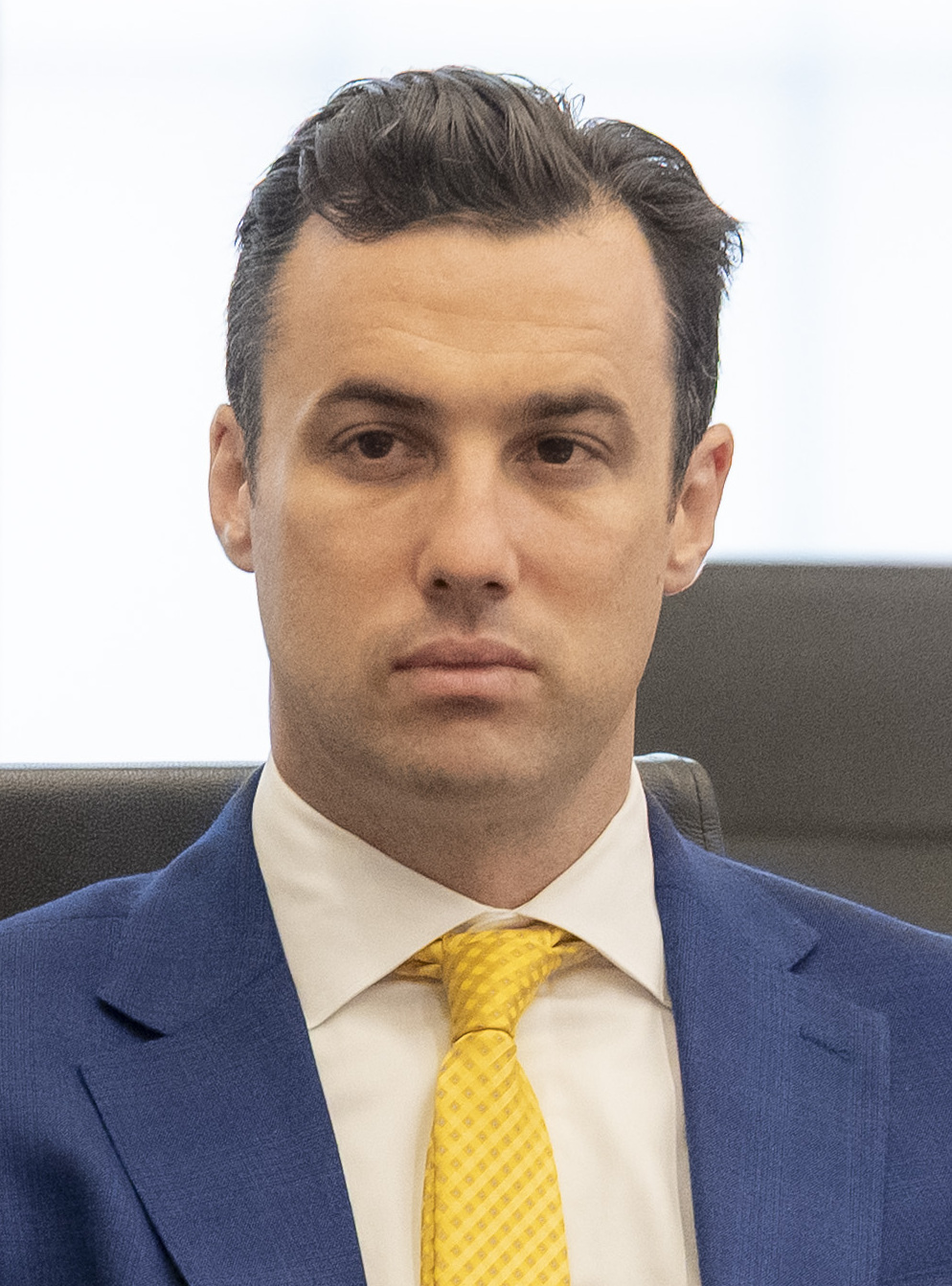
- Luna in 2025

Chief of Staff to the Vice President
- Incumbent
- Assumed office August 2026
- Vice President: JD Vance
- Preceded by: Jacob Reses

White House Deputy Chief of Staff for Strategic Implementation
- In office January 20, 2025 – August 2026
- President: Donald Trump
- Preceded by: Natalie Quillian
- Succeeded by: Vacant

Director of Oval Office Operations
- In office April 21, 2020 – January 20, 2021
- President: Donald Trump
- Preceded by: Madeleine Westerhout
- Succeeded by: Annie Tomasini

Personal details
- Spouse: Cassidy Dumbauld (m. 2020)
- Education: Vanderbilt University (BS)

Nicholas Luna is an American political aide who has served as the chief of staff to the vice president of the United States since 2026. Luna served as the White House deputy chief of staff for strategic implementation from 2025 to 2026 and as the director of Oval Office Operations from 2020 to 2021.

In February 2019, Luna was named as deputy assistant to the president for operations and a personal aide to the president. He was named as the director of Oval Office Operations in April. Luna remained with Trump after the January 6 Capitol attack and worked for CIC Ventures. In January 2025, Trump named Luna as the White House deputy chief of staff for strategic implementation.

== Early life and education ==
Nicholas Francisco Luna was born July 15, 1987. He attended Vanderbilt University from 2007 to 2010, graduating with a BASc in political science and government.

== Political aide in first Trump administration (2019–2021) ==
In February 2019, Luna was named as a personal aide to the president. As a personal aide, he was photographed carrying printed materials, including newspapers, for Donald Trump. Luna was named as director of Oval Office Operations in April. By February 2019, Luna was dating Cassidy Dumbauld, an assistant to Jared Kushner; they married in September 2020. Bloomberg News reported the following month that Luna had contracted COVID-19. Luna remained in the White House following the January 6 Capitol attack.

Luna was present in the Oval Office when Trump pressured vice president Mike Pence to refuse to certify the 2020 presidential election. He was later subpoenaed in November 2021, by the House Select Committee to Investigate the January 6th Attack on the United States Capitol, in an effort by the panel to document Trump's actions on the day of the attack.

In December 2020, Luna was named by Trump as a member of the United States Holocaust Memorial Council alongside Andrew Giuliani and Mitch Webber.

== Work outside of government (2021–2024) ==
Luna was named as a co-director of CIC Ventures alongside John Marion, a Trump lawyer. In 2021, in an interview with The New York Times, Luna stated that he had not been involved in the company in over a year by December 2022.

In June 2024, amid the 2024 Republican Party vice presidential candidate selection, the Trump presidential campaign and the Republican National Committee named Luna their director of VP operations.

== Second Trump administration ==
=== White House deputy chief of staff for strategic implementation (2025–2026) ===
On January 4, 2025, Trump named Luna as the White House deputy chief of staff for strategic implementation.

=== Chief of Staff to the Vice President (2026–present) ===
In June 2026, Punchbowl News reported that Luna had been named to serve as the chief of staff to the vice president of the United States, JD Vance, succeeding Jacob Reses. He was appointed to the position the following month.

== Personal life ==
In 2020, Luna married Cassidy Dumbauld.

== Works cited ==
=== Articles ===
- Broadwater, Luke; Mazzetti, Mark (November 9, 2021). "At the Willard and the White House, the Jan. 6 Panel Widens Its Net". The New York Times.
- Bender, Michael; Haberman, Maggie (December 15, 2022). "Trump Sells a New Image as the Hero of $99 Trading Cards". The New York Times.
- "Federal Movers & Shakers". WFED. August 28, 2026.
- Gómez, Fin (October 4, 2020). "Trump's personal aide tests positive for virus". CBS News.
- Haberman, Maggie (April 21, 2020). "Dan Scavino Promoted as Meadows Shuffles White House Communications Team". The New York Times.
- Jacobs, Jennifer; Sink, Justin (October 3, 2020). "Trump Bodyman Tests Positive for Virus in New White House Case". Bloomberg News.
- Karni, Annie (January 8, 2021). "As Circle of Trump Aides Dwindles, a Few Plan to Stay to the End". The New York Times.
- Lippman, Daniel (July 29, 2019). "The print reader in chief: Inside Trump's retro media diet". Politico.
- Montague, Zach (December 16, 2020). "Trump taps Giuliani's son for membership on the Holocaust Memorial Council". The New York Times.
- Rogers, Katie (February 17, 2020). "Young, Conservative and Working for Trump? The Dating Pool Is Small". The New York Times.
- Timotija, Filip (January 4, 2025). "Trump announces additional senior White House officials". The Hill.
- "Vance's new chief of staff". Punchbowl News. June 16, 2026.

=== Documents ===
- "President Donald J. Trump Announces Appointments for the Executive Office of the President" (Document). White House. February 2, 2019.

Political offices
Preceded by Jacob Reses	Chief of Staff to the Vice President; 2026–present	Incumbent
