= Daniel J. Murphy =

United States Navy admiral

Daniel Murphy
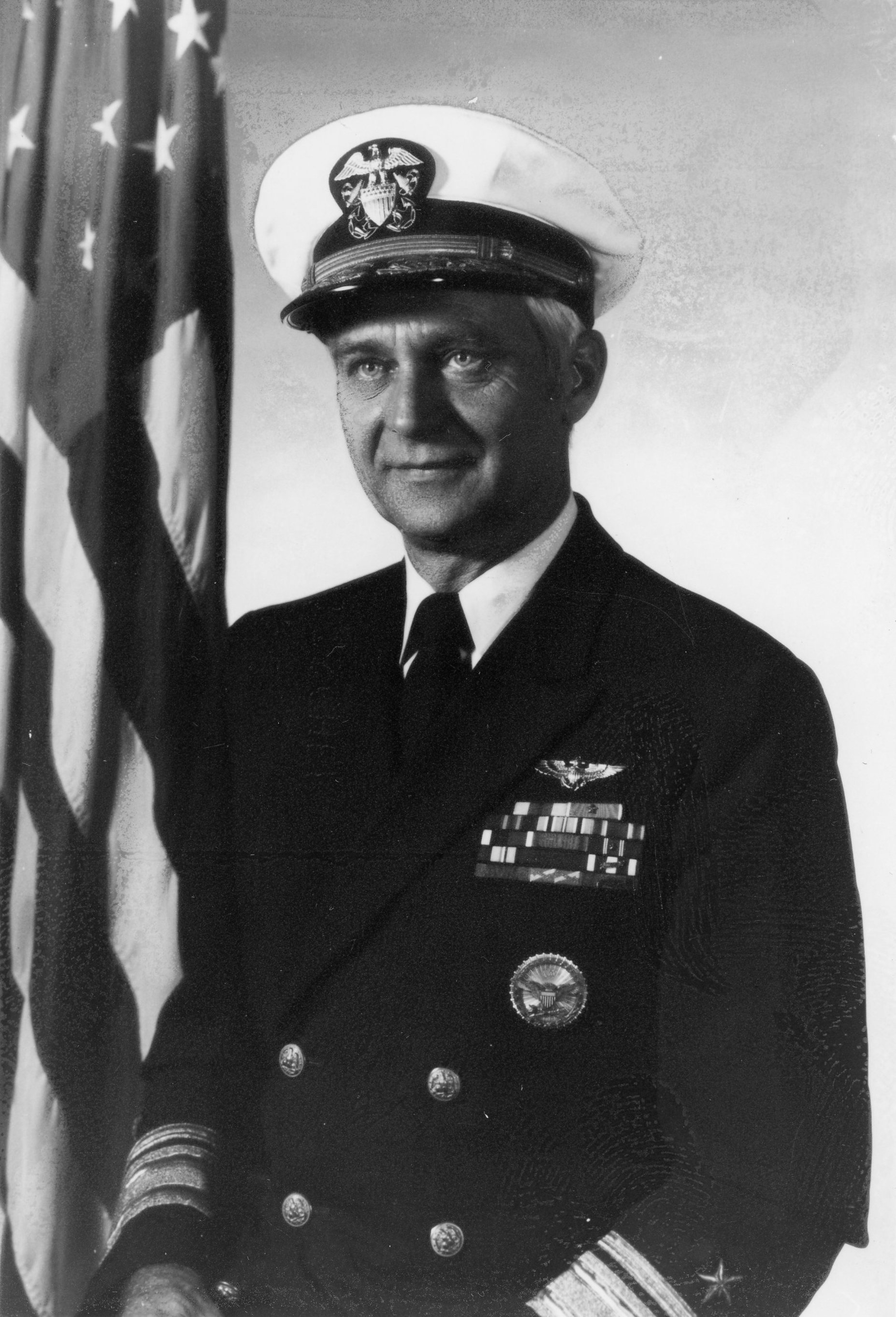
- Pictured as a rear admiral in 1973
- Born: March 24, 1922; Brooklyn, New York City, U.S.
- Died: September 21, 2001 (aged 79); Rockville, Maryland, U.S.
- Burial place: Arlington National Cemetery
- Military career
- Allegiance: United States of America
- Branch: United States Navy
- Service years: 1943–1977
- Rank: Admiral
- Commands: Sixth Fleet; USS Bennington
- Conflicts: World War II; Vietnam War
- Awards: Defense Distinguished Service Medal; Distinguished Service Medal; Legion of Merit (2)

Assistant to the President Chief of Staff to the Vice President
- In office January 20, 1981 – January 20, 1985
- President: Ronald Reagan
- Vice President: George H. W. Bush
- Preceded by: Richard Moe
- Succeeded by: Craig L. Fuller

Daniel Joseph Murphy Sr. (March 24, 1922 – September 21, 2001) was a four-star admiral in the United States Navy and an official in the Carter and Reagan administrations.

Murphy grew up in Brooklyn, and graduated from the University of Maryland and the Naval War College. He joined the Navy in 1943, during his second year at St. John's University in New York, and flew anti-submarine patrols over the North Atlantic during World War II.

During the 1960s he was commanding officer of the aircraft carrier USS Bennington. He commanded the Sixth Fleet in the Mediterranean during the Arab-Israeli War of 1973 and the Cyprus crisis of 1974. He retired from active service in 1977. Murphy's son, Vice Admiral Daniel J. Murphy Jr., later also commanded the Sixth Fleet, from 1998 to 2000.

Murphy was principal military assistant to successive Secretaries of Defense Melvin R. Laird and Elliot Richardson, deputy director of the CIA in 1976 and 1977, and Deputy Under Secretary of Defense for Policy at the Pentagon from 1977 to 1980 under Jimmy Carter.

He was Vice President George H. W. Bush's chief of staff from 1981 to 1985. During this period, a covert team of military operatives led by Vice-Admiral Arthur S. Moreau Jr. was sometimes run out of his office. His involvement in the Iran-Contra affair may have been greater than was realised at the time.

At the end of Ronald Reagan's first term, Murphy left government to join the Washington D.C. lobbying and public relations firm Gray and Company (later Hill & Knowlton Worldwide) as a vice chairman. He later founded Murphy & Associates in Georgetown providing public affairs and consulting support to U.S. and international firms. He facilitated former president George H.W. Bush's celebratory visit to Kuwait in 1993.

He died at the age of 79 in 2001 of a stomach aneurysm. He was buried at Arlington National Cemetery.

Military offices
Preceded by Gerald E. Miller	Commander-in-Chief of the United States Sixth Fleet; June 1973–September 1974	Succeeded by Frederick C. Turner
Political offices
Preceded by Richard Moe	Chief of Staff to the Vice President of the United States; 1981–1985	Succeeded by Craig L. Fuller
