= Presidential transition of Herbert Hoover =

Transfer of presidential power from Calvin Coolidge to Herbert Hoover

Presidential transition of Hebert Hoover
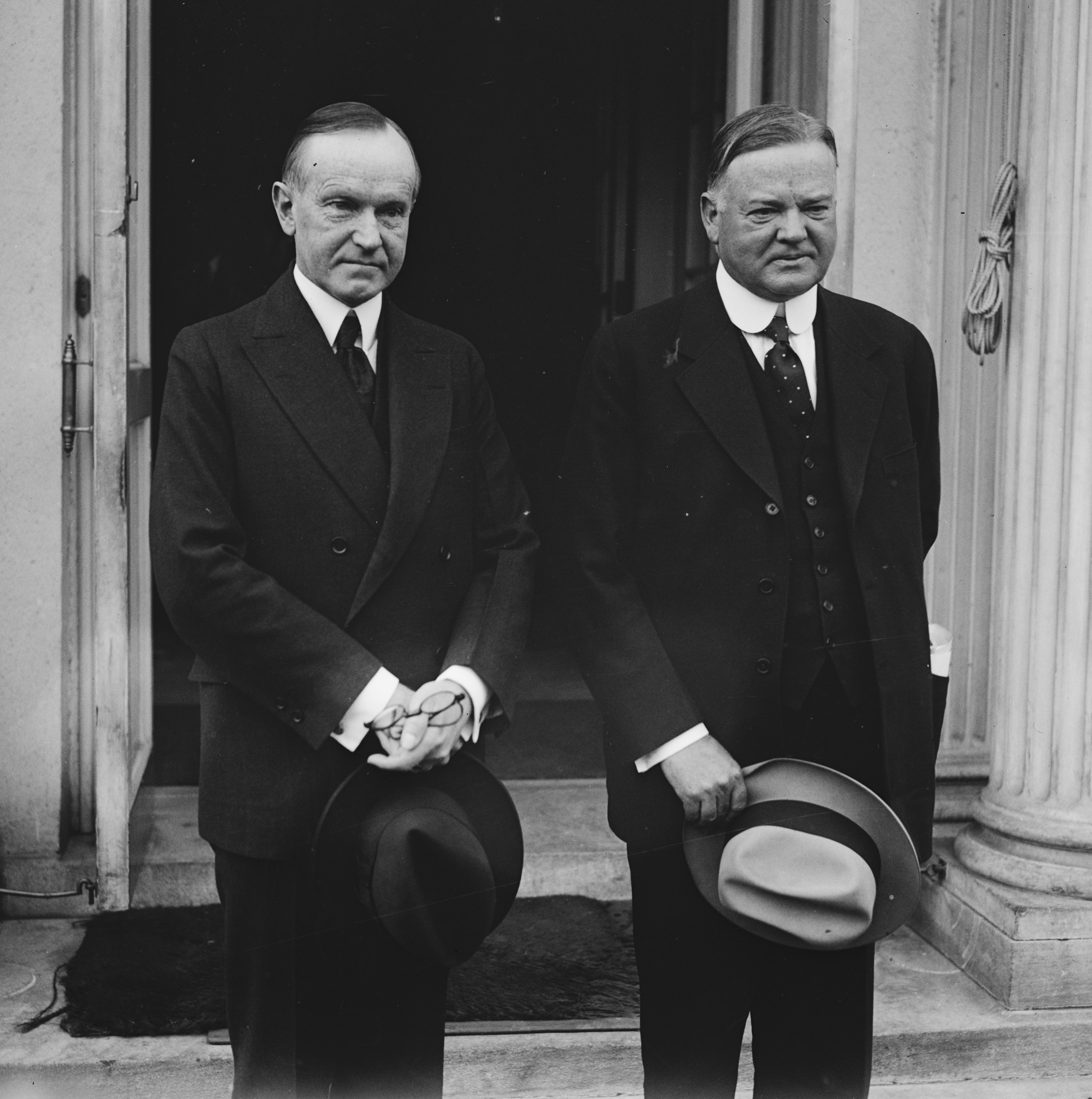
- President Calvin Coolidge (left) and President-elect Herbert Hoover (right) together on Hoover's inauguration day
- Election date: November 6, 1928
- Inauguration date: March 4, 1929
- President-elect: Herbert Hoover (Republican)
- Vice president-elect: Charles Curtis (Republican)
- Outgoing president: Calvin Coolidge (Republican)
- Outgoing vice president: Charles G. Dawes (Republican)

The presidential transition of Herbert Hoover began when he won the United States 1928 United States presidential election, becoming the president-elect, and ended when Hoover was inaugurated on March 4, 1929.

Hoover took a "goodwill trip" to Latin America during his transition, in hopes of improving relations between the United States and nations in the region.

Hoover, largely, did not begin focusing on shaping his administration until the final two weeks of his transition. At the time that Hoover's occurred, presidential transitions were much less complex than they are today. The term "presidential transition" had not even begun to be widely applied to the period between an individual's election as president of the United States and their assumption of the office.

== "Friendly takeover" ==
The transition was an example of a "friendly takeover", in which the outgoing president and the president-elect were of the same political party (Republican). It would be the last such transition until the 1988–89 presidential transition of George H. W. Bush.

== Secret Service protection ==
Beginning on November 7, the day after the election, the newly minted president-elect and his family were given protection by the United States Secret Service.

== Economy ==
While the stock market would crash months into Hoover's presidency, starting the Great Depression, the performance of the economy during his transition appeared strong. Among United States presidential transitions, the stock market performed stronger than it had during a presidential transition for decades. The growth of the Dow Jones Industrial Average had experienced during Hoover's presidential transition (21.8%) would not be exceeded by any United States presidential transition until the first presidential transition of Donald Trump.

== Latin American tour ==
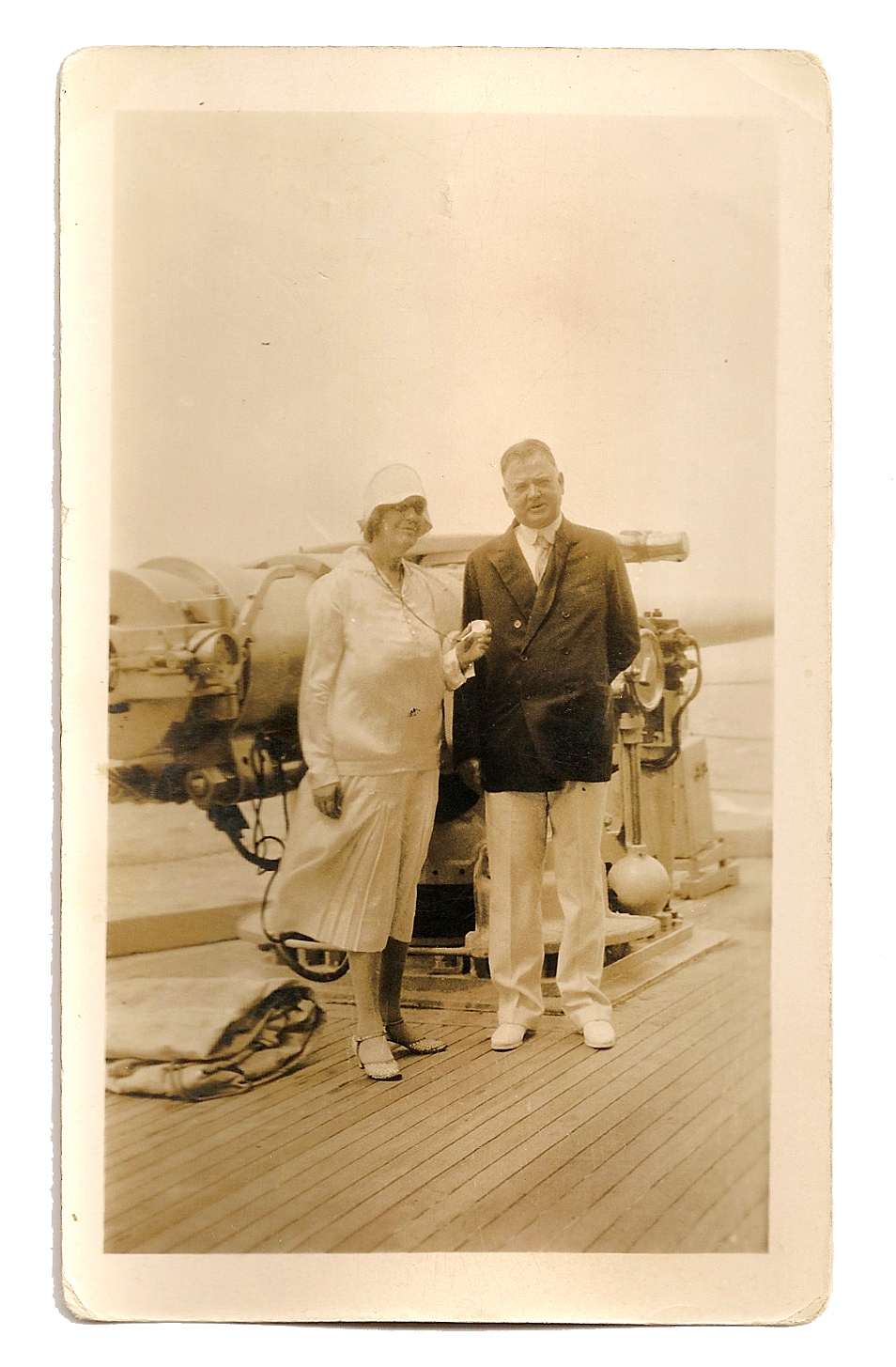
President-elect Hoover and his wife aboard the USS Utah in South America, December, 1928.

On November 19, 1928, President-elect Hoover embarked on a ten-nation goodwill tour of Latin America, first departing from San Pedro, in Los Angeles, California aboard the USS Maryland. He was accompanied on the trip by his wife Lou Henry Hoover. He delivered twenty-five speeches, stressing his plans to reduce American political and military interference in Latin American affairs. In sum, he pledged that the United States would act as a "good neighbor."

Hoover's work as United States secretary of commerce had led him to view Latin America as important, and believe that there was need to improve relations. Hoover began planning the trip soon after winning the election. It was the first time that a president-elect had taken such a goodwill trip abroad. Hoover also planned the trip as means of staying away from Washington, D.C., avoiding men seeking to lobby for patronage posts.

The administration of outgoing president Calvin Coolidge lent their support to Hoover's plans to take this trip. Henry P. Fletcher accompanied Hoover on the trip, serving as official advisor to the president-elect as well as a representative of Coolidge and the Department of State. Coolidge ordered that Hoover should be treated with presidential honors on his trip, despite Hoover having not yet entered the office.

While crossing the Andes from Chile, a plot by Argentine anarchists to bomb Hoover's train as it crossed the vast Argentinian central plain was foiled. The group of plotters were led by Severino Di Giovanni. The bomber was arrested before he could place the explosives on the rails. Hoover professed unconcern, tearing off the front page of a newspaper that revealed the plot and explaining, "It's just as well that Lou shouldn't see it," referring to his wife.

During his travels, he delivered roughly 25 speeches. Public reception in the United States of Hoover's trip was largely positive.

About the trip, he said in his memoirs:

Finally Mr. Coolidge put the battleship Maryland at my disposal going south; and the battleship Utah met us at Montevideo and brought us home. We were accompanied by Henry P. Fletcher, former Under Secretary of State, and John Mott, a leading California lawyer, as a special interpreter and some of our best press correspondents—about twenty of them, including my old friends Mark Sullivan and Will Irwin.

We visited Honduras, Salvador, Nicaragua, Costa Rica, Ecuador, Peru, Chile, Argentina, Uruguay, and Brazil. I met with the President of Bolivia and I had intended to visit Mexico and Cuba later on. We had a real welcome accompanied by parades, banquets, receptions, and speeches. Our Latin neighbors have an exquisite politeness and hospitality. Their leaders are usually understanding and eloquent men.

Some incidents added interest to the journey. In Nicaragua Mr. Coolidge had indirectly imposed a presidential election to stop a civil war, and had it conducted by our Marines. When the Marines registered the voters, they required each registrant to dip a finger in a chemical solution which stained it yellow. At election a few days later only the yellow fingers might vote, and as they left the polls on election day voters were required to dip another finger in a red solution. Thus repeaters were eliminated. I asked the Marine officer in charge where he got that idea. He replied, “I lived once in Tammany New York and proposed it as a cure for one of Tammany’s bad habits, but everybody said it would be insulting.”

As a result of the election the incumbent President had been defeated. Our diplomatic representatives informed me that he was not going to give up his office peaceably. Therefore, I invited the President elect and the outgoing President to lunch on the Maryland. Neither President wanted to refuse the invitation, but as one of the naval officers observed in mixed metaphor, “They stepped around like fighting cocks making dog-eyes at each other.” I found they were both delightful and intellectual men. I did not assume any friction, but we talked at length upon the problems of their country and the need of a reputation for orderly government. I announced that we were going to withdraw our troops and invited them both to visit the United States. In any event, there was no further revolution, for a while. President Gonzalez Viquez of Costa Rica possessed a fine sense of humor. We were reviewing a parade of the military and civic bodies when he pointed to the 150 soldiers and a military band of 150 pieces and remarked: “That is our total armed force except for another military band. You will observe the variety and expressiveness of the uniforms. But we have 1,800 schoolteachers. They arc much more important in maintaining public order.”

Arriving by train at Buenos Aires from Santiago, we were met by President Irigoyen. To prevent Communist outbreaks and to hold back the large crowd of civilians, three lines of protection had been provided along the station platform—police, soldiers, and firemen, one behind another, apparently under separate command. After we had alighted and shaken hands with the President and important officials something went wrong, for the whole platform turned into a seething jam with civilians crowding among the guards. President Irigoyen was pushed about, and his coat ripped up the back, at which he became properly excited. Our naval aides kept Mrs. Hoover and me from being crushed.

Dates	Country	Locations	Details
November 26, 1928	Honduras	Amapala	Met with President-elect Vicente Mejía Colindres and Foreign Minister Augusto Coello. Departed the U.S. November 19, 1928.
November 26, 1928	El Salvador	Cutuco	Met with Minister of Foreign Affairs Francisco Martínez Suárez.
November 27, 1928	Nicaragua	Corinto	Met with President Adolfo Díaz and President-elect José María Moncada.
November 28, 1928	Costa Rica	San José	Met with President Cleto González Víquez.
December 1, 1928	Ecuador	Guayaquil	Met with President Isidro Ayora.
December 5, 1928	Peru	Lima	Met with President Augusto B. Leguía.
December 8–11, 1928	Chile	Antofagasta, Santiago	Met with President Carlos Ibáñez del Campo. Met with Bolivian diplomats to discuss the ongoing Tacna–Arica dispute.
December 13–15, 1928	Argentina	Buenos Aires	Met with President Hipólito Yrigoyen. Also reported to President Coolidge on the success of his tour via telegraph.
December 16–18, 1928	Uruguay	Montevideo	Met with President Juan Campisteguy, and addressed the National Council of Administration.
December 21–23, 1928	Brazil	Rio de Janeiro	Met with President Washington Luís; addressed the National Congress and the Supreme Federal Court. Returned to U.S. January 6, 1929.

== Vacation in Florida ==
After Hoover returned from his Latin American trip, he avoided the press and patronage seekers by vacationing in Florida until February 19. Hoover was in little hurry to begin preparing to take office. Presidential transitions were much less complex when Hoover took office than they have been in more recent decades.

== Shaping of Hoover's administration ==
After his Florida vacation, Hoover began the business of shaping his administration in the final two weeks of his transition period.

Hoover retained two members of Coolidge's Cabinet. One was Secretary of the Treasury Andrew W. Mellon, whom, per the later recounting of historian David Bruner, Hoover retained in order to avoid a reaction on Wall Street, as the financial sector held Mellon in strong esteem. The other was Secretary of Labor James J. Davis, who was retained, per Bruner's accounting, in order for Hoover to avoid the pressure to appoint John L. Lewis to the position.
