= Lorraine Voles =

American political advisor

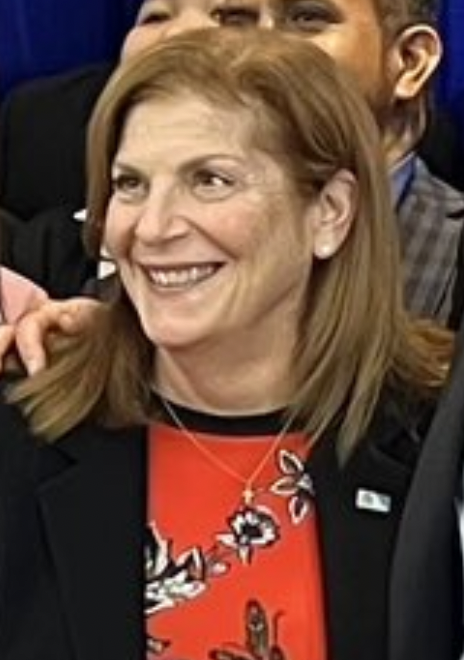
- Voles in 2023

Assistant to the President Chief of Staff to the Vice President of the United States
- In office May 16, 2022 – January 20, 2025
- Vice President: Kamala Harris
- Preceded by: Hartina Flournoy
- Succeeded by: Jacob Reses

Communications Director for the Vice President
- In office November 8, 1993 – December 4, 1997
- Vice President: Al Gore
- Preceded by: Marla Romash
- Succeeded by: Larry Haas

White House Deputy Press Secretary
- In office January 25, 1993 – November 8, 1993 Serving with Arthur Jones
- President: Bill Clinton
- Preceded by: Michael Busch
- Succeeded by: Ginny Terzano

Personal details
- Born: January 15, 1959 (age 67) New York City, New York, U.S.
- Party: Democratic
- Spouse: Daniel Smith (m. 1992)
- Education: George Washington University (BA, MA)

Lorraine Ann Voles (born January 15, 1959) is an American political advisor who served as chief of staff to the vice president of the United States under Kamala Harris from 2022 to 2025.

== Education ==
Voles's father is Joseph A. Voles, from Cambridge, Massachusetts.

Voles earned a Bachelor of Arts degree in journalism and a Master of Arts in organizational leadership from the George Washington University.

== Career ==
Voles worked for the Walter Mondale 1984 presidential campaign and Michael Dukakis 1988 presidential campaign. She also worked as a project manager for the Natural Resources Defense Council and served as deputy White House press secretary during the first year of the Clinton administration. She also worked as press secretary for Iowa senator Tom Harkin. From 1993 to 1997, she served as director of communications for Vice President Al Gore. From 1998 to 2006, Voles worked as an independent communications consultant for organizations including Porter Novelli, the Smithsonian Institution, EMILY's List, and the Democratic National Committee. In 2006 and 2007, she served as director of communications for then-Senator Hillary Clinton. From 2007 to 2009, she was the senior vice president of Fannie Mae for communications and marketing. She was also the vice president of George Washington University for external relations from 2009 to 2020. In the summer of 2021, Voles joined the Office of the Vice President of the United States as a senior advisor and was promoted to chief of staff in April 2022.

== Personal life ==
In 1992, Voles married Daniel Edward Smith, a lawyer and native of Buffalo Center, Iowa. Smith worked for the Al Gore 1988 presidential campaign, American Cancer Society, and various members of the United States Senate before founding an independent consulting firm.
