= Marc Short =

American politician (born 1970)

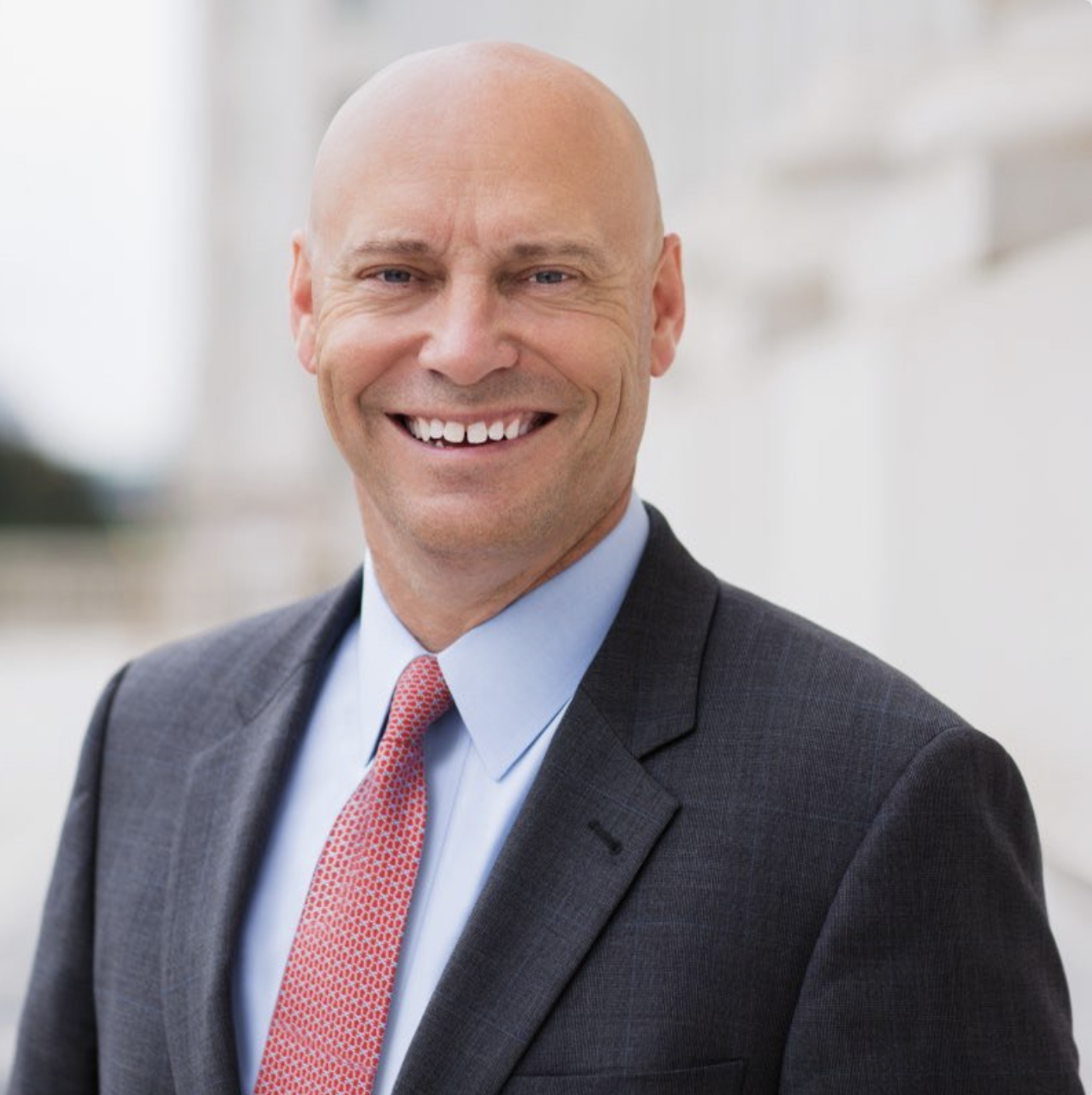
- Short in 2022

Chief of Staff to the Vice President
- In office March 1, 2019 – January 20, 2021
- Vice President: Mike Pence
- Preceded by: Nick Ayers
- Succeeded by: Hartina Flournoy

White House Director of Legislative Affairs
- In office January 20, 2017 – July 20, 2018
- President: Donald Trump
- Preceded by: Amy Rosenbaum
- Succeeded by: Shahira Knight

Personal details
- Born: March 3, 1970 (age 56) Virginia, U.S.
- Party: Republican
- Spouse: Kristen Short
- Children: 3
- Parent: Dick Short
- Education: Washington and Lee University (BA); University of Virginia (MBA)

Marc T. Short (born March 3, 1970) is an American political advisor who was chief of staff to Vice President Mike Pence. Prior to holding this role, Short was the director of legislative affairs at the White House from 2017 to 2018. He became chief of staff for Pence in March 2019. He was a senior fellow at the Miller Center of Public Affairs, a CNN contributor, chief of staff to Senator Kay Bailey Hutchison, and the House Republican Conference. He was president of Freedom Partners Chamber of Commerce from 2011 to 2016. He was a frequent guest on Meet The Press of NBC News.

== Early life and education ==
Marc Short was born in Virginia, the son of Richard T. "Dick" Short III, an insurance executive, and his wife Florence "Kim" Timolat Short. The family lived "in a comfortable waterfront home on the eastern tip of Virginia Beach’s Bay Island." He attended Norfolk Academy from grade school to high school, where he used as his senior quote "If you want the virtue of a woman, it is not difficult to describe; she must manage the home well, preserve its possessions, and be submissive to her husband."

He graduated from Washington and Lee University in 1992. While an undergraduate at Washington and Lee University, Short co-founded The Spectator in 1989, a conservative paper. He was editor until 1992, when he graduated. In a column for the paper, Short "disparaged people living with HIV and AIDS," stating "the propaganda campaign ignited by gay activists and carelessly perpetuated by journalists whose intent is to scare all heterosexuals into believing they are prime targets for contraction of the disease. The campaign's purpose is both to lobby Congress for more federal funding of AIDS research and to destigmatize the perverted lifestyles homosexuals pursue."

== Career ==
Short was finance director for Oliver North's unsuccessful 1994 Senate campaign in Virginia. He then worked as spokesperson and executive director for The Freedom Alliance. Short was also the executive director of Young America's Foundation. In 1998, the group purchased the Reagan Ranch in California, with the intention of using it for leadership seminars for college students. Short managed the property with his wife and got his start in fundraising from conservative donors. The Shorts then returned to Virginia, where he received his MBA from the University of Virginia.

Following his graduation, Short was hired as a spokesperson for the Department of Homeland Security. He then worked for Republican Senator Kay Bailey Hutchison, eventually becoming her chief of staff. When Hutchison ran for Governor of Texas, Short started working for then-Congressman Mike Pence, who named him chief of staff for the House Republican Conference in 2009. He remained in the position until 2011. Short was then hired by Koch Industries and eventually transitioned to become the President of Freedom Partners, a non-profit, 501(c)(6) chamber of commerce located in Arlington, Virginia that is largely funded by Charles and David Koch. He was the organization's president until 2016. In February 2016, Short left his position at Freedom Partners to start his own consulting firm. Among his clients were Marco Rubio's presidential campaign and Pence's Indiana gubernatorial campaign. Pence eventually withdrew from the gubernatorial race to become Trump's running mate. On June 16, 2016, Short was named Communications Advisor to then vice presidential candidate Pence.

=== Trump administration ===
President Trump named Short the Director of Legislative Affairs on January 4, 2017. Short announced he would leave the White House post in the summer of 2018, citing "diminishing returns" of pushing President Donald Trump's agenda. In July 2018, having left the White House, he joined GuidePost as a partner.

On February 19, 2019, Vice President Mike Pence announced Short would be his next Chief of Staff, beginning in March 2019.

On November 20, 2019, Short issued a statement rebutting the sworn testimony given that same day before Congress by US Ambassador to the European Union Gordon Sondland. Sondland claimed while meeting with Pence that the two discussed the alleged "quid pro quo" that was at the heart of the impeachment inquiry before the House. Marc Short wrote the vice president "never had a conversation with Gordon Sondland about investigating the Bidens, Burisma, or the conditional release of financial aid to Ukraine based upon potential investigations." Later that evening during Cuomo Prime Time, the statement was described as being well crafted and that it didn't deny that Pence already knew about Trump's requests.

During the coronavirus pandemic of 2020, Short played an important role on Vice President Mike Pence's coronavirus task force. During the response to the coronavirus pandemic, Short persistently downplayed the dangers of the pandemic, and criticized the data shared with Trump that modeled an estimated 100,000–240,000 U.S. deaths under a continuation of the administration's social distancing policies, and as many as 1.6 million–2.2 million U.S. deaths in the absence of any mitigation efforts. In internal White House discussions, Short said he did not believe that the U.S. death toll would ever go beyond 60,000. In internal discussions, Short also criticized the administration's public health response in a broader policy level, arguing that it damaged the economy and harmed Trump's re-election chances. He repeatedly encouraged others in the administration to re-open the economy amid the implementation of lockdown and social distancing efforts.

As Short and his wife hold stock in various pharmaceutical and medical companies connected with the Pence task force's work, this raised concerns of potential conflicts of interest.

On October 24, 2020, it was reported that Short and three other Pence aides had tested positive for COVID-19. The White House tried to prevent the information from becoming public.

In the aftermath of Biden winning the 2020 presidential election, the incumbent pressured vice-president Pence to reject State electors relying on the fringe theory presented in the Eastman memos. Short requested Jared Kushner's help in reasoning with president Trump. Although in basic agreement about the election outcome, Kushner replied that the vice president "is a big boy", and if he disagreed with the president on a legal issue, he should bring in his lawyers. Kushner stated: "I'm too busy working on Middle East peace right now, Marc". Short later worked with Pence's legal counsel Gregory Jacob to fortify Pence the constitutional response that he gave in the Joint Session of Congress in the 2021 United States Electoral College vote count.

On January 7, 2021, Short stated that Trump had banned him from entering the White House after Pence told lawmakers that he did not have the legal power to reject electoral votes.

On January 11, 2021, he helped senior presidential advisor Jared Kushner arrange a reconciliation meeting between vice-president Pence and president Donald Trump.

=== Advancing American Freedom ===
Advancing American Freedom was launched on April 7, 2021, as the policy and advocacy organization of former Vice President Mike Pence. The stated aim of Advancing American Freedom is to take North America back into the traditional foundations of freedom. The day that Advancing American Freedom was announced, Short was designated as a Co-Chair of the organization, a position he currently holds.

== Personal life ==
Marc and Kristen Short were married in 1997. They have three children and live in Arlington, Virginia. He is an evangelical Christian.

Political offices
Preceded by Nick Ayers	Chief of Staff to the Vice President; 2019–2021	Succeeded by Hartina Flournoy
