= Jacob Reses =

American political advisor

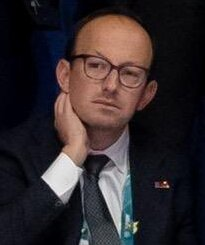

Chief of Staff to the Vice President
- In office January 20, 2025 – August 2026
- Vice President: JD Vance
- Preceded by: Lorraine Voles
- Succeeded by: Nick Luna

Personal details
- Born: Linwood, New Jersey, U.S.
- Party: Republican
- Education: Princeton University (BA); Stanford University (JD)

Jacob Reses is an American political advisor who served as the chief of staff to Vice President JD Vance from January 20, 2025 through August 2026. He previously served as chief of staff to Vance during his term in the United States Senate.

== Early life and education ==
Raised in Linwood, New Jersey, Reses attended Trocki Hebrew Academy, a Modern Orthodox Jewish day school in Margate, New Jersey. He attended Mainland Regional High School in Linwood, where he graduated as valedictorian. He later enrolled at Princeton University, where he majored in the School of Public and International Affairs. During his time at Princeton, Reses was actively involved in campus politics, serving as president of the College Republicans and contributing to student publications.

Reses was enrolled at Stanford Law School, where he was part of the university's chapter of the Federalist Society. In 2022, Vance asked him to be his chief of staff following Vance's election to the Senate that year, which required Reses to complete his JD as a visiting student at Georgetown University.

== Early political career ==
Reses began his career in conservative politics as an intern for the Daily Caller, a conservative news website founded by Tucker Carlson. He later served as senior policy advisor to Senator Josh Hawley.

== Chief of staff to JD Vance ==
In 2023, Reses was appointed chief of staff to then-Senator JD Vance, who represented Ohio in the United States Senate. In this capacity, Reses managed the senator's legislative agenda and staff operations.

Following JD Vance's election as vice president of the United States in 2024, Reses was appointed chief of staff to the vice president. In this role, he oversees the vice president's staff, manages the vice president's schedule, and determines meeting access.

On 11 June 2026, it was announced that Reses will depart from his role as Chief of Staff by the end of the summer.

== Personal life ==
Reses is Jewish, and his grandfather escaped the Holocaust. He married Rachel Altman in January 2026. He was profiled in the March 2026 issue of New York magazine.

Political offices
Preceded by Lorraine Voles	Chief of Staff to the Vice President; 2025–2026	Succeeded by Nick Luna
