= Richard Moe =

American lawyer and politician (1936–2025)

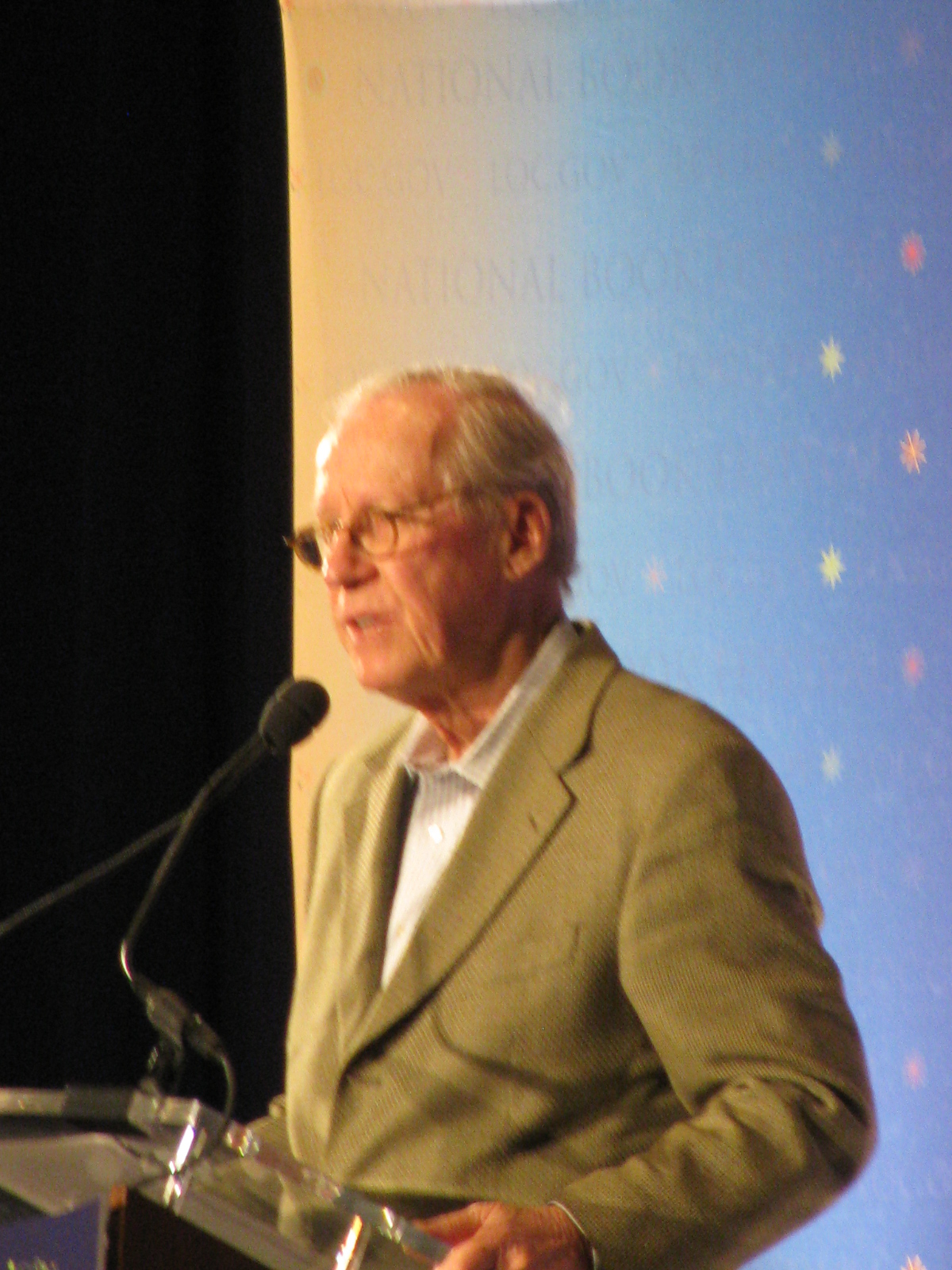
- Moe in 2014

Assistant to the President Chief of Staff to the Vice President
- In office January 20, 1977 – January 20, 1981
- Vice President: Walter Mondale
- Preceded by: Ann C. Whitman
- Succeeded by: Daniel J. Murphy

Chair of the Minnesota Democratic–Farmer–Labor Party
- In office 1969–1972

Personal details
- Born: Richard Palmer Moe; November 27, 1936 Duluth, Minnesota, U.S.
- Died: September 15, 2025 (aged 88) Washington, D.C., U.S.
- Party: Democratic
- Spouse: Julia Neimeyer (m. 1964)
- Children: 2
- Education: Williams College (BA); University of Minnesota (JD)

Richard Palmer Moe (November 27, 1936 – September 15, 2025) was an American attorney and historic preservation advocate who served as chief of staff to the vice president from 1977 to 1981.

== Early life and education ==
Moe was born in Duluth, Minnesota. He earned a Bachelor of Arts degree from Williams College in 1959 and a Juris Doctor from the University of Minnesota Law School in 1966.

== Career ==
Richard Moe served as an administrative assistant to Minneapolis Mayor Arthur Naftalin from 1961 to 1962 and the Minnesota Lieutenant Governor Sandy Keith from 1963 to 1967.

Moe then worked for the Minnesota Democratic–Farmer–Labor Party. He worked as the finance director (1967–1968) and the chairman of the party (1969–1972). He was the second youngest chairman from the party.

He left the party in 1972 to work as an administrative assistant to Senator Walter Mondale. In 1977, Moe served as Chief of Staff to the Vice President of the United States during Walter Mondale's term. He later served on Mondale's presidential campaign team in 1984. Moe also worked on Dick Gephardt's presidential bid (1988) and the Michael Dukakis 1988 presidential campaign.

In 1981, Moe started work at the law firm Davis Polk & Wardwell, where he became a partner of the firm in 1986. Moe then worked as president of the National Trust for Historic Preservation.

=== National Trust for Historic Preservation ===
Moe led the National Trust for Historic Preservation from 1993 to 2009, and succeeded at expanding its budget despite funding reductions from Congress. During his tenure, Moe managed efforts to preserve historical sites, such as Manassas National Battlefield Park. Moe also guided the trust in its major effort to preserve historic structures and sites in New Orleans, Louisiana, following Hurricane Katrina in 2005.

== Awards ==
In 2007, Moe was awarded the Vincent Scully Prize by the National Building Museum in recognition of his contributions to the built environment. That same year, he received the Theodore Roosevelt-Woodrow Wilson Award from the American Historical Association.

== Personal life ==
Moe married Julia Neimeyer on December 26, 1964. They have two children. He lived in Washington, D.C., and died there on September 15, 2025, from complications of Parkinson's disease.

== Works ==
- Last Full Measure. Minnesota Historical Society Press. 1993. ISBN 978-0-87351-739-3.
- Richard Moe, Carter Wilkie, Changing Places: Rebuilding Community in the Age of Sprawl, Henry Holt and Company, 1999, ISBN 9780805061840
- Roosevelt's Second Act: The Election of 1940 and the Politics of War. Oxford University Press, USA. August 12, 2013. pp. 6–. ISBN 978-0-19-998192-2.

Party political offices
Preceded by Warren Spannaus	Democratic-Farmer-Labor Party Chairman; 1969-1972	Succeeded by Hank Fischer
