= Craig L. Fuller =

American political strategist

Craig Fuller
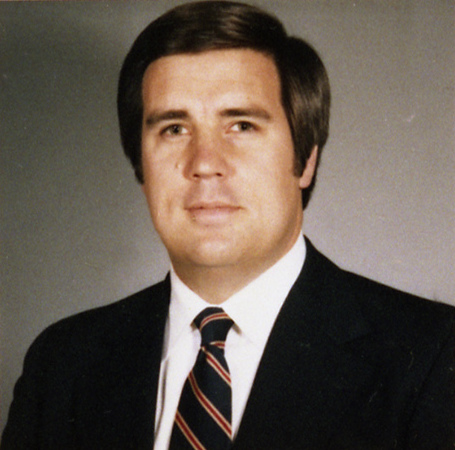
- Fuller in 1983

Assistant to the President Chief of Staff to the Vice President
- In office April 1, 1985 – January 20, 1989
- Vice President: George H. W. Bush
- Preceded by: Daniel J. Murphy
- Succeeded by: Bill Kristol

Assistant to the President White House Cabinet Secretary
- In office September 14, 1981 – January 30, 1985
- President: Ronald Reagan
- Preceded by: Gene Eidenberg
- Succeeded by: Alfred H. Kingon

Personal details
- Born: February 16, 1951 (age 75) Pasadena, California, U.S.
- Party: Republican
- Education: University of California, Los Angeles (BA); Occidental College (MA)

Craig L. Fuller (born February 16, 1951) is an American political strategist who served as White House Cabinet Secretary under President Ronald Reagan from 1981 to 1985 and as Chief of Staff to the Vice President of the United States under George H. W. Bush from 1985 to 1989.

Fuller was co-director of the presidential transition of George H. W. Bush.
