= Roy Neel =

American political activist

White House Deputy Chief of Staff for Policy
- In office July 7, 1993 – December 22, 1993
- President: Bill Clinton
- Preceded by: Mark Gearan
- Succeeded by: Harold M. Ickes

Chief of Staff to the Vice President
- In office January 20, 1993 – July 7, 1993
- Vice President: Al Gore
- Preceded by: Bill Kristol
- Succeeded by: Jack Quinn

Personal details
- Born: 1948 or 1949 (age 77–78)
- Party: Democratic
- Education: Vanderbilt University (BA); Harvard University (MPA)

Roy M. Neel (born 1948/1949) is a Democratic Party operative who was a top assistant to Vice President Al Gore and President Bill Clinton.

== Biography ==
Raised in Smyrna, Tennessee, Neel joined the United States Navy and served a tour of duty in Vietnam as a photojournalist. Early in his career, he worked as a sportswriter for the Nashville Banner. In 1975, he wrote Dynamite! 75 Years of Vanderbilt Basketball. Also in his earlier years, he started an aerial photography business and a political consulting firm and was on the staff of the mayor of Nashville. Neel graduated from Vanderbilt University in 1972 and earned a Master of Public Administration degree from Harvard University in 1983.

In 1977, he joined Gore's congressional staff. He stayed throughout Gore's congressional career, rising to the position of chief of staff in Gore's Senate office. In 1992, he managed Gore's vice presidential campaign; he then participated in the White House transition and became Chief of Staff to the Vice President. In 1993, after 17 years of service to Gore, Neel went on to be President Clinton's Deputy White House Chief of Staff. He was responsible for coordinating policy and communications.

After his White House service, Neel worked for seven years as president and CEO of the United States Telecom Association, representing the regional Bell companies and almost 1,000 local telecom companies. He was a director of public and corporate boards, including the National Railroad Passenger Corporation (Amtrak). He directed Gore's transition planning during the 2000 presidential election and Florida recount. In 2004, he briefly was Vermont Governor Howard Dean's campaign manager and then directed the "Nader Project," an effort at mitigating the effects of Ralph Nader on Democratic electoral success.

He is chief of staff for former vice president Al Gore and his organizational advocacy on climate change. He is also a senior advisor to the Climate Project, which has trained 2,500 individuals around the world to spread the message about the climate crisis.

Neel is also an adjunct professor of political science at Vanderbilt, where he teaches courses in presidential transitions and presidential leadership.

Political offices
| Preceded by Bill Kristol | Chief of Staff to the Vice President; 1993 | Succeeded by Jack Quinn |
