= Alfred H. Kingon =

American diplomat (1931–2025)

Alfred Kingon
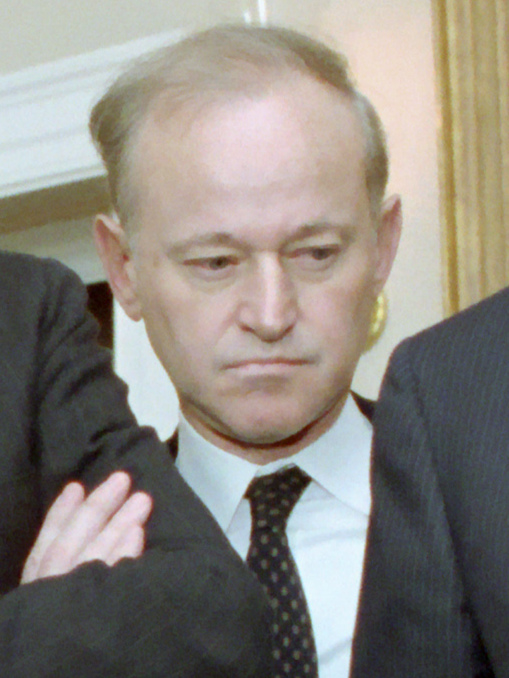

9th United States Ambassador to the European Union
- In office March 27, 1987 – June 23, 1989
- President: Ronald Reagan; George H. W. Bush
- Preceded by: J. William Middendorf
- Succeeded by: Thomas Niles

White House Cabinet Secretary
- In office January 30, 1985 – February 18, 1987
- President: Ronald Reagan
- Preceded by: Craig L. Fuller
- Succeeded by: Nancy Risque

Personal details
- Born: Alfred Hugh Kingon; May 11, 1931 New York City, New York, U.S.
- Died: October 1, 2025 (aged 94) New York City, New York, U.S.
- Party: Republican
- Education: Union College (BA); New York University (MBA)

Alfred Hugh Kingon (May 11, 1931 – October 1, 2025) was an American businessman who served as White House Cabinet Secretary under President Ronald Reagan from 1985 to 1987 and as the United States Ambassador to the European Union from 1987 to 1989.

Kingon died on October 1, 2025, at the age of 94.

Political offices
| Preceded by Craig L. Fuller | White House Cabinet Secretary; 1985–1987 | Succeeded by Nancy Risque |
Diplomatic posts
| Preceded by J. William Middendorf | United States Ambassador to the European Union; 1987–1989 | Succeeded by Thomas Niles |
