= Al Gore 2000 presidential campaign =

American political campaign

Al Gore for President 2000
- Campaign: 2000 Democratic primaries 2000 U.S. presidential election
- Candidate: Al Gore; 45th Vice President of the United States (1993–2001); Joe Lieberman; U.S. Senator from Connecticut (1989–2013)
- Affiliation: Democratic Party
- Status: Announced: June 16, 1999; Presumptive nominee: March 14, 2000; Official nominee: August 17, 2000; Election day: November 7, 2000; Projected defeat: December 12, 2000; Formally conceded: December 13, 2000
- Headquarters: Nashville, Tennessee
- Key people: Donna Brazile (Campaign manager); William M. Daley (Campaign chairman)
- Receipts: (2007-12-31)
- Slogan(s): Leadership for the New Millennium; Prosperity for America's Families; Prosperity and Progress

Website
- www.gorelieberman.com (Archived – October 29, 2000)

The 2000 presidential campaign of Al Gore, the 45th vice president of the United States under President Bill Clinton, began when he announced his candidacy for the presidency of the United States in Carthage, Tennessee, on June 16, 1999. Gore became the Democratic nominee for the 2000 presidential election on August 17, 2000.

On November 7, 2000, projections indicated that Gore's opponent, Texas governor George W. Bush, the Republican candidate, had narrowly won the election. Gore won the national popular vote but lost the Electoral College vote after a legal battle over disputed vote counts in the state of Florida. Bush won the state of Florida in the initial count and also in each subsequent recount at the time. While a NORC study of uncounted ballots released on November 12, 2001, found that with a full statewide hand recount, Gore may have won Florida under revised vote standards (depending on which standard was used, his margin of victory would have varied from 60 to 171 votes), under rules devised by the Florida Supreme Court and accepted by the Gore campaign at the time, Bush would likely have won the recount.

The legal dispute was ultimately resolved by the Supreme Court of the United States in a 5–4 decision. Bush won the election by 537 votes in Florida, and won the electoral college vote of 271 to 266. One elector pledged to Gore did not cast an electoral vote; Gore received 267 pledged electors. The election was one of the most controversial in American history.

Had Gore been elected, he would have been the first sitting vice president to assume the presidency since George H. W. Bush and the fourth from Tennessee, after Andrew Jackson, James K. Polk, and Andrew Johnson. Lieberman would have been the first non-Christian (Jewish) vice president and the highest ranking Jewish American in the U.S. history.

== Announcement and Democratic primaries ==
=== CNN interview ===
Prior to his announcement that he would be running in the 2000 election, Gore participated in a March 9, 1999, interview for CNN's Late Edition with Wolf Blitzer. Gore stated in the interview, "During my service in the United States Congress I took the initiative in creating the internet. I took the initiative in moving forward a whole range of initiatives that have proven to be important to our country's economic growth and environmental protection, improvements in our educational system." Former UCLA professor of information studies, Philip E. Agre and journalist Eric Boehlert both argue that three articles in Wired News led to the creation of the widely spread urban legend that Gore claimed to have "invented the Internet", which followed this interview. This urban legend became "an automatic laugh. Jay Leno, David Letterman, or any other comedic talent can crack a joke about Al Gore 'inventing the Internet,' and the audience is likely to respond with howls of laughter."

In response to the controversy, Vint Cerf and Bob Kahn argued that they didn't think, "as some people have argued, that Gore intended to claim he 'invented' the Internet. Moreover, there is no question in our minds that while serving as Senator, Gore's initiatives had a significant and beneficial effect on the still-evolving Internet."

Gore would later poke fun at the controversy on the Late Show with David Letterman when he read Letterman's Top 10 List, which for this show was called, "Top Ten Rejected Gore - Lieberman Campaign Slogans". Number nine on the list was: "Remember, America, I gave you the Internet, and I can take it away!" A few years later, on June 6, 2005, Gore was awarded the Lifetime Achievement Award "for three decades of contributions to the Internet" at the Webby Awards.

=== Announcement ===
There was talk of a potential run for president by Gore as early as January 1998.

Gore formally announced his candidacy for president on June 16, 1999, in Carthage, Tennessee. He was introduced by his eldest daughter, Karenna Gore, who was pregnant at the time with her first child. The speech was "briefly interrupted" by AIDS protesters claiming Gore was working with the pharmaceutical industry to prevent access to generic medicines for poor nations. Additional speeches were also interrupted by the protesters. Gore responded, "I love this country. I love the First Amendment ... Let me say in response to those who may have chosen an inappropriate way to make their point, that actually the crisis of AIDS in Africa is one that should command the attention of people in the United States and around the world." In making the announcement, Gore also distanced himself from Bill Clinton, whom he stated had lied to him.

=== Primaries ===
Gore faced an early challenge by former New Jersey senator Bill Bradley. Bradley was the only major candidate to oppose Gore and was considered a "fresh face" for the White House. Bradley, in comparing himself with the current administration, argued that "One of the reasons I'm running for president is to restore trust and public service and confidence in our collective will." By the fall of 1999, a number of polls showed Bradley running even with the Vice President in key primary states." Gore responded by switching his campaign headquarters from Washington, D.C., to Nashville, Tennessee, in an effort to further distance himself from Bill Clinton. Gore then challenged Bradley to a series of debates which took the form of "town hall" meetings. Gore went on the offensive during these debates leading to a drop in the polls for Bradley. Gore eventually went on to win every primary and caucus and in March 2000, secured the Democratic nomination.

== Campaign ==
=== Running mate selection ===
- Senator Barbara Boxer of California
- Governor Gray Davis of California
- Senator Dick Durbin of Illinois
- Senator Dianne Feinstein of California
- Senator and Fmr. Governor Bob Graham of Florida
- Governor Jim Hunt of North Carolina
- Secretary of Housing and Urban Development Andrew Cuomo of New York
- Senator Bob Kerrey of Nebraska
- Senator Barbara Mikulski of Maryland
- Senator and former Governor Zell Miller of Georgia
- Fmr. Senate Majority Leader George J. Mitchell of Maine
- Fmr. Senator Sam Nunn of Georgia
- Secretary of Energy Bill Richardson of New Mexico

Short list

- Senator Evan Bayh of Indiana
- Senator Tom Harkin of Iowa
- Senator John Edwards of North Carolina
- House Minority Leader Dick Gephardt of Missouri
- Senator John Kerry of Massachusetts
- Senator Joseph Lieberman of Connecticut
- Governor Jeanne Shaheen of New Hampshire

==== Joe Lieberman and nomination ====
In August 2000, Gore announced that he had selected Senator Joe Lieberman of Connecticut as his vice presidential running mate. Lieberman became "the first person of the Jewish faith to run for the nation's second-highest office" (Barry Goldwater, who ran for president in 1964, was of Jewish origin). Lieberman, who was a more conservative Democrat than Gore, had publicly blasted President Clinton for the Monica Lewinsky affair. Many pundits saw Gore's choice of Lieberman as another way of trying to distance himself from the scandals of the Clinton White House. However, Lieberman voted against Clinton's removal from office in both counts. Lieberman was selected from a group of potential running mates that included Senators John Kerry from Massachusetts and John Edwards from North Carolina, both of whom eventually became the Democratic nominees four years later.

Gore's daughter, Karenna, together with her father's former Harvard roommate Tommy Lee Jones, officially nominated Gore as the Democratic presidential candidate during the 2000 Democratic National Convention in Los Angeles. Gore accepted his party's nomination and spoke about the major themes of his campaign, stating in particular his plan to extend Medicare to pay for prescription drugs, to work for a sensible universal health-care system.

=== Campaign trail and platform ===
Soon after the convention, with running mate Joe Lieberman, Gore hit the campaign trail. He and Bush were deadlocked in the polls.

During his first presidential run in 1988, Gore ran his campaign as "a Southern centrist, [who] opposed federal funding for abortion. He favored a moment of silence for prayer in the schools and voted against banning the interstate sale of handguns." Gore's policies changed substantially during the 2000 campaign, reflecting his eight years as vice president. According to an article by PBS, Gore promised to appoint pro-choice judges with more liberal leanings. Gore appointees are more likely to support gay rights and maintain a separation between religion and government. Gore vowed to maintain a firm distinction between Church and State, and did not focus on religion as a major issue. However, Gore did promote government partnerships with faith-based groups. His running mate, Senator Joe Lieberman, was an observant Jew who often talked about increasing the role of religion in public life. During Gore's eight years as vice president, the Clinton administration appointed 150 gay people to government posts. Al Gore said he wanted to lift the "don't ask, don't tell" policy on LGBT people in the military, which was supported by President Clinton. Gore also promised to work toward expanding gay rights, and supports legislation such as the Hate Crime Prevention Act that would broaden the definition of hate crimes to include crimes committed against gay people.

==== Economic platform ====
Al Gore's platform pledged to "keep our economy strong by building on the careful fiscal policies of the last seven years".

==== National debt and Social Security ====
The platform included a plan to pay off the national debt by 2012. Gore's platform stated: "This fiscally-disciplined approach assures that our children will not be saddled with debt - and the enormous annual interest burden on that debt - and the costs of paying for the Baby Boomers' retirement." Gore's balanced budget plan also devoted the $2.3 trillion social security surplus exclusively to social security and the national debt, thereby extending solvency "through at least 2054".

==== Medicare "lock box" ====
Gore's platform involved creating a "Medicare lock box" designed so that Medicare payroll taxes could only be used to strengthen Medicare and pay down the national debt.

==== Tax cuts ====
Gore proposed a $500 billion package of targeted tax cuts, "to afford quality child care, higher education and lifelong learning, health insurance and long-term care for an aging or disabled relative".

==== Trust funds ====
Gore called for the establishment of "three new trust funds to improve and expand access to affordable health care, dramatically improve education, and clean up [America's] environment". The environmental trust fund would use market-based mechanisms to target the transportation, electric power generation and industrial production sectors of the economy.

==== Investing in technology ====
Gore's plan called for increased investment in biotechnology, information technology, a university research ideas "which are later turned into benefits that we all enjoy such as high-speed wireless networks that can provide telemedicine, distance learning, and electronic commerce to remote rural communities; supercomputers that can dramatically increase our ability to predict tornadoes and hurricanes; and computers that are much easier to use, and can 'understand' human language; new research leading to the design of effective drugs and a speed-up of the time it takes to find important new treatments and cures". These investments were considered "a vital element of preserving and expanding America's prosperity".

==== Investing in communities ====
Gore's platform included measures aimed at "revitalizing distressed communities". This included creating and funding more empowerment zones and enterprise communities (EZs and ECs), tax credits and grants as part of the New Markets Initiative, and $35 million increased funding for the Community Development Financial Institutions (CDFI) Fund.

==== Trade ====
Gore called for opening markets to "spur innovation, speed the growth of new industries, and make [American] businesses more competitive", but also stressed the need to "negotiate worker rights, human rights, and environmental protections", stating: "we should use trade to lift up standards around the world not drag down standards here at home".

==== Defense ====
Gore's economic platform also contained a section entitled "Keep Our Defense Strong and Protect Americans Abroad", in which he stated his intention to "use part of the surplus to make reasonable increases in military spending - targeted to improve benefits and quality of life for servicemen and women, improve force readiness and provide the most modern equipment".

=== Debates ===
Gore and Bush participated in three televised debates. A Gallup debate-reaction survey taken right after the first debate found that viewers felt Gore won the debate by 48 percent to 41. Media analysis focused on the presentation style of each of the candidates. Issues of style and presentation would continue to be a theme throughout the election. Stuart Rothemberg analyzed the debate and declared that Bush appeared to be a "'deer in the headlights' in the first debate. But the governor was relaxed and authentic, and he seemed at ease on the same stage with the sitting vice president ... Gore may have been more aggressive on issues, and he surely was more detailed. But the vice president also looked and sounded about as appealing as a case of the flu. His makeup was terrible, and his comments sounded canned. Gore has always had problems sounding natural, and his first debate performance made him look like a phony politician, not a sincere leader." After three days of such analysis, support for Gore went from a pre-debate lead by 8 points to a tie of 43 percent for both candidates. After the second debate, Gore was criticized as too "reticent" while Bush was "relaxed and self-confident." Finally, critics argued that Gore's performance during the third debate was too aggressive.

== Florida recount and Bush v. Gore ==
Al Gore won the states in blue, George W. Bush won the states in red

On election night, news networks first called Florida for Gore, later retracted the projection, and then called Florida for Bush, before finally retracting that projection as well. Florida Secretary of State Republican Katherine Harris eventually certified the Florida count. This led to the Florida election recount, a move to further examine the Florida results. The Florida recount was stopped a few weeks later by the Supreme Court of the United States. In the ruling, Bush v. Gore, the Florida recount was called unconstitutional and that no constitutionally valid recount could be completed by the December 12 deadline, effectively ending the recounts. This 7–2 vote ruled that the standards the Florida Supreme Court provided for a recount as unconstitutional due to violations of the Equal Protection Clause of the Fourteenth Amendment, and further ruled 5–4 that no constitutionally valid recount could be completed by the December 12 deadline. This case ordered an end to recounting underway in selected Florida counties, effectively giving George W. Bush a 537-vote victory in Florida and consequently Florida's 25 electoral votes and the presidency. The results of the decision led to Gore winning the popular vote by approximately 500,000 votes nationwide, but receiving 266 electoral votes (1 DC Elector abstained) to Bush's 271.

Gore strongly disagreed with the Court's decision, but in a widely praised concession speech, co-written with his chief White House and campaign speechwriter Eli Attie, Gore said, "for the sake of our unity as a people and the strength of our democracy, I offer my concession."

In the introduction to his global warming presentation, Gore later jokingly introduced himself as "the former next President of the United States". Gore became the fourth candidate in American history to win the popular vote but lose the electoral vote after Andrew Jackson, Samuel Tilden, and Grover Cleveland. Hillary Clinton, the First Lady during Gore's vice presidency and later a U.S. Senator and Secretary of State, would subsequently become the fifth such candidate over a decade later, in 2016.

== Transition planning ==
A presidential transition was contingently planned from Clinton to Gore in accordance to occur in the event Gore was elected president. It would have been a "friendly takeover", in which the outgoing president and the incoming president are of the same political party. Unlike Bush, who would have to start from scratch to form an administration, Gore had many top-aides for which he had had input in hiring already in place in Clinton's White House. Since Gore lost the 2000 election to Republican presidential nominee George W. Bush, this transition never went into effect.

Months before the election, transition planning began, with Al Gore appointing Roy Neel to lead the planning effort.

On November 9, Neel announced that all transition planning would be paused by the Gore team. With the result of the election remaining in flux, for some time, Gore would keep this pause on transition planning. Contrarily, Bush proceeded with his transition efforts. Gore's camp criticized this as Bush's team rushing to declare a victory before the election result had even been decided.

In late November, with the inauguration day ever nearing, Gore began resuming work on his transition effort. The Clinton administration would attempt to treat it as though two different presidential transitions were taking place simultaneously. The FBI began conducting background checks for each transition team's potential appointees. Resuming work on his transition, Gore, Lieberman, and Neel gathered a small group of associates and aides, which included Katie McGinty, Secretary of Labor Alexis Herman, Gore's chief of staff Charles Burson, and Gore's national security adviser Leon Fuerth to work on planning activities. They created preliminary lists of nominees for top administration roles. Gore and Lieberman also consulted with individuals such as AFL–CIO president John Sweeney and civil rights leader Jesse Jackson. On November 23, The New York Times reported on Neel making moves related to potential Cabinet picks. On November 24, The New York Times reported that Gore had met at Number One Observatory Circle with Lieberman, Neel, William M. Daley, and Leon Fuerth to discuss transition plans.

Gore's transition effort ended when Bush became president-elect after the Bush v. Gore decision.

== Aftermath ==
=== Theories ===
There were a number of theories connected to Gore's loss. Gore, according to a 2002 NPR article, attributed it to "the economic downturn and stock market slide that began earlier that year." His running mate, Joe Lieberman, criticized Gore for adopting a populist theme, stating that he had objected to Gore's "people vs. the powerful" message, as he believed that it was not the best strategy for a sitting Vice President (Lieberman also stated that he would still endorse Gore if he decided to run for the 2004 election). Other critics attributed Gore's loss in part to Green Party candidate Ralph Nader who garnered 2.7% of the vote, enough of whose votes which they argued might have otherwise gone to Gore to swing the result.

Another theory suggests that Al Gore attempted to run a populist campaign but failed to separate himself from the abuses of the Clinton presidency. The public was not able to forget the Campaign fund raising controversy at the Hsi Lai Temple 1996 United States campaign finance controversy. There is also a theory concerning Al Gore's first campaign interviews on CNN.

However, it has been acknowledged that Gore's decision to distance himself from Clinton—whose Gallup approval ratings were well above 50% throughout the year—was a costly mistake for his campaign.

=== Television appearances ===
A few years later, Gore began to make a number of television appearances in which he displayed a willingness to poke fun at himself, such as in episodes of Futurama and Saturday Night Live. Some argued that this was evidence that he was "presenting a whole new side of himself" to contradict the perception of a persona "often associated with stiffness and caution." There was further speculation that it was indicative of a 2004 presidential run.

=== HBO film ===
The election is the subject of a 2008 made-for-TV movie directed by Jay Roach, produced by, and starring Kevin Spacey called Recount. It premiered on the HBO cable network on May 25, 2008.

== See also ==
- 2000 Democratic Party presidential primaries
- 2000 Democratic Party vice presidential candidate selection
- 2000 Democratic National Convention
- 2000 United States presidential election
- Al Gore 1988 presidential campaign
- George W. Bush 2000 presidential campaign
