= Chief of Staff to the Vice President of the United States =

Chief of staff position within the Office of the Vice President of the United States

Chief of Staff of the Office of the Vice President
- Incumbent; Nick Luna since August 2026
- Office of the Vice President of the United States

The chief of staff to the vice president of the United States is the chief of staff position within the Office of the Vice President, part of the Executive Office of the President of the United States. The chief of staff has been responsible for overseeing the actions of the vice president's staff, managing the vice president's schedule, and deciding who is allowed to meet with the vice president.

== Chiefs of staff to the vice president ==
| Image | Chief | Years | Vice President |
|---|---|---|---|
| | Arthur Sohmer | 1969–1973 | Spiro Agnew |
| | Robert T. Hartmann | 1973–1974 | Gerald Ford |
| | Ann C. Whitman | 1974–1977 | Nelson Rockefeller |
| | Richard Moe | 1977–1981 | Walter Mondale |
| | Daniel J. Murphy | 1981–1985 | George H. W. Bush |
| | Craig L. Fuller | 1985–1989 | George H. W. Bush |
| | Bill Kristol | 1989–1993 | Dan Quayle |
| | Roy Neel | 1993 | Al Gore |
| | Jack Quinn | 1993–1995 | Al Gore |
| | Ron Klain | 1995–1999 | Al Gore |
| | Charles Burson | 1999–2001 | Al Gore |
| | Lewis Libby | 2001–2005 | Dick Cheney |
| | David Addington | 2005–2009 | Dick Cheney |
| | Ron Klain | 2009–2011 | Joe Biden |
| | Bruce Reed | 2011–2013 | Joe Biden |
| | Steve Ricchetti | 2013–2017 | Joe Biden |
| | Josh Pitcock | 2017 | Mike Pence |
| | Nick Ayers | 2017–2019 | Mike Pence |
| | Marc Short | 2019–2021 | Mike Pence |
| | Hartina Flournoy | 2021–2022 | Kamala Harris |
| | Lorraine Voles | 2022–2025 | Kamala Harris |
| | Jacob Reses | 2025–2026 | JD Vance |
| | Nick Luna | 2026–present | JD Vance |

== Popular culture ==
- Joshua Malina portrays Chief of Staff Will Bailey to Vice President Robert Russell on the multiple Emmy Award–winning television drama The West Wing.
- Anna Chlumsky portrays Chief of Staff Amy Brookheimer to Vice President Selina Meyer on the HBO series Veep, a role for which she has been nominated six times for the Primetime Emmy Award for Outstanding Supporting Actress in a Comedy Series.
- Michael Kelly portrays Chief of Staff Doug Stamper on the award-winning Netflix series House of Cards.
- Rosaline Elbay portrays Chief of Staff Nora Koriem to Vice President Grace Penn on the award-winning Netflix series The Diplomat.

== See also ==
- White House Chief of Staff
