= President-elect of the United States =

Winner of the U.S. presidential election before inauguration

- Incumbent; Vacant since January 20, 2025
- Style: The Honorable
- Residence: Blair House (five days before inauguration)
- Term length: In the period between receiving 270 Electoral College votes and noon (Eastern Standard Time) on Inauguration Day
- Inaugural holder: George Washington; January 10 – April 30, 1789
- Formation: No official formation
- Salary: None

The president-elect of the United States is the candidate who has presumptively won the United States presidential election and is awaiting inauguration to become the president. There is no explicit indication in the U.S. Constitution as to when that person actually becomes president-elect, although the Twentieth Amendment uses the term "president-elect", thereby giving the term constitutional basis. It is assumed the Congressional certification of votes cast by the Electoral College of the United States – occurring after the third day of January following the swearing-in of the new Congress, per provisions of the Twelfth Amendment – unambiguously confirms the successful candidate as the official "president-elect" under the U.S. Constitution. As an unofficial term, president-elect has been used by the media since at least the latter half of the 19th century and was in use by politicians since at least the 1790s. Politicians and the media have applied the term to the projected winner, even on election night, and very few who turned out to lose have been referred to as such.

While Election Day is held in early November, formal voting by the members of the Electoral College takes place in mid-December, and those votes are later delivered to a joint session of the Congress to be counted and certified, and the presidential inauguration (at which the oath of office is taken) is then usually held on January 20. The only constitutional provision pertaining directly to the person who has won the presidential election is their availability to take the oath of office. The Presidential Transition Act of 1963 empowers the General Services Administration to determine who the apparent election winner is, and provides for a timely and organized sequence for the federal government's transition planning in cooperation with the president-elect's transition team; it also includes the provision of office space for the "apparent successful candidates". By convention, during the period between the election and the inauguration, the president-elect actively prepares to carry out the duties of the office of president and works with the outgoing (or lame duck) president to ensure a smooth handover of presidential responsibilities. Since 2008, incoming presidents have also used the name Office of the President-Elect to refer to their transition organization, despite a lack of formal description for it.

All elected presidential candidates are referred to as president-elect, with the general exception of incumbent presidents who have won re-election for a second consecutive term as they are already in office and are not waiting to become president. A sitting vice president who is elected president is referred to as president-elect.

== History of the usage of the term ==
The use of the term dates back to at least the 1790s, with letters written by multiple of the Founding Fathers of the United States having used the term in relation to the 1796 United States presidential election. There is evidence from some of these letters that, as is the case today, it may have been acceptable to apply the term to individuals that appeared to have won election, even before the full results were known.

Major news publications began to regularly use the term in the latter half of the 19th century. With the 1933 ratification of the Twentieth Amendment to the United States Constitution, the term was now used in the Constitution of the United States.

== Presidential election law overview ==
Article II, Section 1, Clause 2 of the United States Constitution, along with the Twelfth and Twentieth Amendments directly address and govern the process for electing the nation's president. Presidential elections are further regulated by various federal and state laws.

Under the 1887 Electoral Count Act, the presidential electors, the members of the Electoral College, the body that directly elects the president, must be "appointed, in each state, on the Tuesday next after the first Monday in November, in every fourth year". Thus, all states appoint their electors on the same date, in November, once every four years. However, the manner of appointment of the electors is determined by the law of each state, subject to the restrictions stipulated by the Constitution.

Currently, in every state, an election by the people is the method employed for the choice of the members of the Electoral College. The Constitution, however, does not specify any procedure that states must follow in choosing electors. A state could, for instance, prescribe that they be elected by the state legislature or even chosen by the state's governor. The latter was the norm in early presidential elections prior to the 1820s; no state has done so since the 1860s. Several states have enacted or proposed laws that would give their electoral votes to the winner of the national popular vote regardless of the result of their statewide vote, but these laws will not come into force unless states with a majority of the electoral votes collectively enact such laws, which as of 2018 has yet to occur.

On the Monday after the second Wednesday in December, the electors of each state meet in their respective state capitals (and the electors of the District of Columbia meet in the federal capital), and in those meetings the electors cast their votes for president and vice president of the United States. At the conclusion of their meetings, the electors of each state and of the District of Columbia then execute a "certificate of vote" (in several original copies), declaring the vote count in each meeting. To each certificate of vote, a certificate of ascertainment is annexed. Each certificate of ascertainment is the official document (usually signed by the governor of the state or by the state's secretary of state) that declares the names of the electors, certifying their appointment as members of the Electoral College. Given that in all states the electors are currently chosen by popular vote, each certificate of ascertainment also declares the results of the popular vote that decided the appointment of the electors, although this information is not constitutionally required. The electors in each state and of the District of Columbia then send the certificates of vote, with the enclosed certificates of ascertainment, to the president of the U.S. Senate.

The electoral votes are counted in a joint session of Congress in early January (on January 6 as required by 3 U.S. Code, Chapter 1, or an alternative date set by statute), and if the ballots are accepted without objections, the presidential and vice-presidential candidates winning at least 270 electoral votes—a majority of the total number of electoral votes—are certified as having won the election by the incumbent vice president, in their capacity as president of the Senate. If no presidential candidate reaches the 270-vote threshold, the election for the president is decided by the House of Representatives in a run-off contingent election. Similarly, if no vice-presidential candidate reaches that threshold, the election for the vice president is decided by the Senate.

=== Electoral College role ===
Although neither the Constitution nor any federal law requires electors to vote for the candidate who wins their state's popular vote, some states have enacted laws mandating that they vote for the state vote winner. In 2020, the constitutionality of these laws was upheld by the United States Supreme Court. Historically, there have only been a few instances of "faithless electors" casting their ballots for a candidate to whom they were not pledged, and such instances have never altered the outcome of a presidential election.

=== Congressional reports ===
Two congressional reports found that the president-elect is the eventual winner of the majority of electoral ballots cast in December. The Congressional Research Service (CRS) of the Library of Congress, in its 2004 report "Presidential and Vice Presidential Succession: Overview and Current Legislation," discussed the question of when candidates who have received a majority of electoral votes become president-elect. The report notes that the constitutional status of the president-elect is disputed:

Some commentators doubt whether an official president- and vice president-elect exist prior to the electoral votes being counted and announced by Congress on January 6, maintaining that this is a problematic contingency lacking clear constitutional or statutory direction. Others assert that once a majority of electoral votes has been cast for one ticket, then the recipients of these votes become the president- and vice president-elect, notwithstanding the fact that the electoral votes are not counted and certified until the following January 6.

The CRS report quotes the 1933 U.S. House committee report accompanying the Twentieth Amendment as endorsing the latter view:

It will be noted that the committee uses the term "president-elect" in its generally accepted sense, as meaning the person who has received the majority of electoral votes, or the person who has been chosen by the House of Representatives in the event that the election is thrown into the House. It is immaterial whether or not the votes have been counted, for the person becomes the president-elect as soon as the votes are cast.

=== President-elect succession ===
Scholars have noted that the national committees of the Democratic and Republican parties have adopted rules for selecting replacement candidates in the event of a nominee's death, either before or after the general election. If the apparent winner of the general election dies before the Electoral College votes in December the electors would likely be expected to endorse whatever new nominee their national party selects as a replacement. The rules of both major parties stipulate that if the apparent winner dies under such circumstances and his or her running mate is still able to assume the presidency, then the running mate is to become the president-elect with the electors being directed to vote for the former vice presidential nominee for president. The party's national committee, in consultation with the new president-elect, would then select a replacement to receive the electoral votes for vice president.

If the apparent winner dies between the college's December vote and its counting in Congress in January, the Twelfth Amendment stipulates that all electoral ballots cast shall be counted, presumably even those for a dead candidate. The U.S. House committee reporting on the proposed Twentieth Amendment said the "Congress would have 'no discretion' [and] 'would declare that the deceased candidate had received a majority of the votes.'"

The Constitution did not originally include the term president-elect. The term was introduced through the Twentieth Amendment, ratified in 1933, which contained a provision addressing the unavailability of the president-elect to take the oath of office on Inauguration Day. Section 3 provides that if there is no president-elect on January 20, or the president-elect "fails to qualify", the vice president-elect would become acting president on January 20 until there is a qualified president. The section also provides that if the president-elect dies before noon on January 20, the vice president-elect becomes president-elect. In cases where there is no president-elect or vice president-elect, the amendment also gives the Congress the authority to declare an acting president until such time as there is a president or vice president. At this point the Presidential Succession Act of 1947 would apply, with the office of the Presidency going to the speaker of the House of Representatives, followed by the president pro tempore of the Senate and various Cabinet officers.

Horace Greeley is the only presidential candidate to win pledged electors in the general election and then die before the presidential inauguration; he secured 66 votes in 1872 and died before the Electoral College met. Greeley had already clearly lost the election and most of his votes inconsequentially scattered to other candidates.

The closest instance of there being no qualified person to take the presidential oath of office on Inauguration Day happened in 1877 when the disputed election between Rutherford B. Hayes and Samuel J. Tilden was decided and certified in Hayes' favor just three days before the inauguration (then March 4). It might have been a possibility on several other occasions as well. In January 1853, President-elect Franklin Pierce survived a train accident that killed his 11-year-old son. Four years later, President-elect James Buchanan battled a serious illness contracted at the National Hotel in Washington, D.C., as he planned his inauguration. Additionally, on February 15, 1933, just 23 days after the Twentieth Amendment went into effect, President-elect Franklin D. Roosevelt survived an assassination attempt in Miami, Florida. The amendment's provision moving inauguration day from March 4 to January 20, would not take effect until 1937, but its three provisions about a president-elect went into effect immediately. If the assassination attempt on Roosevelt had been successful then, pursuant to Section 3 of the amendment, Vice President-elect John Nance Garner would have been sworn in as president on Inauguration Day, and the vice presidency would have remained vacant for the entire 4-year term.

== Presidential transitions ==
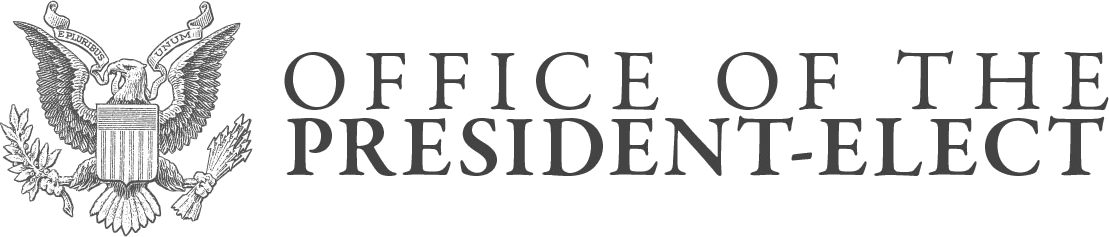
Office of the President-Elect logos first began to be used by the Obama transition team in 2008

2016 logo used by the Trump transition team

2020 logo used by the Biden transition team

2024 logo used by the Trump transition team

Since the widespread adoption of the telegraph in the mid-19th century, the de facto president-elect has been known beyond a reasonable doubt, with only a few exceptions, within a few days (or even hours) of the polls closing on election day. As a result, incoming presidents gained valuable preparation time prior to assuming office.

Recent presidents-elect have assembled transition teams to prepare for a smooth transfer of power following the inauguration. Outgoing presidents have cooperated with the president-elect on important policy matters during the last two months of the president's term to ensure a smooth transition and continuity of operations that have significant national interests. Before the ratification of the Twentieth Amendment in 1933, which moved the start of the presidential term to January, the president-elect did not assume office until March, four months after the popular election.

Under the Presidential Transition Act of 1963 (P.L. 88-277), amended by the Presidential Transitions Effectiveness Act of 1998 (P.L. 100-398), the Presidential Transition Act of 2000 (P.L. 106-293), and the Pre-Election Presidential Transition Act of 2010 (P.L. 111-283), the president-elect is entitled to request and receive certain privileges from the General Services Administration (GSA) as they prepare to assume office.

Section 3 of the Presidential Transition Act of 1963 was enacted to help smooth transitions between incoming and outgoing presidential administrations. To that end, provisions such as office space, telecommunication services, transition staff members are allotted, upon request, to the president-elect, though the Act grants the president-elect no official powers and makes no mention of an "Office of the President-Elect."

In 2008, President-elect Barack Obama gave numerous speeches and press conferences in front of a placard emblazoned with "Office of the President Elect" and used the same term on his website. President-elect Donald Trump did likewise on January 11, 2017.

The Presidential Transition Act of 1963 further authorizes the Administrator of the General Services Administration to issue a "letter of ascertainment" even before the December vote of the Electoral College; this letter identifies the apparent winners of the November general election; this enables the president-elect, vice president-elect, and transition teams for the purposes of receiving federal transition funding, office space and communications services prior to the beginning of the new administration on January 20. There are no firm rules on how the GSA determines the president-elect. Typically, the GSA chief might make the decision after reliable news organizations have declared the winner or following a concession by the loser.

Article II, Section 1, Clause 8 of the Constitution provides that "Before he enter on the Execution of his Office" the president shall swear or affirm to "faithfully execute the Office of President of the United States" and "preserve, protect and defend the Constitution of the United States." The Twentieth Amendment provides that noon on January 20 marks both the end of a four-year presidential term and the beginning of the next four-year presidential term. It is a "constitutional mystery" about who (if anyone) holds the presidency during the brief period on Inauguration Day between noon and the swearing-in of a new president (or the renewed swearing-in of a re-elected president) approximately five minutes later. One view is that "a President-elect does not assume the status and powers of the President until he or she takes the oath"; under this view, "a person must reach before he or she can assume and exercise the powers of President." A second, opposite view is that the taking of the oath is a "ceremonial reminder of both the President's duty to execute the law and the status of the Constitution as supreme law" and is not a prerequisite to a person "exercis[ing] the powers of the Chief Executive"; the view can be partially based on the fact that the oath is not mentioned in the eligibility requirements for the presidency set forth elsewhere in Article II. A third, intermediate view (the "primed presidency" view) is that "a President-elect automatically becomes President upon the start of his new term, but is unable to 'enter on the Execution of his Office' until he recites the oath"; in other words, the president "must complete the oath before she can constitutionally tap the power of the presidency."

The president-elect and vice president-elect receive mandatory protection from the United States Secret Service. Since the 1968 assassination of Robert F. Kennedy, major-party candidates also receive such protection during the election campaign.

== List of presidents-elect ==
President-elect (Note: Column counts number of presidents-elect. Grover Cleveland and Donald Trump are counted twice because they were elected to two non-consecutive terms. John Tyler, Millard Fillmore, Andrew Johnson, Chester A. Arthur and Gerald Ford are not counted because they entered office intra-term and never elected to the presidency. Theodore Roosevelt, Calvin Coolidge, Harry S. Truman and Lyndon B. Johnson, who also entered office intra-term, are not counted because they were already incumbent presidents when elected to a full term.)		Party	Following	Through
1	George Washington	Nonpartisan	Election of 1788–89 (Note: Also after a delay in the certification of the electoral votes by Congress.)	George Washington's first inauguration
2	John Adams	Federalist	Election of 1796	John Adams's inauguration
3	Thomas Jefferson	Democratic-Republican	Election of 1800 (Note: Also after a contingent election in the House of Representatives.)	Thomas Jefferson's first inauguration
4	James Madison	Democratic-Republican	Election of 1808	James Madison's first inauguration
5	James Monroe	Democratic-Republican	Election of 1816	James Monroe's first inauguration
6	John Quincy Adams	Democratic-Republican	Election of 1824	John Quincy Adams's inauguration
7	Andrew Jackson	Democratic	Election of 1828	Andrew Jackson's first inauguration
8	Martin Van Buren	Democratic	Election of 1836	Martin Van Buren's inauguration
9	William Henry Harrison	Whig	Election of 1840	William Henry Harrison's inauguration
10	James K. Polk	Democratic	Election of 1844	James K. Polk's inauguration
11	Zachary Taylor	Whig	Election of 1848	Zachary Taylor's inauguration
12	Franklin Pierce	Democratic	Election of 1852	Franklin Pierce's inauguration
13	James Buchanan	Democratic	Election of 1856	James Buchanan's inauguration
14	Abraham Lincoln	Republican	Election of 1860	Abraham Lincoln's first inauguration
15	Ulysses S. Grant	Republican	Election of 1868	Ulysses S. Grant's first inauguration
16	Rutherford B. Hayes	Republican	Election of 1876 (Note: Also after a dispute over 20 electoral votes from four states was resolved by a special Electoral Commission established by Congress.)	Rutherford B. Hayes's inauguration
17	James A. Garfield	Republican	Election of 1880	James A. Garfield's inauguration
18; 1st	Grover Cleveland	Democratic	Election of 1884	Grover Cleveland's first inauguration
19	Benjamin Harrison	Republican	Election of 1888	Benjamin Harrison's inauguration
20; 2nd	Grover Cleveland	Democratic	Election of 1892	Grover Cleveland's second inauguration
21	William McKinley	Republican	Election of 1896	William McKinley's first inauguration
22	William Howard Taft	Republican	Election of 1908	William Howard Taft's inauguration
23	Woodrow Wilson	Democratic	Election of 1912	Woodrow Wilson's first inauguration
24	Warren G. Harding	Republican	Election of 1920	Warren G. Harding's inauguration
25	Herbert Hoover	Republican	Election of 1928	Herbert Hoover's inauguration
26	Franklin D. Roosevelt	Democratic	Election of 1932	Franklin D. Roosevelt's first inauguration
27	Dwight D. Eisenhower	Republican	Election of 1952	Dwight D. Eisenhower's first inauguration
28	John F. Kennedy	Democratic	Election of 1960	John F. Kennedy's inauguration
29	Richard Nixon	Republican	Election of 1968	Richard Nixon's first inauguration
30	Jimmy Carter	Democratic	Election of 1976	Jimmy Carter's inauguration
31	Ronald Reagan	Republican	Election of 1980	Ronald Reagan's first inauguration
32	George H. W. Bush	Republican	Election of 1988	George H. W. Bush's inauguration
33	Bill Clinton	Democratic	Election of 1992	Bill Clinton's first inauguration
34	George W. Bush	Republican	Election of 2000 (Note: Also after a dispute over Florida's 25 electoral votes was resolved by the Supreme Court in Bush v. Gore, which halted the Florida vote recount that was under way.)	George W. Bush's first inauguration
35	Barack Obama	Democratic	Election of 2008	Barack Obama's first inauguration
36; 1st	Donald Trump	Republican	Election of 2016	Donald Trump's first inauguration
37	Joe Biden	Democratic	Election of 2020	Joe Biden's inauguration
38; 2nd	Donald Trump	Republican	Election of 2024	Donald Trump's second inauguration

== See also ==
- Vice President-elect of the United States
- Prime minister-designate (analogous term)
