= Al Gore 1988 presidential campaign =

American political campaign

- Campaign: 1988 U.S. presidential election
- Candidate: Al Gore; U.S. Senator from Tennessee (1985–1993); House Representative from Tennessee (1977–1985)
- Affiliation: Democratic Party
- Headquarters: Carthage, Tennessee

The 1988 presidential campaign of Al Gore, U.S. Senator of Tennessee and former House Representative began on April 11, 1987. He campaigned for President of the United States as a Democratic candidate in the 1988 presidential election, against Democratic candidates Joe Biden, Dick Gephardt, Paul Simon, Jesse Jackson, and Michael Dukakis (who eventually won the Democratic nomination).

Age 39 at the time, Gore was described as the first serious young presidential candidate since John F. Kennedy in 1960. He was characterized as a political centrist aligned with many other Southern Democrats. Despite eventual defeat, Gore, who came in a third place, was one of the front-runners that year. Gore, at that time, represented the Southern Democrats and some of the Conservative Democrats in 1980s.

== Announcement ==
On April 11, 1987, Senator Gore of Tennessee announced his candidacy. He stated that he believed he could offer "clearer goals" than the other candidates.

Gore was further described by The New York Times as:

solidly built, dark and indisputably handsome. He has a powerful sweet tooth but keeps his weight under control by running several miles a day at dawn. His stump speaking is erratic, one night spirited and evocative and the next flat and routine. He is an indifferent platform joke-teller but can be a raconteur and mimic of some skill in the privacy of his chartered campaign plane. National analysts make Senator Gore a long-shot for the Presidential nomination, but many believe he could provide a natural complement for any of the other candidates: a young, attractive, moderate Vice Presidential nominee from the South. He currently denies any interest, but he carefully does not reject the idea out of hand.

At the time of the announcement, Senator Gore was 39 years old, making him the "youngest serious Presidential candidate since John F. Kennedy."

== Campaign ==
=== Political views ===
According to CNN, Gore ran his campaign as "a Southern centrist, [who] opposed federal funding for abortion. He favored a moment of silence for prayer in the schools and voted against banning the interstate sale of handguns." He positioned himself as a centrist alternative to fellow leading candidates Jesse Jackson and eventual primary winner Michael Dukakis. Gore stated that he made numerous speeches concerning global warming and the greenhouse effect on the campaign trail that received minimal media attention.

=== Campaign developments ===
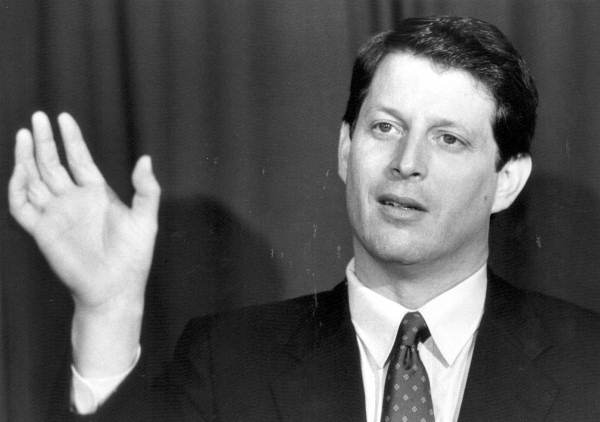
Al Gore at a press conference in Tallahassee, Florida during the 1988 campaign.

CNN notes that "in 1988, for the first time, 12 Southern states would hold their primaries on the same day, Super Tuesday." As the only other Southern candidate, Gore chose to criticize Jesse Jackson often. Gore began to criticize Jackson for his Middle East policies. In particular, "Albert Gore Jr. assailed Mr. Jackson's foreign policy views and said he was 'dismayed' by Mr. Jackson's 'embrace of Arafat and Castro'." Jackson responded by stating that, "The issue is not whether the Israelis and Palestinians are moral equivalents. Both of them are human beings and both are trapped in the cycle of death and pain. And they are trapped in the cycle of mutual annihilation. I wanted to offer leadership that will move from mutual annihilation to coexistence to break the cycle of death."

Gore was heavily criticized for his attacks against both Jackson and Dukakis. Jackson also retracted some of his previous statements. It was Gore who first mentioned the Massachusetts furlough program Dukakis had supported as Governor by asking him questions in a debate right before the 1988 New York primary, about "weekend passes for convicted criminals"; this later developed into the Willie Horton pro-George H. W. Bush attack ad. However, unlike commonly believed, Gore did not mention Horton by name.

During the Democratic debate, Gore argued that his foreign policy platform was different from his rivals, but they disagreed. "'I reject Gore’s efforts to try to pin labels,' Representative Richard A. Gephardt of Missouri told reporters after the event."

Jackson defeated Gore in the South Carolina Primary, winning "more than half the total vote, three times that of his closest rival here, Senator Albert Gore Jr. of Tennessee." Gore next placed great hope on Super Tuesday where they split the Southern vote: Jackson winning Alabama, Georgia, Louisiana, Mississippi and Virginia; Gore winning Arkansas, North Carolina, Kentucky, Nevada, Tennessee, and Oklahoma.

== Dropping out ==
The Gore campaign came to a close after Dukakis won the New York primary with 51% of the vote, followed by Jackson at 37%, and Gore only received 10%. The New York Times argued that he lost support due to his attacks against Jackson, Dukakis, and others, as well as for his endorsement by Koch.

Gore was eventually able to mend fences with Jesse Jackson, who supported the Clinton–Gore ticket in 1992 and 1996, and who also campaigned for the Gore–Lieberman ticket during the 2000 presidential election. According to some, Gore's policies had changed in 2000, reflecting his eight years as Vice President.

== Statewide contests won ==
1988 Democratic primary results by state. States won by Gore are colored in green.

South: Tennessee, Kentucky, North Carolina, Arkansas, Oklahoma

Outside the South: Nevada, Wyoming

== Popular vote position ==
- Dukakis – 9,898,750 (42.51%)
- Jackson – 6,788,991 (29.15%)
- Gore – 3,185,806 (13.68%)
- Gephardt – 1,399,041 (6.01%)
- Simon – 1,082,960 (4.65%)

== Endorsements ==
47th Texas Governor, Republican Rick Perry, who at the time was a Democrat in the Texas State House, campaigned for Gore during the primaries.

Gore was later endorsed by New York Mayor Ed Koch, who made statements in favor of Israel and against Jackson. These statements further cast Gore in a negative light. The endorsement led voters away from Gore who only received 10% of the vote in the New York Primary.

=== Governors ===
- Governor of Louisiana Buddy Roemer
- Former Governor of North Carolina Jim Hunt

=== United States senators ===
- Senator Howell Heflin of Alabama
- Senator Terry Sanford of North Carolina
- Senator Sam Nunn of Georgia
- Senator J. Bennett Johnston of Louisiana
- Senator David Boren of Oklahoma
- Former Senator Ralph Yarborough of Texas

=== Lieutenant governors ===
- Lieutenant Governor of Alabama Jim Folsom, Jr.
- Former Lieutenant Governor of Alabama Bill Baxley

=== State lower house speakers ===
- Georgia House of Representatives Speaker Tom Murphy
- Alabama House of Representatives Speaker James S. Clark

=== Others ===
- Mayor of New York Ed Koch
- Texas State Representative Rick Perry
- Alabama State Senator Ryan DeGraffenried

== See also ==
- Al Gore 2000 presidential campaign
