= United States presidential transition =

Transfer of presidential power after elections

In the United States, a presidential transition is the process during which the president-elect of the United States prepares to take over the administration of the federal government of the United States from the incumbent president. Though planning for transition by a non-incumbent candidate can start at any time before a presidential election and in the days following, the transition formally starts when the General Services Administration (GSA) declares an “apparent winner” of the election, thereby releasing the funds appropriated by Congress for the transition, and continues until inauguration day, when the president-elect takes the oath of office, at which point the powers, immunities, and responsibilities of the presidency are legally transferred to the new president.

The 20th Amendment to the Constitution, adopted in 1933, moved the beginning and ending of the terms of the president and vice president from March 4 to January 20, thereby also shortening the transition period. After the election, an outgoing president is commonly referred to as a lame-duck president. A transition can also arise intra-term if a president dies, resigns or is removed from office, though the period may be very short.

The Presidential Transition Act of 1963 provides the current mechanisms to facilitate an orderly and peaceful transition of power. Under existing federal law and custom, the major-party presidential candidates receive classified national security briefings once their nomination is formalized by their party. They are also entitled to presidential transition services and facilities provided by the General Services Administration, including office space, equipment and the payment of certain related expenses. Just after the presidential election, a revised edition of the Plum Book is published, which lists over 9,000 federal civil service leadership and support political appointment positions which an incoming administration needs to review, and fill or confirm. Though the formal transition commences when it is clear that a non-incumbent candidate has won the election, counting of votes continues until all votes are counted, after which officials from each state certify the state's final tally before the presidential electors are formally appointed and the Electoral College meets in mid-December to cast their votes for the president and vice president.

Transition normally involves a transition team to carry out some pre-election planning by the non-incumbent candidates, and involves consideration of key personnel from the outgoing and incoming presidents' staffs, requires resources, and includes a host of activities, such as vetting candidates for positions in the new administration, helping to familiarize the incoming administration with the operations of the executive branch, and developing a comprehensive policy platform.

== Background ==
The use of the term "presidential transition" to describe the period between a president's election and assumption of office does not appear to have come to general usage until as late as 1948. The term "interregnum" has also been applied to this period of time. For much of U.S. history, they were far less elaborate operations and were carried out without very much advance planning or even cooperation from the outgoing president. Legally, a president-elect is not required to come to the capital until the inauguration and need not have substantial policy or procedural discussions with the outgoing administration.

It was not until the 1950s that much public attention was brought to the idea of presidential transitions. President Harry S. Truman set the stage for modern presidential transitions by offering to provide intelligence briefings to Republican Party candidate Dwight D. Eisenhower and then by inviting President-elect Eisenhower to the White House after his victory in the 1952 election. Eisenhower, smarting from an insult aimed at him by Truman during the campaign ("The general doesn't know any more about politics than a pig knows about Sunday."), declined to receive a direct briefing from Truman before the election. Truman also ordered federal agencies to assist with the transition. Eight years later, John F. Kennedy engaged in extensive transition planning on domestic and foreign policy issues, but did not meet with Eisenhower until December 6, 1960, four weeks after the election.

== Presidential transition acts ==
The Presidential Transition Act of 1963 (Pub. L. 88–277) established the mechanisms to facilitate an orderly and peaceful transition of power, and has been amended numerous times: by the Presidential Transitions Effectiveness Act of 1998 (Pub. L. 100–398), the Presidential Transition Act of 2000 (Pub. L. 106–293 (text) (PDF)), the Pre-Election Presidential Transition Act of 2010 (Pub. L. 111–283 (text) (PDF)), the Presidential Transitions Improvements Act of 2015 (Pub. L. 114–136 (text) (PDF)), the Presidential Transition Act of 2019, and the Electoral Count Reform and Presidential Transition Improvement Act of 2022.

The Pre-Election Presidential Transition Act of 2010 requires the General Services Administration to provide potential presidential transition teams with office space, facilities, funding for transition staff, and access to government services. For example, spending on Mitt Romney's transition team in 2012 was going to be $8.9 million, all funds appropriated by the federal government. It requires the GSA to inform major-party presidential candidates along with what the GSA might consider third-party “principal contenders” in a presidential general election of their right to receive certain services, facilities, and supplies within three business days of nomination by their party. It was passed in part due to national security concerns following the 9/11 attacks.

The Presidential Transition Act of 2019 requires the incumbent president to establish "transition councils" by June of an election year to facilitate a possible handover of power.

== Process ==
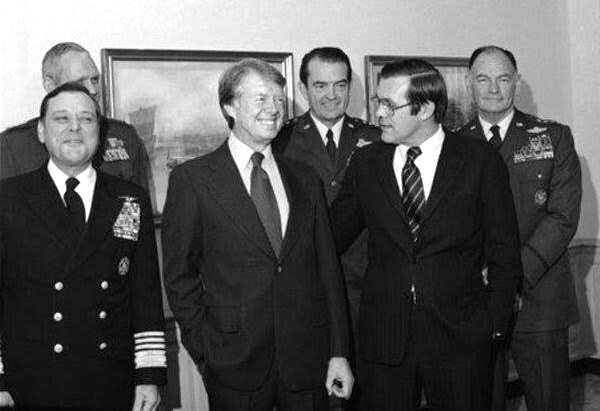
President-elect Jimmy Carter with U.S. secretary of defense Donald Rumsfeld and Chairman of the Joint Chiefs of Staff General George S. Brown and the other members of the Joint Chiefs of Staff during a visit to The Pentagon during presidential transition from Ford administration to Carter administration, December 17, 1976

The transition process begins as leading presidential contenders forming a transition team to start making preliminary plans for building an administration and assuming the presidency should they be elected. This can take place at any time of the candidate's choosing. In 2008, the presidential campaign of Democratic Party nominee Barack Obama began informally planning for a possible presidential transition several months before Election Day. Obama's transition team, called the "Obama-Biden Transition Project", analysed prior transition efforts, the workings of federal government agencies, and what priority positions needed to be filled by the incoming administration first. In April 2012, before Mitt Romney became the Republican Party nominee, the Romney presidential campaign began planning for a potential transition. Romney's transition team made extensive plans for the transfer of power, called the "Romney Readiness Project", which also included a legislative agenda for the first 200 days of a Romney administration.

During the 2016 presidential election cycle, Donald Trump began assembling his transition team in May, after he became the presumptive Republican nominee. His fall campaign opponent, Hillary Clinton, lagged behind in this regard, not forming a team until August, which was after she became the Democratic nominee. Key activities in this pre-election phase include: setting goals for the transition; assembling and organizing the key transition team staff; allocating responsibilities among the team and allocating resources and personnel for each core work stream; developing an overall management work plan to guide the team through the entire transition process; and establishing relationships with Congress, the outgoing administration, General Services Administration, the Office of Government Ethics, the FBI and the Office of Personnel Management to encourage information sharing and to begin the security clearance process for select personnel.

The GSA administrator officially determines the "apparent winner" of a presidential election. If it is not the incumbent president, the winner can access federal agencies and transition funds. To free government funds, the GSA Administrator is required to issue an "ascertainment" letter declaring a non-incumbent candidate the "apparent winner" of an election. The declaration marks the official start of the transition, without which the winning candidate's transition team is not entitled to government funding, secure office space, equipment and access to agencies. The right to the ownership and confidentiality of emails and phone records produced by the transition team is, however, not secure as against the GSA and the government.

There are no firm rules on how the GSA determines the president-elect. Typically, the GSA chief might make the decision after reliable news organizations have declared the winner or following a concession by the loser. The GSA administrator's declaration releases about $9.9 million in transition funds for salary, support, and computer systems; allows transition officials to establish government email addresses and receive federal office space; and allows the transition team to start work with the Office of Government Ethics on required financial disclosure and conflict-of-interest forms for incoming nominees.

The actual transition phase begins immediately following the presidential election (barring any electoral disputes) when a sitting president is not re-elected or is concluding a second term. In the case of the Obama-Trump transition, on the day after the election, November 9, 2016, outgoing president Barack Obama made a statement from the Rose Garden of the White House in which he announced that he had spoken the previous evening with (apparent election winner) Donald Trump and formally invited him to the White House for discussions to ensure "that there is a successful transition between our presidencies". Obama said he had instructed his staff to "follow the example" of the administration of George W. Bush in 2008, who he said could "not have been more professional or more gracious in making sure we had a smooth transition". This phase of the process lasts between 72 and 78 days, ending on the inauguration day. During this time, the transition team must handle the influx of campaign staff and additional personnel into daily operations and prepare to take over the functions of government. Key activities in this phase include staffing the office of the president-elect; deploying agency review teams; building out the president-elect's management and policy agendas and schedule; and identifying the key talent necessary to execute the new president's priorities.

== Appointments ==
It is the practice for Cabinet secretaries and high-level political appointees to tender their resignation with effect on the Inauguration Day (January 20) of a new president. The deputy secretaries are also expected to tender their resignation, but are commonly requested to stay on in an acting capacity until the confirmation by the Senate of the new secretary.

== Noteworthy transitions ==
Presidential transitions have existed in one form or another since 1797, when retiring president George Washington passed the presidency to John Adams, winner of the 1796 United States presidential election. Despite most going smoothly, many have been bumpy and a few verged on catastrophic.

=== Buchanan–Lincoln ===
During the 1860–61 transition from James Buchanan to Abraham Lincoln (November 6, 1860, to March 4, 1861), seven states seceded in February. Buchanan held the opinion that states did not have the right to secede, but that it was also illegal for the federal government to go to war to stop them. Buchanan peacefully transferred power to Lincoln on March 4, 1861. The American Civil War began on April 12, 1861, just a month after Lincoln took office.

=== Grant–Hayes ===
In the 1876 election to succeed Ulysses S. Grant, there were disputes regarding 20 electoral votes in four states—enough to guarantee a majority for either Rutherford B. Hayes or Samuel J. Tilden—along with multiple allegations of electoral fraud. This made it unclear who would take the president's office on inauguration day. This constitutional crisis was resolved only two days before the scheduled inauguration through the Compromise of 1877 under which federal troops were withdrawn from the South, and the Reconstruction era was brought to an end.

=== Hoover–Roosevelt ===
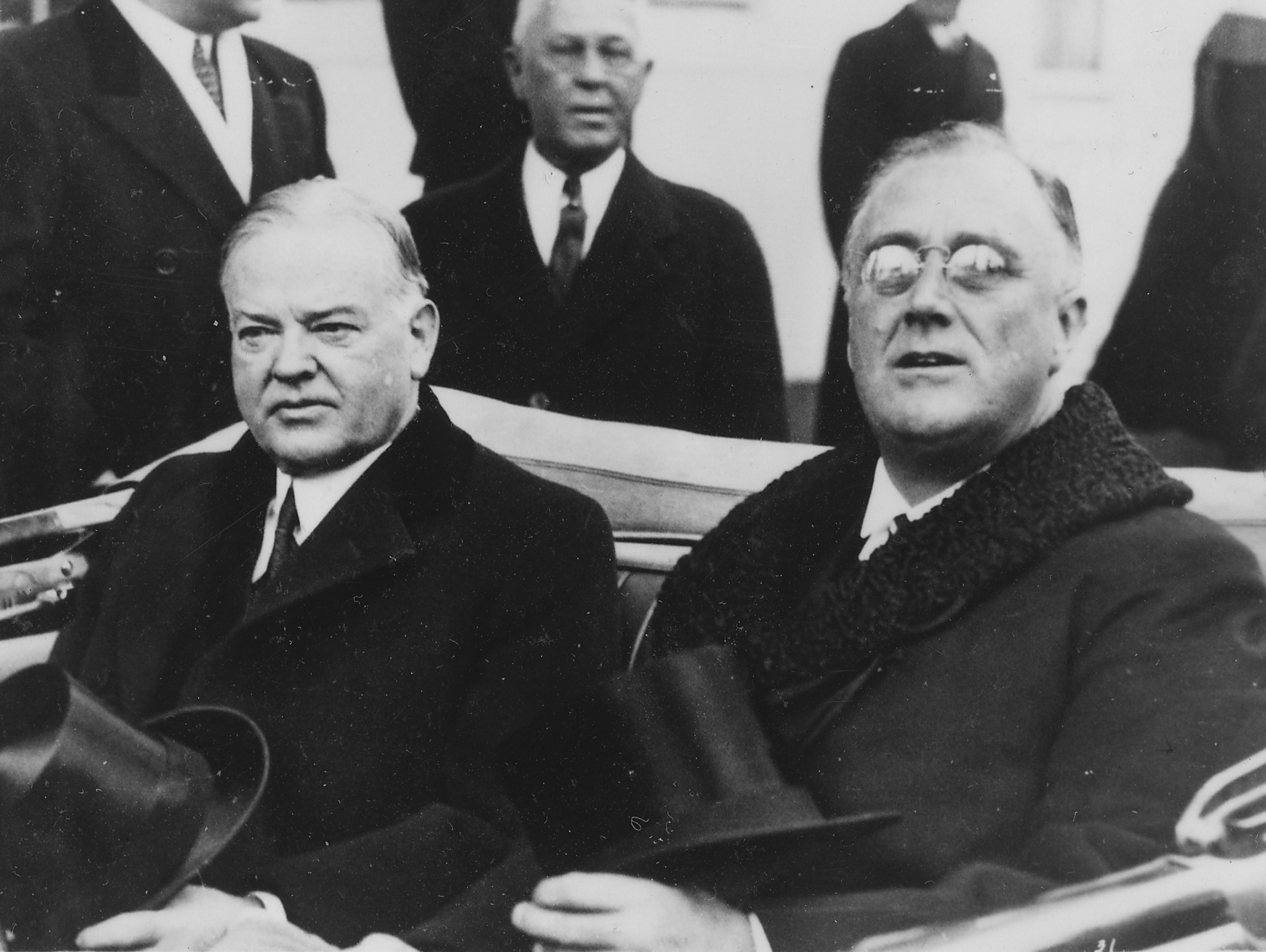
President Hoover and President–elect Roosevelt riding together to the United States Capitol prior to the March 4, 1933 presidential inauguration

The 1932–33 transition (November 8, 1932, to March 4, 1933) from Herbert Hoover to Franklin D. Roosevelt was during the Great Depression.

After the election, Roosevelt refused Hoover's requests for a meeting to come up with a joint program to stop the crisis and calm investors, claiming it would limit his options, and as this "would guarantee that Roosevelt took the oath of office amid such an atmosphere of crisis that Hoover had become the most hated man in America". During this period, the U.S. economy suffered after thousands of banks failed. The relationship between Hoover and Roosevelt was one of the most strained between presidents: while Hoover had little good to say about his successor, there was little he could do. Roosevelt, however, supposedly could—and did—engage in various spiteful official acts aimed at his predecessor, ranging from dropping him from the White House birthday greetings message list to having Hoover's name struck from the Hoover Dam along the Colorado River border, which would officially be known only as Boulder Dam until 1947.

=== Clinton–Bush ===
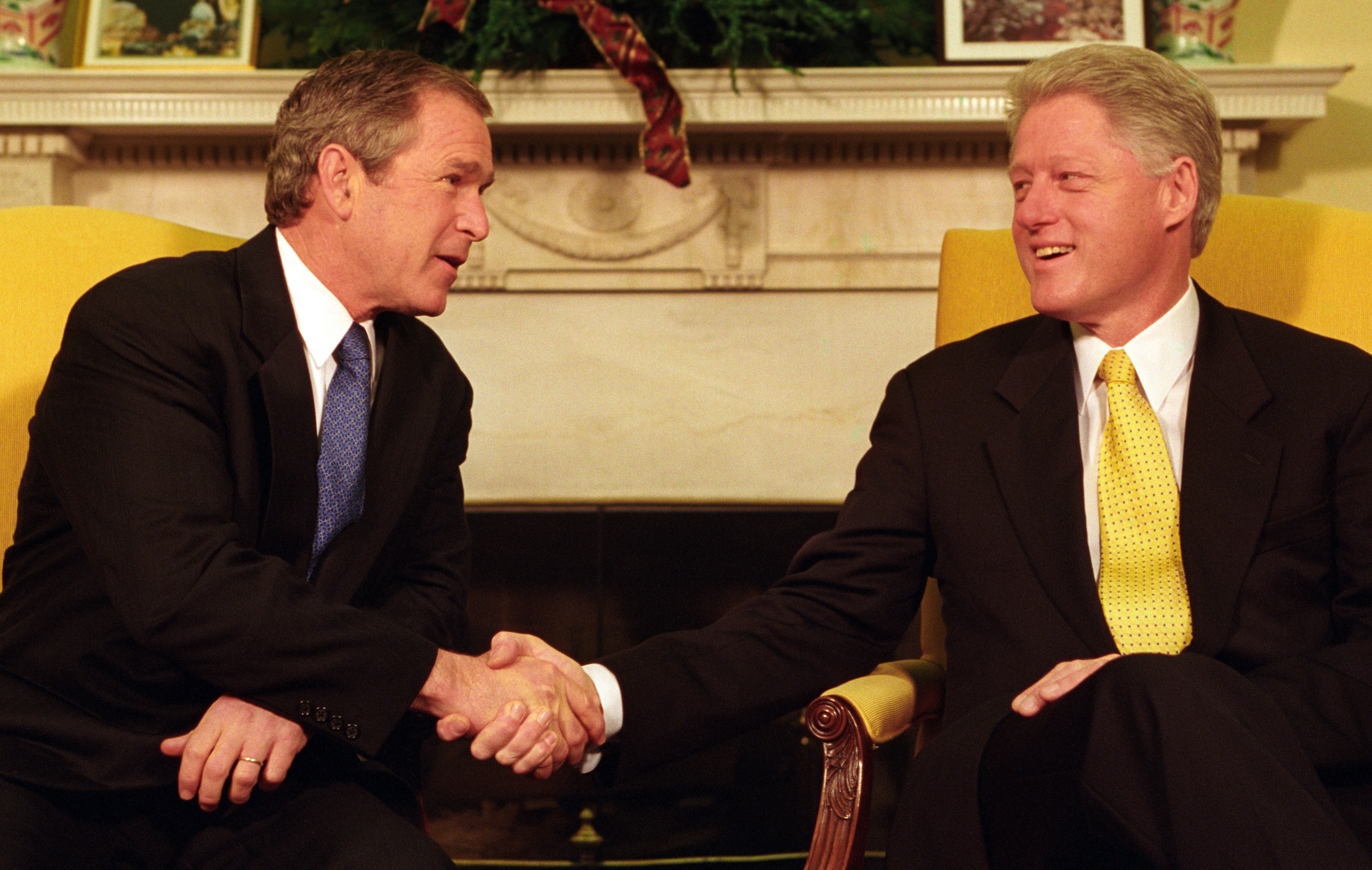
President Bill Clinton (right) and President-elect George W. Bush (left) meet in the Oval Office of the White House as part of the presidential transition.

The 2000–01 transition from Bill Clinton to George W. Bush was shortened by several weeks due to the Florida recount crisis that ended after the Supreme Court handed down its ruling in Bush v. Gore which made Bush the president-elect.

Due to the recount effort and litigation between Bush and his presidential opponent Al Gore leaving the election undecided until December 12, 2000, Bush's official transition was the shortest in United States history, at just 39 days.

=== Bush–Obama ===
The 2008–09 transition from Bush to Barack Obama was considered seamless, with Bush granting Obama's request to ask Congress to release $350 billion of bank bailout funds. At the start of his inaugural speech, Obama praised Bush "for his service to our nation, as well as the generosity and co-operation he has shown throughout this transition". The White House website was redesigned and “cut over” at exactly 12:01 pm, January 20, 2009. This was described by some as a "new inaugural tradition spawned by the Internet-age". Additionally, the information system was provided to the Obama administration without a single electronic record from the previous administration. Not only were emails and photos removed from the environment at the 12:01pm threshold, data elements like phone numbers of individual offices and upcoming meetings for the senior staff were also removed.

Nonetheless, by April 2012, the Bush administration had transferred electronic records for the presidential components within the Executive Office of the President to the National Archives and Records Administration. Included in these records was more than 80 terabytes of data, more than 200 million emails and 4 million photos.

=== Obama–Trump ===
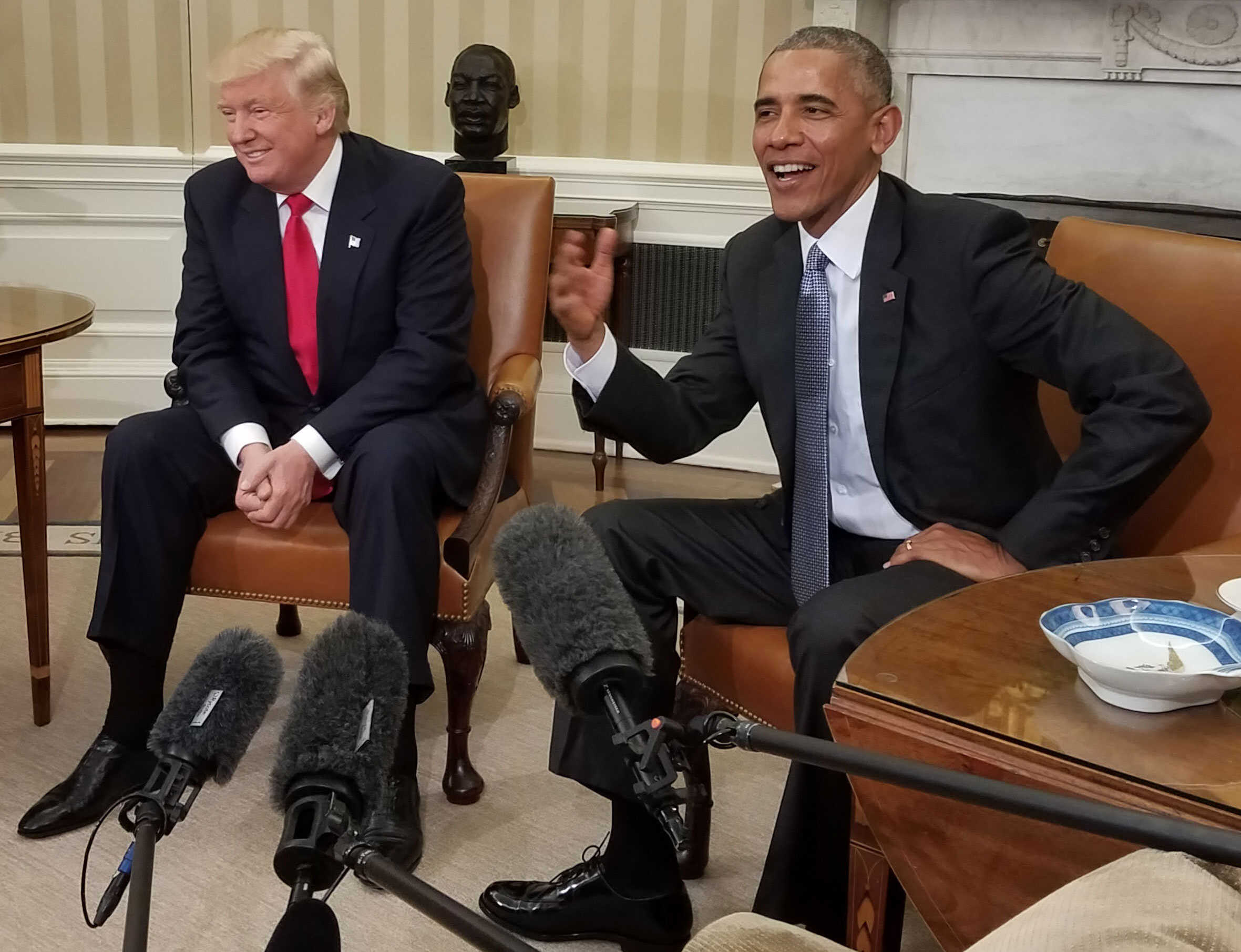
President Barack Obama (right) and President-elect Donald Trump (left) meet in the Oval Office of the White House as part of the presidential transition.

On the evening of November 8, 2016, the day of the presidential election, outgoing president Barack Obama spoke with presumptive winner Donald Trump and formally invited him to the White House for November 10, for discussions to ensure "that there is a successful transition between our presidencies".

Early on November 9, media outlets projected Trump would secure enough votes in the Electoral College to win the presidential election, and Democratic Party nominee Hillary Clinton conceded the election to him later that day. Also on November 9, GSA administrator Denise Turner Roth issued the "ascertainment letter” to officially designate Trump president-elect, and the transition team was provided office space and were also eligible for government funding for staff. Also on November 9, Trump and Vice President-elect Mike Pence were offered the full President's Daily Brief, with the first briefing taking place on November 15. The Trump transition website was launched on November 9.

The Trump transition team was led by Mike Pence and had six vice-chairs: former transition head Chris Christie, Ben Carson, Newt Gingrich, Michael Flynn, Rudy Giuliani and Jeff Sessions.

=== Trump–Biden ===
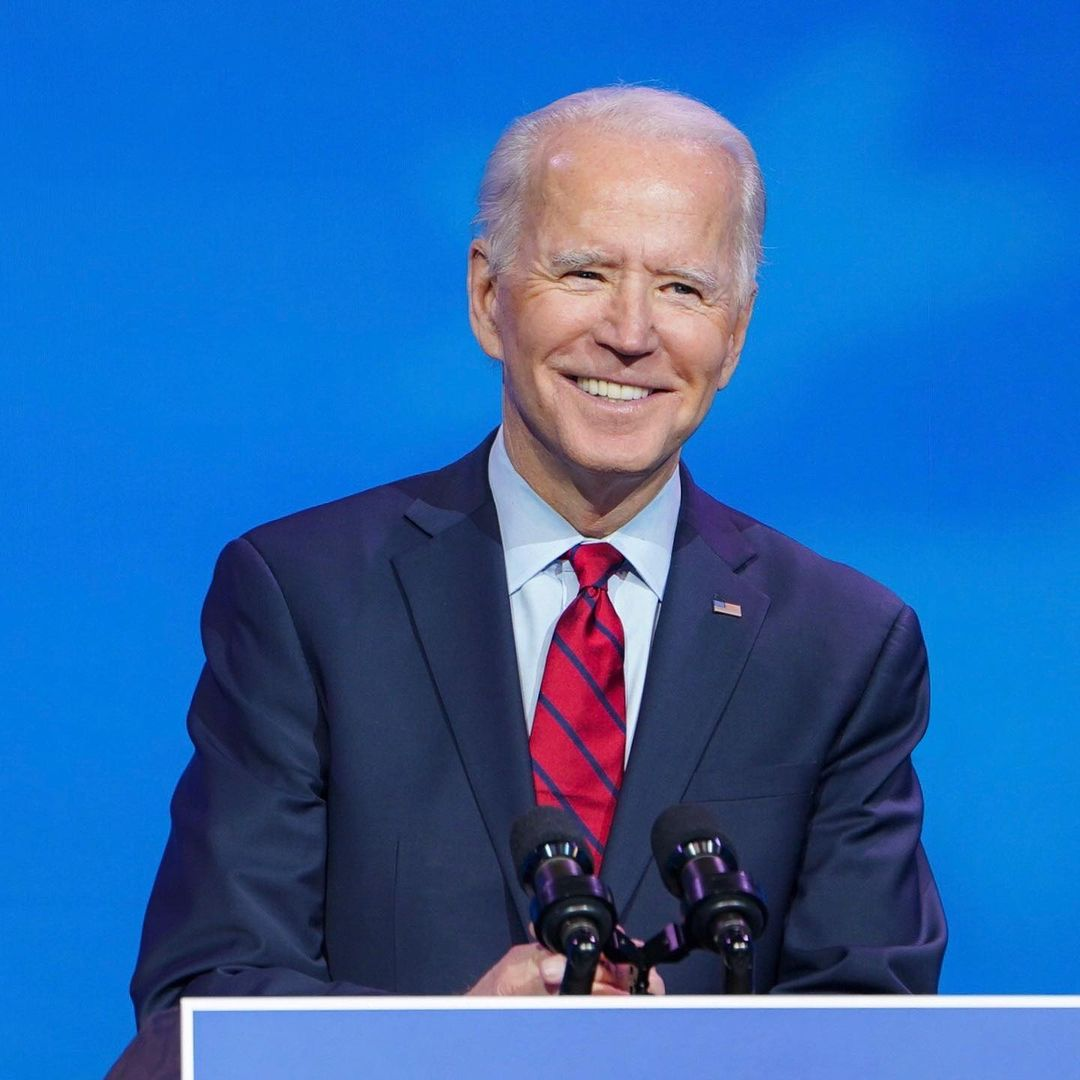
President-elect Joe Biden during the presidential transition

Incumbent president Donald Trump prematurely claimed victory in the 2020 presidential election on Election Day, November 3 and demanded all further vote counting cease. The president also alleged widespread fraud, corruption and other misconduct, and commenced multiple lawsuits in multiple states seeking a halt to counting, rejection of votes, preventing certification of results, besides other remedies. Trump falsely claimed that 2.7 million votes were "deleted" by the digital voting system used in some states, and falsely said votes were switched from him to Joe Biden. Officials called the 2020 election the most secure in history and officials from all fifty states refuted claims of fraud.

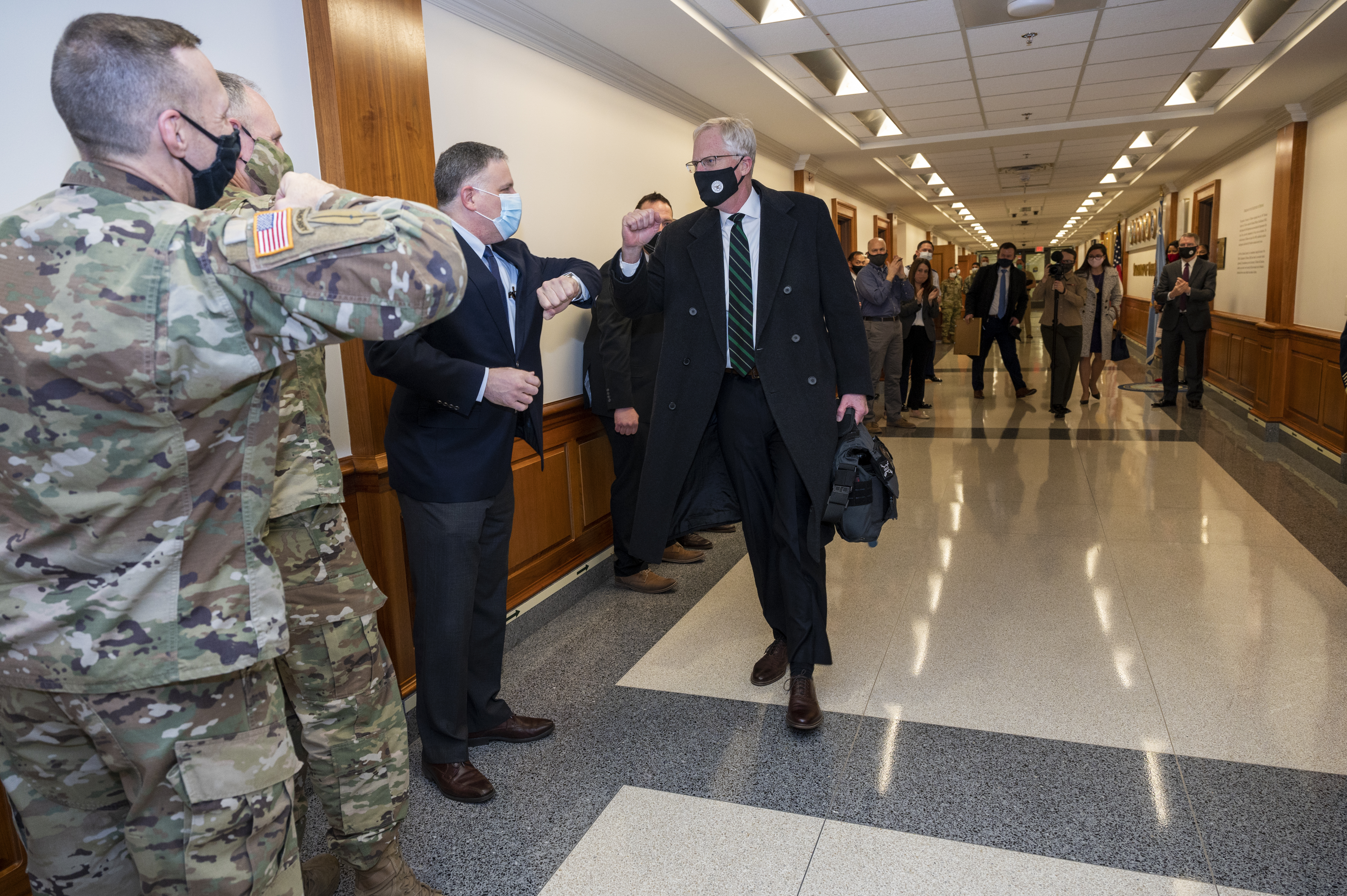
Acting Defense Secretary Chris Miller greets staff as he departs the Pentagon during the administration transition, January 20, 2021.

Democratic presidential candidate Joe Biden became generally acknowledged as the president-elect on November 7, 2020. The GSA administrator, Emily Murphy, a Trump appointee, initially refused to issue the "ascertainment" letter declaring Biden the "apparent winner", on the basis that the election result was disputed. The declaration would mark the official start of the transition: withholding it denied the Biden transition team full funds, secure office space, and access to agencies. (Following the 2016 presidential election, the acting GSA administrator issued the "ascertainment" letter the next day, on November 9, 2016.) Biden had also been denied daily classified national security briefings. Further, the State Department denied access to communications from foreign leaders, leaving the Biden team to communicate through other unofficial channels. According to CBS News, "In past transitions, the State Department has facilitated the logistics of the calls and provided translation services, possible talking points, and even taken notes".

On November 23, Murphy issued the letter of ascertainment naming Biden as the "apparent winner", making funds available for him towards the transition, although Trump had still not conceded. After pro-Trump protesters stormed the U.S. Capitol on January 6, 2021, Trump offered a statement that "My focus now turns to a smooth, orderly and seamless transition of power", although he continued to reiterate his false claims of widespread fraud and irregularities. President Trump did not attend Biden's inauguration, which made him the first president not to attend the inauguration of his elected successor since Andrew Johnson was absent from the first inauguration of Ulysses S. Grant in 1869. Vice President Mike Pence attended Biden's inauguration.

=== Biden–Trump ===
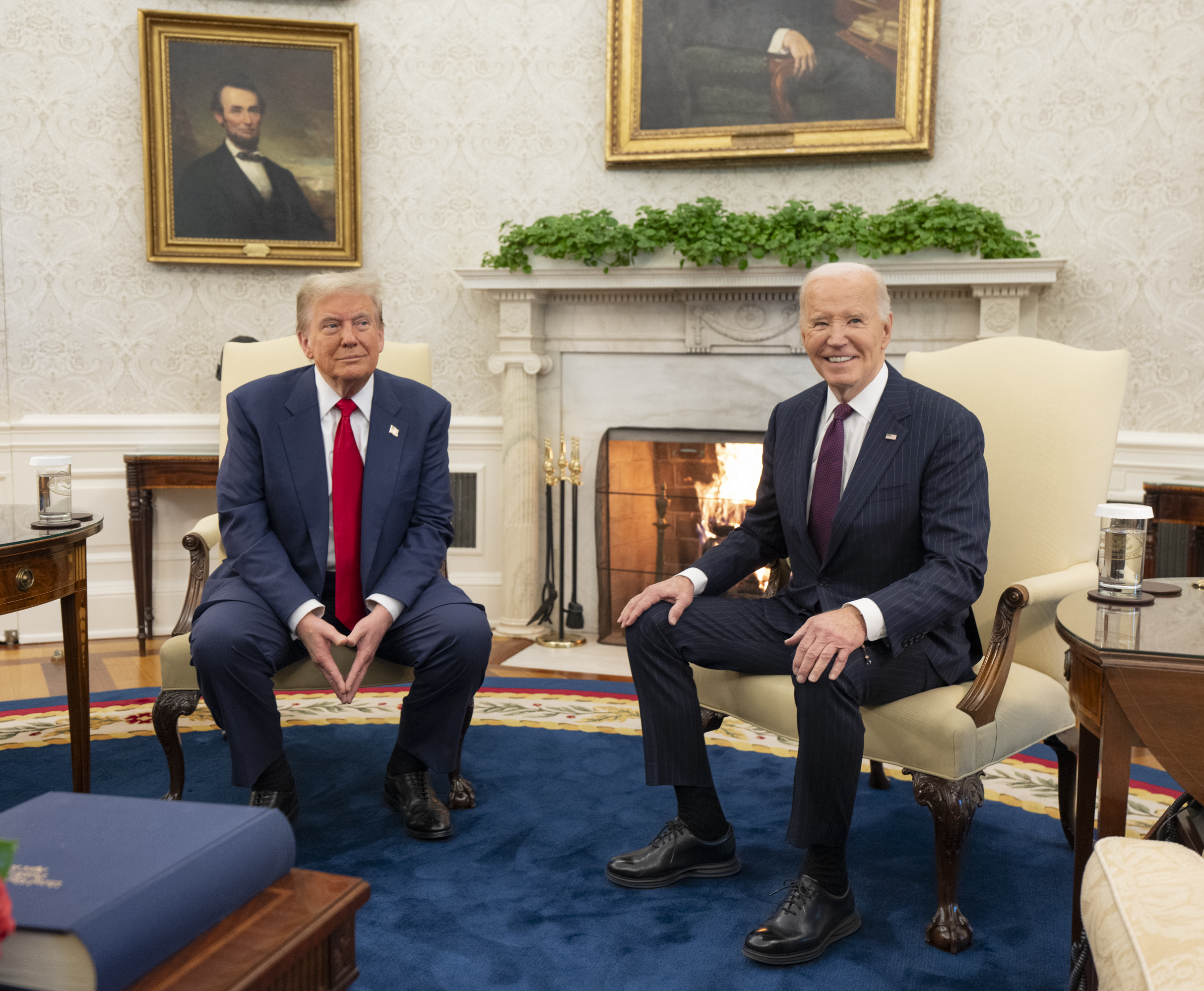
President Joe Biden (right) and President-elect Donald Trump (left) meet in the Oval Office of the White House as part of the presidential transition.

In the early morning of November 6, 2024, major news outlets projected that Trump would win the 2024 presidential election. Vice President Kamala Harris committed to a peaceful transition of power during her concession speech that evening. The following day, President Biden announced he was taking steps to coordinate the transition.

Trump and Biden met in the Oval Office on November 13 for about two hours, with both calling for a "smooth transition" and Trump expressing his appreciation for Biden's efforts. This resumed the hallmark of peaceful transitions that had been disrupted in the previous presidential transition.

== List of presidential transitions ==
Unaffiliated Federalist Democratic-Republican Democratic Whig Republican National Union
Outgoing president (Party)	Incoming president (Party)	Article	Transition began following	Transition concluded with
George Washington (Unaffiliated)	John Adams (Federalist)		Election of 1796	Inauguration of John Adams, March 4, 1797
John Adams (Federalist)	Thomas Jefferson (Democratic-Republican)	Transition	Contingent election of 1801; February 17, 1801	First inauguration of Thomas Jefferson, March 4, 1801
Thomas Jefferson (Democratic-Republican)	James Madison (Democratic-Republican)		Election of 1808	First inauguration of James Madison, March 4, 1809
James Madison (Democratic-Republican)	James Monroe (Democratic-Republican)		Election of 1816	First inauguration of James Monroe, March 4, 1817
James Monroe (Democratic-Republican)	John Quincy Adams (Democratic-Republican)		Contingent election of 1825; February 9, 1825	Inauguration of John Quincy Adams, March 4, 1825
John Quincy Adams (Democratic-Republican)	Andrew Jackson (Democratic)		Election of 1828	First inauguration of Andrew Jackson, March 4, 1829
Andrew Jackson (Democratic)	Martin Van Buren (Democratic)		Election of 1836	Inauguration of Martin Van Buren, March 4, 1837
Martin Van Buren (Democratic)	William Henry Harrison (Whig)		Election of 1840	Inauguration of William Henry Harrison, March 4, 1841
John Tyler (Unaffiliated)	James K. Polk (Democratic)		Election of 1844	Inauguration of James K. Polk, March 4, 1845
James K. Polk (Democratic)	Zachary Taylor (Whig)	Transition	Election of 1848	Inauguration of Zachary Taylor, March 5, 1849
Millard Fillmore (Whig)	Franklin Pierce (Democratic)		Election of 1852	Inauguration of Franklin Pierce, March 4, 1853
Franklin Pierce (Democratic)	James Buchanan (Democratic)		Election of 1856	Inauguration of James Buchanan, March 4, 1857
James Buchanan (Democratic)	Abraham Lincoln (Republican)	Transition	Election of 1860	First inauguration of Abraham Lincoln, March 4, 1861
Andrew Johnson (Democratic)	Ulysses S. Grant (Republican)		Election of 1868	First inauguration of Ulysses S. Grant, March 4, 1869
Ulysses S. Grant (Republican)	Rutherford B. Hayes (Republican)		Electoral Commission ruling March 2, 1877	Inauguration of Rutherford B. Hayes , March 4, 1877
Rutherford B. Hayes (Republican)	James A. Garfield (Republican)		Election of 1880	Inauguration of James A. Garfield, March 4, 1881
Chester A. Arthur (Republican)	Grover Cleveland (Democratic)		Election of 1884	First inauguration of Grover Cleveland, March 4, 1885
Grover Cleveland (Democratic)	Benjamin Harrison (Republican)		Election of 1888	Inauguration of Benjamin Harrison, March 4, 1889
Benjamin Harrison (Republican)	Grover Cleveland (Democratic)		Election of 1892	Second inauguration of Grover Cleveland, March 4, 1893
Grover Cleveland (Democratic)	William McKinley (Republican)		Election of 1896	First inauguration of William McKinley, March 4, 1897
Theodore Roosevelt (Republican)	William Howard Taft (Republican)	Transition	Election of 1908	Inauguration of William Howard Taft, March 4, 1909
William Howard Taft (Republican)	Woodrow Wilson (Democratic)	Transition	Election of 1912	First inauguration of Woodrow Wilson, March 4, 1913
Woodrow Wilson (Democratic)	Warren G. Harding (Republican)	Transition	Election of 1920	Inauguration of Warren G. Harding, March 4, 1921
Calvin Coolidge (Republican)	Herbert Hoover (Republican)	Transition	Election of 1928	Inauguration of Herbert Hoover, March 4, 1929
Herbert Hoover (Republican)	Franklin D. Roosevelt (Democratic)	Transition	Election of 1932	First inauguration of Franklin D. Roosevelt, March 4, 1933
Harry S. Truman (Democratic)	Dwight D. Eisenhower (Republican)	Transition	Election of 1952	First inauguration of Dwight D. Eisenhower, January 20, 1953
Dwight D. Eisenhower (Republican)	John F. Kennedy (Democratic)	Transition	Election of 1960	Inauguration of John F. Kennedy, January 20, 1961
Lyndon B. Johnson (Democratic)	Richard Nixon (Republican)	Transition	Election of 1968	First inauguration of Richard Nixon, January 20, 1969
Gerald Ford (Republican)	Jimmy Carter (Democratic)	Transition	Election of 1976	Inauguration of Jimmy Carter, January 20, 1977
Jimmy Carter (Democratic)	Ronald Reagan (Republican)	Transition	Election of 1980	First inauguration of Ronald Reagan, January 20, 1981
Ronald Reagan (Republican)	George H. W. Bush (Republican)	Transition	Election of 1988	Inauguration of George H. W. Bush, January 20, 1989
George H. W. Bush (Republican)	Bill Clinton (Democratic)	Transition	Election of 1992	First inauguration of Bill Clinton, January 20, 1993
Bill Clinton (Democratic)	George W. Bush (Republican)	Transition	U.S. Supreme Court decision in Bush v. Gore; December 12, 2000	First inauguration of George W. Bush, January 20, 2001
George W. Bush (Republican)	Barack Obama (Democratic)	Transition	Election of 2008	First inauguration of Barack Obama, January 20, 2009
Barack Obama (Democratic)	Donald Trump (Republican)	Transition	Election of 2016	First inauguration of Donald Trump, January 20, 2017
Donald Trump (Republican)	Joe Biden (Democratic)	Transition	Election of 2020	Inauguration of Joe Biden, January 20, 2021
Joe Biden (Democratic)	Donald Trump (Republican)	Transition	Election of 2024	Second inauguration of Donald Trump, January 20, 2025

== See also ==
- Contingent election, procedure used in U.S. presidential elections in cases where no candidate wins an absolute majority of votes in the Electoral College
- Midnight regulations, rules created by an outgoing administration before it leaves office
- Former Presidents Act
- Political transition team
