= Presidential transition of Woodrow Wilson =

Transfer of presidential power from William Howard Taft to Woodrow Wilson

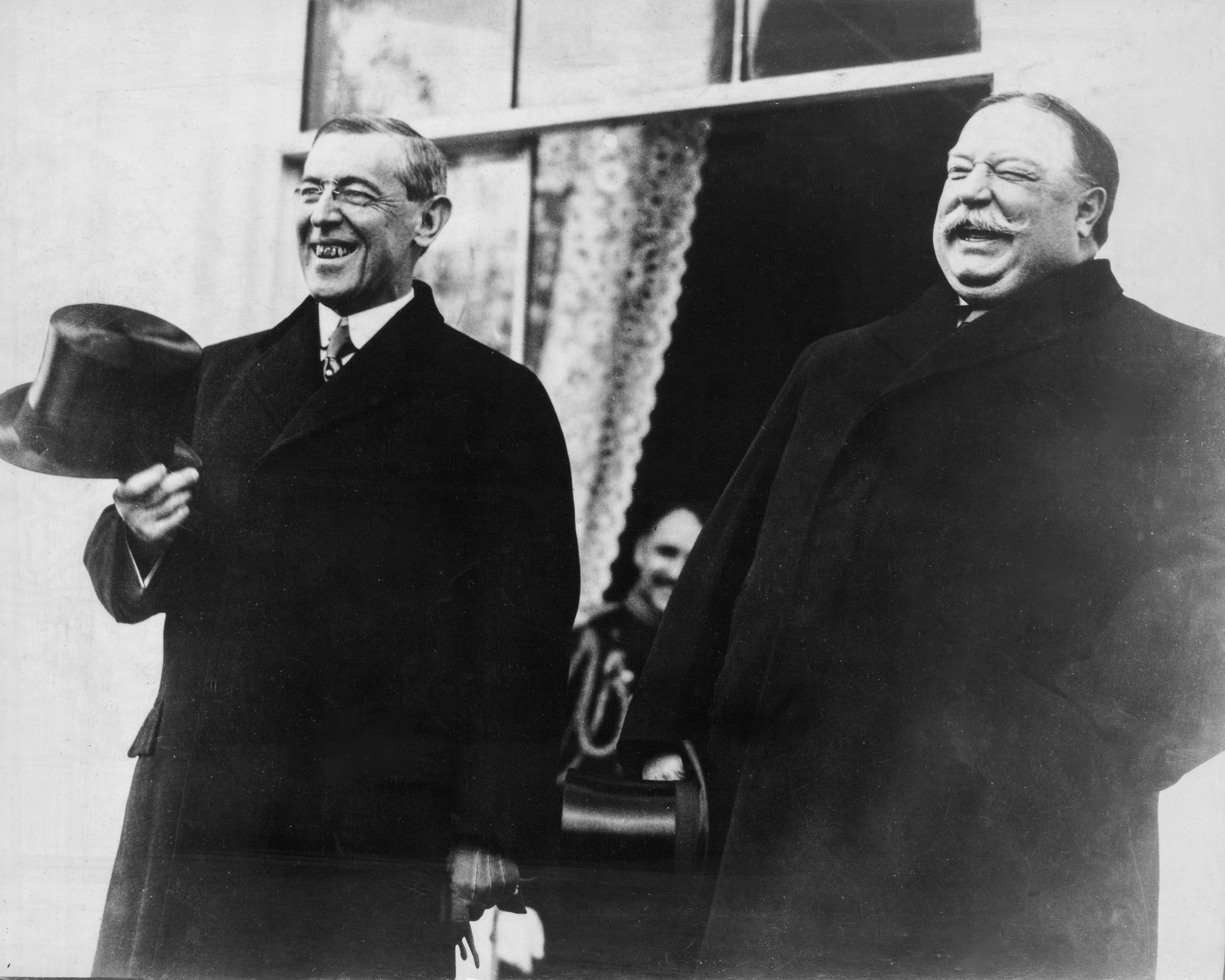
- President-elect Wilson (left) and President Taft (right) at the White House before Wilson's inauguration
- Election date: November 12, 1912
- Inauguration date: March 4, 1913
- President-elect: Woodrow Wilson (Democrat)
- Vice president-elect: Thomas R. Marshall (Democrat)
- Outgoing president: William Howard Taft (Republican)
- Outgoing vice president: None (office vacant since the death of James S. Sherman)

The presidential transition of Woodrow Wilson began when he won the United States 1912 United States presidential election, becoming the president-elect, and ended when Wilson was inaugurated at noon EST on March 4, 1913.

At the time that Wilson's occurred, the term "presidential transition" had yet to be widely applied to the period between an individual's election as president of the United States and their assumption of the office.

== Activities of President-elect Wilson ==
Shortly after winning the presidential election, Wilson boarded a ship to begin a month-long vacation in Bermuda. At the time, it was common for president-elects to take weeks-long vacations following their election, as presidential transitions were longer than they have been more recently. The Twentieth Amendment to the United States Constitution would shorten transitions. Transitions were far less substantial in scale compared to the large operations of more recent presidential transitions. Wilson arrived in Bermuda on November 18, and remained there until December 13.

Wilson did not resign his office of governor of New Jersey until several days prior to assuming the presidency, and spent much of his transition conducting official gubernatorial business in Trenton, New Jersey.

From mid-December through February, Wilson spent much of his time carrying out on his gubernatorial responsibilities and focusing on selecting appointees for his presidential administration's Cabinet. He also worked on developing policies for his presidential administration.

From December 27 through 29, Wilson stayed in Staunton, Virginia, his birthplace, in order to attend a celebration of his birthday there.

=== Selecting appointees ===
==== Cabinet members ====
Wilson's Cabinet selection process was heavily concealed from both the public, and even most of the Democratic Party's politicians and operatives. Wilson did not announce any of his Cabinet choices prior to his inauguration. This was not unusual for United States presidential transitions of the day, as, in preceding presidential transitions too, Cabinet selections would either go unannounced before the inauguration, or, otherwise, would only be announced shortly before the inauguration.

Soon after the election, Wilson commented that he had been the recipient of many telegrams soliciting advice about his Cabinet.

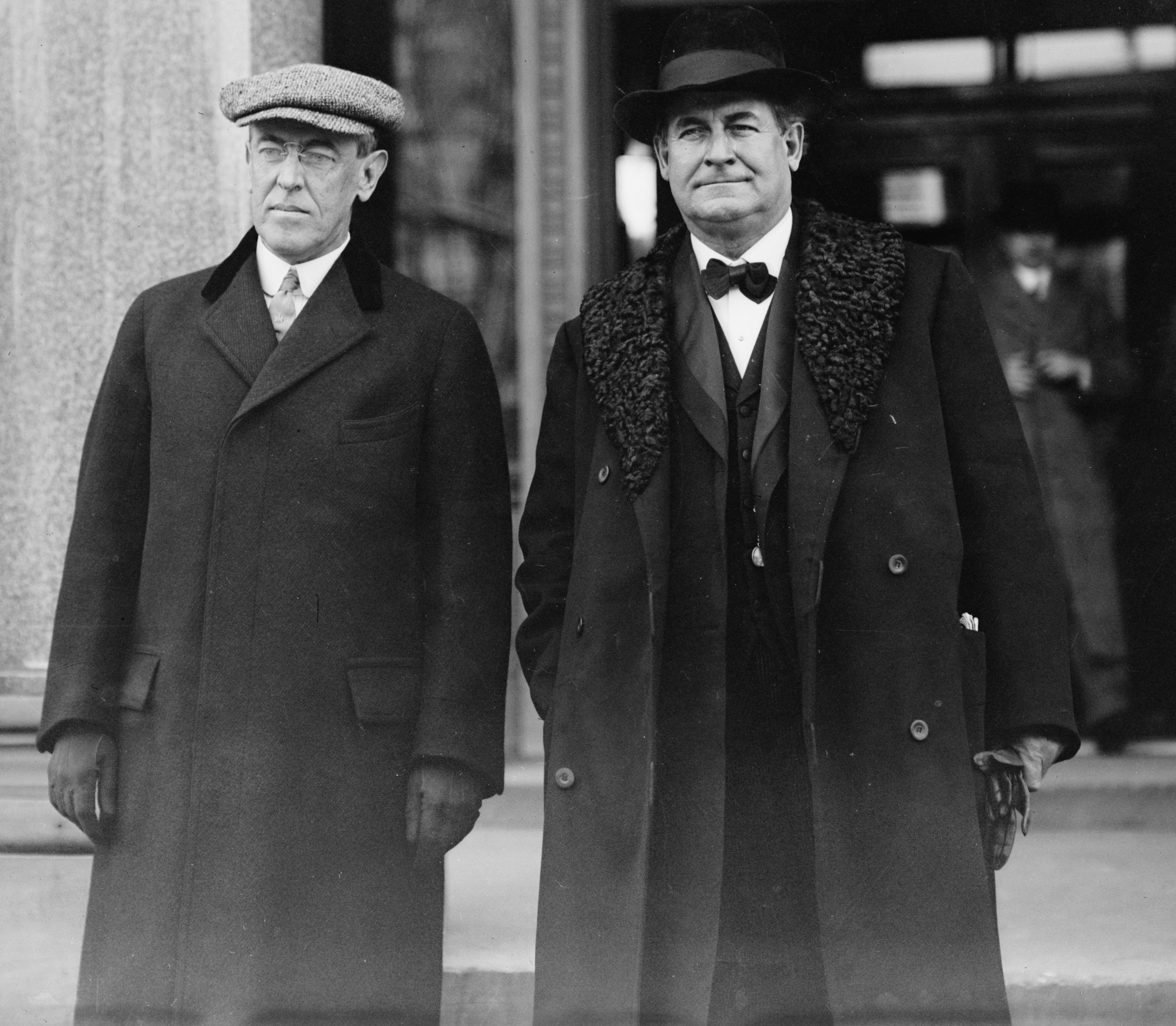
Wilson (left) with William Jennings Bryan in Trenton, New Jersey on December 21, 1912

There was great pressure for Wilson to appoint three-time unsuccessful Democratic presidential nominee William Jennings Bryan to a position in his Cabinet. Bryan visited Wilson in Trenton on December 21, and an agreement was reached that he would serve as secretary of state. Bryan would end up being the only member of Wilson's Cabinet to have their own independent national political base of support.

It would take weeks for Wilson to settle on any additional Cabinet picks. However, his Cabinet was taking shape. By January 9, at least half the individuals he would ultimately place in his Cabinet were already under strong consideration. By the end of January, Wilson had made decisions on several Cabinet positions, but had not yet formally extended invitations to these selections.

At the end of January, Wilson invited William Gibbs McAdoo to serve as his secretary of the treasury.

By mid-February, Wilson chose Albert Sidney Burleson to serve as postmaster general, Josephus Daniels to serve as secretary of the navy, David F. Houston to serve as secretary of agriculture, and William Bauchop Wilson as secretary of labor. Burleston and Daniels accepted their positions by letters on February 25.

Wilson selected James Clark McReynolds for attorney general. He formally accepted the job by letter on February 25. He selected William C. Redfield for secretary of commerce, offering him the job on February 26, and receiving his acceptance on February 28.

In choosing his secretary of the interior, Wilson wished to choose someone that would avoid tough conservation policies, keeping in mind the Pinchot–Ballinger controversy of the Taft administration. Wilson first invited Newton D. Baker to hold the position, but Baker declined, and Franklin Knight Lane was selected to hold the position. Wilson then, in mid-February, decided he would prefer to have Lane instead serve as secretary of war, and have Walter Hines Page serve as secretary of the interior. Wilson went as far as requesting a meeting with Baker to arrange this, but before the meeting was held, was convinced that Congress would not confirm a southerner as secretary of war, due to the Grand Army of the Republic's almost certain objection to a southerner holding a role that supervised the Bureau of Pensions. Wilson dropped this plan, and kept Lane as his choice for secretary of the interior.

After dropping the plan to have Lane serve as secretary of war, Wilson offered the position of secretary of war to A. Mitchell Palmer, who declined the position, citing his Quaker faith. With days left to his inauguration, Wilson accepted a suggestion by Joseph Patrick Tumulty, and chose Lindley Miller Garrison for the position. Garrison formally accepted the job by letter on February 25.

Wilson had initially given serious contemplation to placing Louis Brandeis in his Cabinet, considering him for attorney general and later secretary of commerce, but dropped the idea due to Brandeis' liberalism having made him be seen as radical, causing him to be opposed by the Democratic Party leadership in Brandeis' own home state.

==== Other appointees ====
On February 3, Wilson announced that Joseph Patrick Tumulty would serve as secretary to the president. This was the only announcement he made ahead of his inauguration about the staffing of his administration.

=== Policy and political matters ===
After his election, many groups sought to brief Wilson on various positions and matters.

During the transition, to learn more about the prospect of granting independence to the Philippines (which was, at the time, a United States territory), Wilson had Henry Jones Ford travel there on a secret fact-finding mission. The Jones Law was under consideration at the time, which addressed the possibility of granting Philippine independence.

During the transition, Wilson largely avoided taking stances on hot-button issues before the lame duck congress. The norms at the time for presidential transitions had been that presidents-elect would generally stay away from Washington, D.C. until shortly before their inauguration, and would keep themselves busy with forming their cabinet and other work, avoiding making statements or taking actions that would weaken the ability of the outgoing president to conduct their job as president.

An exception to Wilson staying removed from hot button issues took place when Wilson wrote a letter in late November that would be privately seen by many Democrats, but kept private from the public, which argued against the idea of creating a term limit on the presidency that would limit occupants to a single six-year term. On February 1, 1913, the Senate passed a resolution to that effect, by a vote of 47 to 23. The idea of creating a single six-year presidential term had been discussed for many years, particularly by Democrats, and had been included in the official 1912 party platforms of both the Democratic and Republican Parties. Outgoing Republican president William Howard Taft, in his lame duck period, voiced continued support for the idea, and so did prominent Democrat William Jennings Bryan. Wilson's opposition may have helped to kill any action on moving to put in place an amendment that would create such a term-limit.

Another instance where Wilson chimed in on a hot-button issue was his urging of Republican members of Congress to pass banking and currency reform.

As the effective head of the Democratic Party, Wilson had some political obligations during his transition. A number of state legislatures selected their state's United States senators in January and February. With complicated three-way power splits in a number of state legislatures between Democrats, Republicans, and Progressives, in a number of states compromises had to be brokered in order to get the requisite consensus to elect senators. Democratic leaders in a number of states where Democrats lacked the power and leverage to push through a Democratic senate candidate sought Wilson's advice on whether or not they should broker deals with the Progressive Party in which they would support a Progressive Party candidate for United States Senate. Documents from the transition seem to indicate that Wilson generally gave only summary responses to their queries.

== Correspondence and relations between Wilson and Taft ==
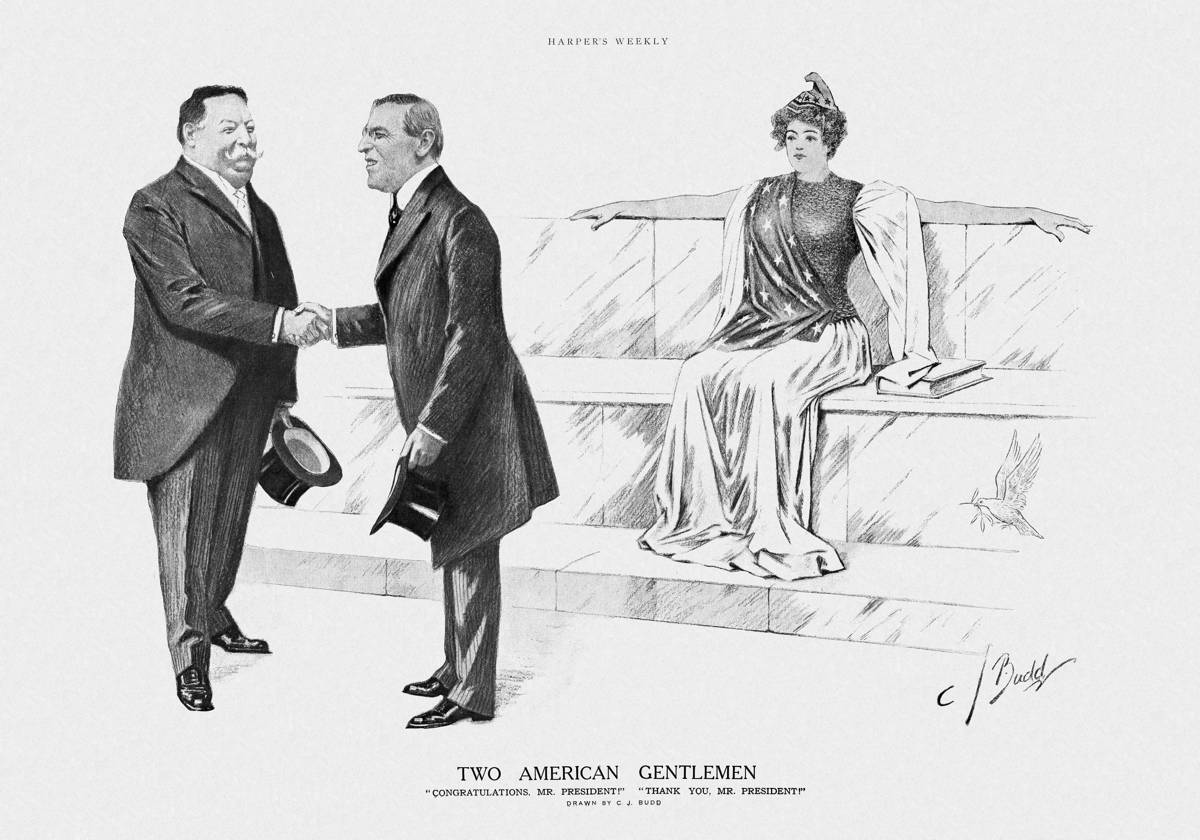
“Two American Gentlemen”, a political cartoon illustrated by Charles Jay Budd that was published on November 9, 1912 in Harper's Weekly. Celebrating the peaceful transition of power, it portrays Wilson and outgoing president William Howard Taft shaking hands as Columbia, a national personification of the United States, watches them

The norm for previous presidential transitions at the time was that the incoming and outgoing administrations had generally had limited relations. There had been discussion between the incoming and outgoing administrations about matters related to the inauguration and the logistics of moving the new administration into the White House, but matters related to governing were generally not discussed in past transitions.

On November 28, Taft extended a direct invitation Wilson and his wife Ellen Axson Wilson to visit the White House, offering to provide Wilson with information that would be useful to him. He also inquired whether Wilson had any interest in taking a trip to inspect the Panama Canal, similar to a trip that Taft was planning to make himself. On December 2, Wilson politely expressed disinterest in both offers. This correspondence, however, served as an icebreaker between the president and president-elect, and they continued to correspondence during the transition, discussing a number of matters. However, there correspondence was still rather limited. Wilson was largely uninterested in consulting with Taft or principal members of the Taft administration.

Despite Wilson's disinterest in consulting with the Taft administration. A number of officials in the Taft administration made efforts to reach out to Wilson, hoping to be able to establish communication and provide him with information on government matters, but these proved to be largely fruitless efforts.

Even when there were crisis developments related to the Mexican Revolution in February, it does not appear that Wilson was interested in consulting with the Taft administration on the developments, and it appears that he did not address the crisis during the transition.
