= Presidential transition of Warren G. Harding =

Transfer of presidential power from Woodrow Wilson to Warren G. Harding

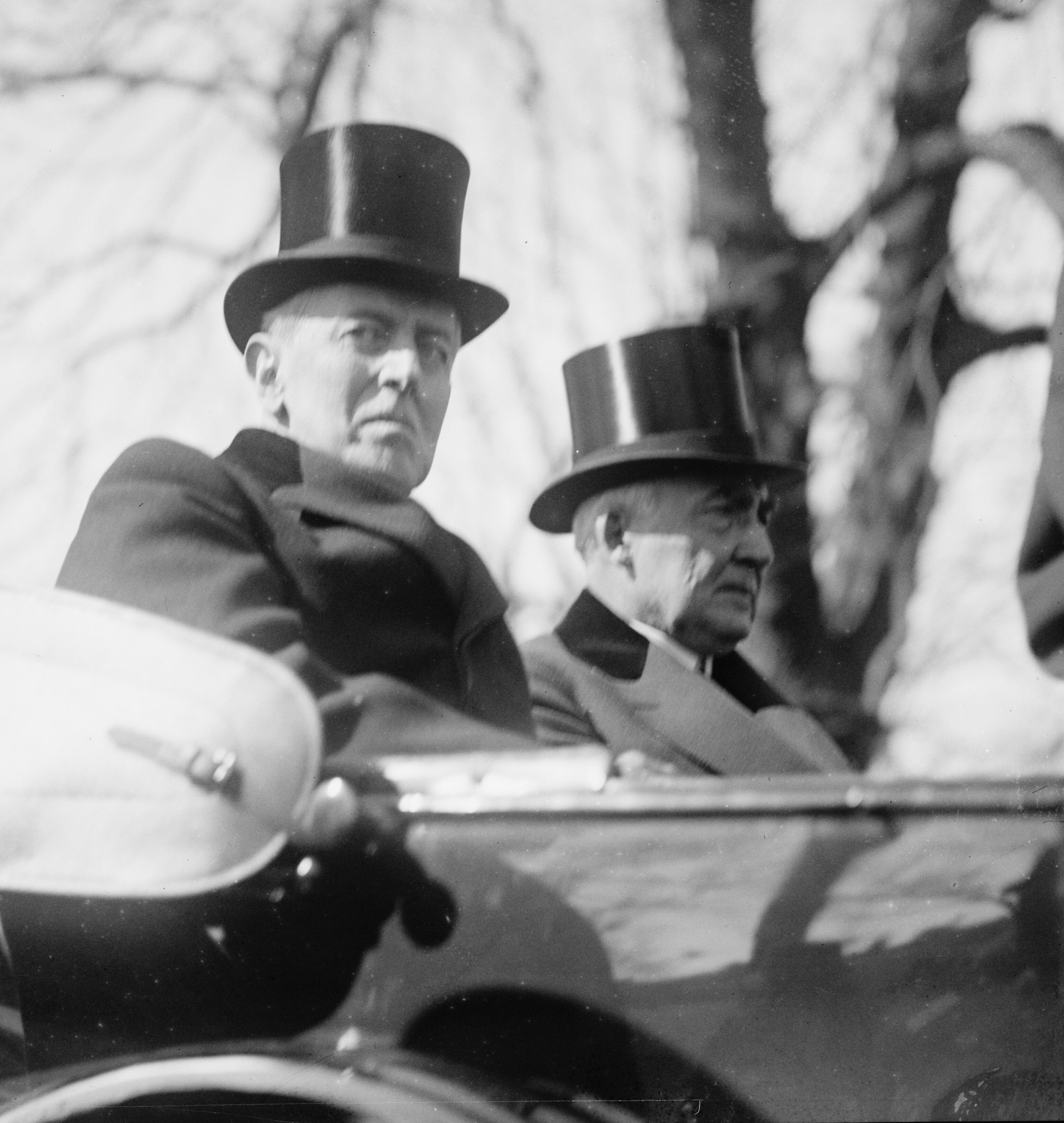
- President Wilson (left) and President-elect Harding (right) ride together to Harding's inauguration
- Election date: November 2, 1920
- Inauguration date: March 4, 1921
- President-elect: Warren G. Harding (Republican)
- Vice president-elect: Calvin Coolidge (Republican)
- Outgoing president: Woodrow Wilson (Democrat)
- Outgoing vice president: Thomas R. Marshall (Democrat)

The presidential transition of Warren G. Harding began when he won the United States 1920 United States presidential election, becoming the president-elect, and ended when Harding was inaugurated at noon EST on March 4, 1921.

Harding began his transition with roughly a month of traveling, which he wrapped with a two-day trip to Washington, D.C. There he met with officials and delivered his farewell address as a member of the United States Senate. He then, in early December, returned to his home in Marion, Ohio. There he conducted transition business, including formulating policy and selecting appointees for his administration. He then continued this work while vacationing in Florida from late-January to late-February.

== Background ==
A presidential transition was guaranteed to occur in 1920, as incumbent president Woodrow Wilson was not nominated for reelection by the Democratic Party.

At the time that Harding's occurred, the term "presidential transition" had yet to be widely applied to the period between an individual's election as president of the United States and their assumption of the office.

== Harding's staff and advisors during transition ==
Judson Welliver served as the president-elect's public relations manager. Harry M. Daugherty served as Harding's "personal representative", a role which saw him meet with those visiting Harding and conduct confidential errands across the country on Harding's behalf. In his book Presidential Transitions, Laurin L. Henry wrote that positioning individuals for patronage appointments seemed to be in Daugherty's purview during the transition.

Key members of Harding's entourage that seemed to have been interviewing officials on Harding's behalf included Albert Bacon Fall, Harry M. Daugherty, and John W. Weeks.

Other key members of Harding's staff included George B. Christian Jr., Charles E. Sawyer, and Judson Welliver. Harding also had a sizable clerical staff in Marion.

== Initial post-election traveling ==
Early into the transition period, Harding traveled, largely vacationing. At the time, it was common for president-elects to take weeks long vacations following their election, as presidential transitions were longer than they have been more recently (the Twentieth Amendment to the United States Constitution would shorten transitions), and were far less substantial in scale compared to the large operations of more recent presidential transitions.

=== Port Isabel, Texas ===
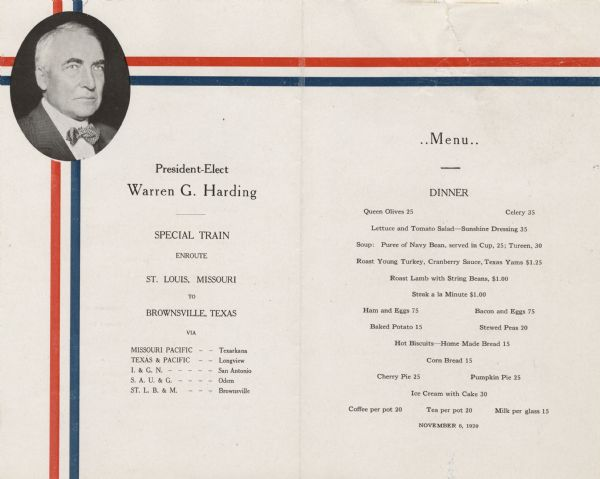
Dinner menu from the special train which carried Harding from St. Louis to Port Isabel, Texas

Harding, after his election victory, left his home in Marion, Ohio, and took a train trip down to Port Isabel, Texas in the company of key members of his staff, such as George B. Christian Jr., Harry M. Daugherty, Charles E. Sawyer, and Judson Welliver. The train made occasional whistle stop appearances along the route. In Port Isabel, Harding spend several days relaxing, with activities including golfing, fishing, and hunting. Harding gave an Armistice Day speech in nearby Brownsville, Texas.

=== Trip to Panama ===
On November 17, Harding departed from Brownsville to head to New Orleans, Louisiana, arriving the next day. Once in New Orleans made a brief speech from the steps of the city hall. That evening, Harding left New Orleans for a cruise to Panama.

Harding arrived in Panama on November 23. He insisted that he be treated as a private visitor rather than an official visitor to Panama. He spent most of his time in Panama sightseeing and vacationing, but also toured the Panama Canal Zone defenses and held discussions with the key individuals stationed there.

Harding left Panama on November 28. His ship briefly stopped in Kingston, Jamaica on November 30, and arrived at Newport News, Virginia on December 4. In Newport News, he was greeted by his advisor Harry M. Daugherty. Harding then spent a day visiting Norfolk-area Army and Navy installations. The following day he gave an address about brotherhood at the Elks National Home in Bedford, Virginia.

=== First post-election visit to Washington, D.C. ===
At 11:20 PM Eastern Time on December 5, Harding arrived in Washington, D.C. by train. Harding had arrived for the opening of the second session of the 66th United States Congress. Harding was still a member of the United States Senate. On December 6, Harding delivered a farewell speech in the Senate Chamber. Harding, however, would not formally resign his Senate seat until January 13 (having submitted a resignation letter on January 9, which would take effect on the 13th). The reason that Harding continued to hold his seat until January was that it would not be until then that James M. Cox (incidentally his Democratic opponent in the presidential election) would leave office as governor of Ohio, and be succeeded by Republican Harry L. Davis. If Harding resigned before the change in governors, Cox would be able to name a Democrat to fill his Senate seat.

Harding followed his farewell speech with a press conference, where he confirmed that he would call a special session of Congress following his inauguration.

Harding spent the rest of the day, and the day after, holding meetings with members of Congress and with other leaders of the Republican Party.

Harding did not meet with President Wilson. However, his wife, Florence Harding, did meet with First Lady Edith Wilson at the White House on December 7, and received a tour of the White House from her.

== Transition work in Marion and Florida ==
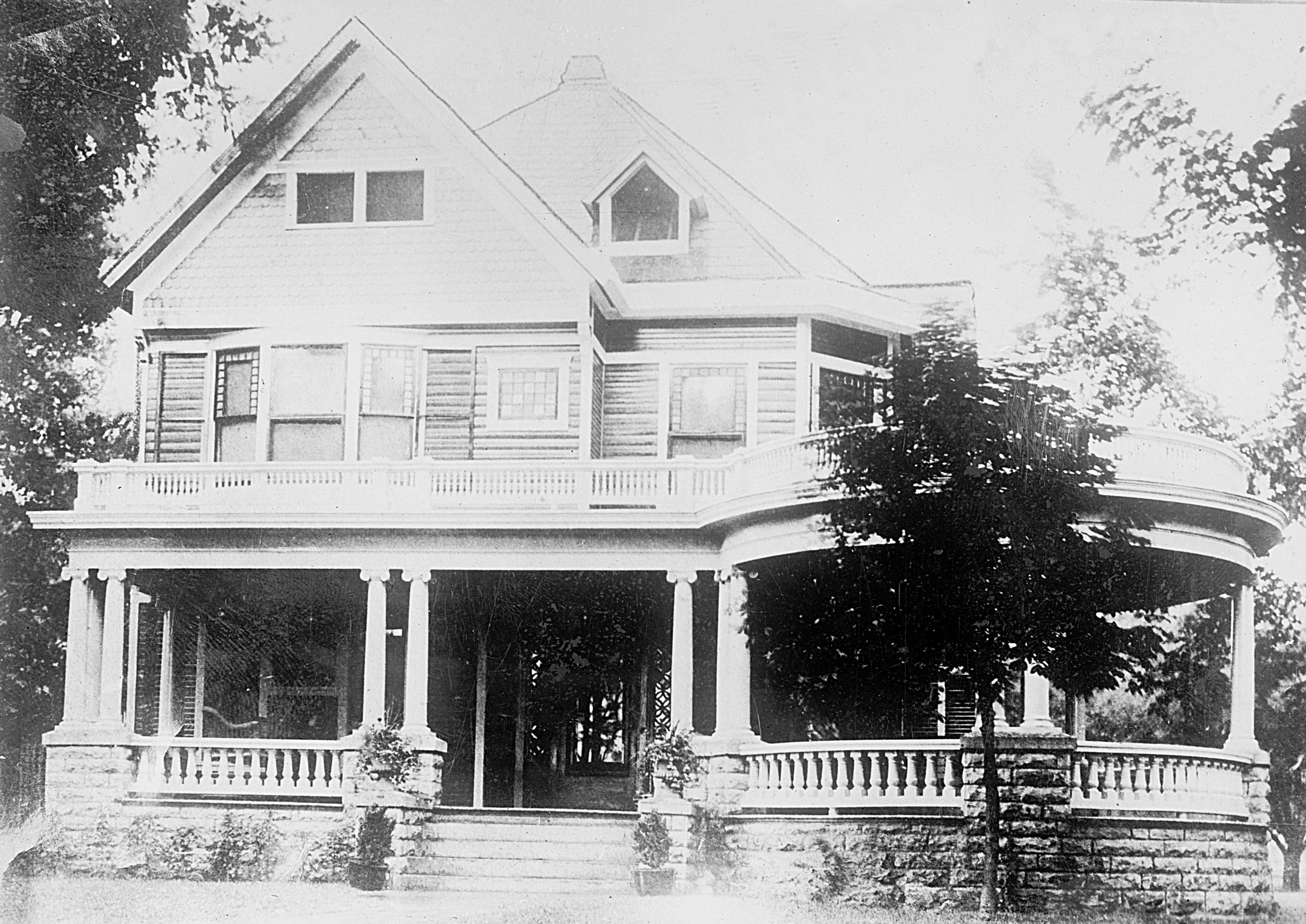
Harding Home in Marion, Ohio, where Harding conducted much of his work on transition matters

After his trip to Washington, D.C., Harding returned to his home in Marion, Ohio on December 9. At his house, he then began work on preparing to take office. Transition activities also overflowed into the house of Harding's neighbor George Christian.

In Marion, Harding made himself available to reporters, but was not always willing to be directly quoted. There were also regularly press briefings about what happened at the meetings held for the transition, and information was also frequently leaked.

After roughly five weeks of transition work in Marion, Harding continued his transition work while vacationing in Florida from January 22 through February 27. In Florida, he, for the majority of his time, stayed in St. Augustine.

=== Correspondence ===
While in Marion during December and January, Harding and his team had a lot of correspondence they needed to conduct. The clerical staff, as well as principal staffers such as George B. Christian Jr., Harry M. Daugherty, and Judson Welliver conducted most of the correspondence, but some correspondence required the president-elect's attention.

=== Visitors ===
There were many individuals that visited Marion during December and January. Some were potential Cabinet selections. However, there were many visits from other leading political figures. Additionally, there were visits from lesser political figures, including local and state Republican leaders.

There were also visits from representatives of various groups, including business groups, farmer organizations, fraternal organizations, patriotic organizations, trade unions, and veterans organizations. One example of this was when a sizable delegation from the Child Conservation League visited Harding on December 15 (Harding read this delegation a prepared statement, and secured their support for his proposal to create a federal public welfare department).

While Harding had, by leaving Washington, D.C. for Marion, strongly signaled his intent to not play an active leadership role in the lame duck congressional session, he did receive occasional visits to Marion from Congressional Republican leaders seeking to discuss matters that were pending in the Congress.

On December 16, Vice President-elect Calvin Coolidge and his wife Grace Coolidge visited Marion, and the vice president-elect met with the president-elect. It was reported Harding and Coolidge discussed choices for Cabinet appointments, and that Harding, with strong reluctance, consented to Coolidge's request that Coolidge be allowed, as vice president, to regularly attend Cabinet meetings and take part in the administration's councils, which would be a departure from convention.

Harding continued to receive a great number of visitors while in St. Augustine.

=== Policy formulation ===
Harding lacked firm positions on a number of policy issues, and had expressed his willingness to act as an instrument of the Republican Party. He also was, in the words of Laurin L. Henry, "committed to the role of the accommodating and conciliating leader", and, therefore, sought the approval of party elders on all matters. On policy maters involving Congress, Harding would seek out the views of both experts and leading legislators, and would seek to incorporate them into a party agenda. Therefore, the process of formulating policy during the transition has been characterized by Laurin L. Henry as "a exercise in group thinking".

A major policy question was whether the United States would enter the League of Nations. Harding gave some signs that he might allow the United States to enter the League of Nations, even requesting that Charles Evans Hughes revise the Treaty of Versailles in order to "secure its ratification in the Senate." However, he also gave some signs that he would not support entering the League of Nations.

=== Selection of appointees ===
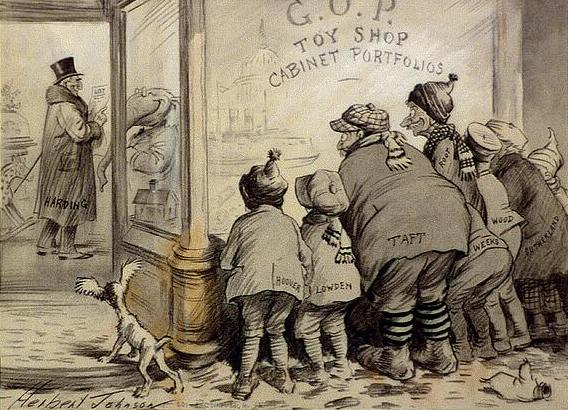
"President-elect Warren G. Harding choosing a cabinet", a political cartoon by Herbert Johnson

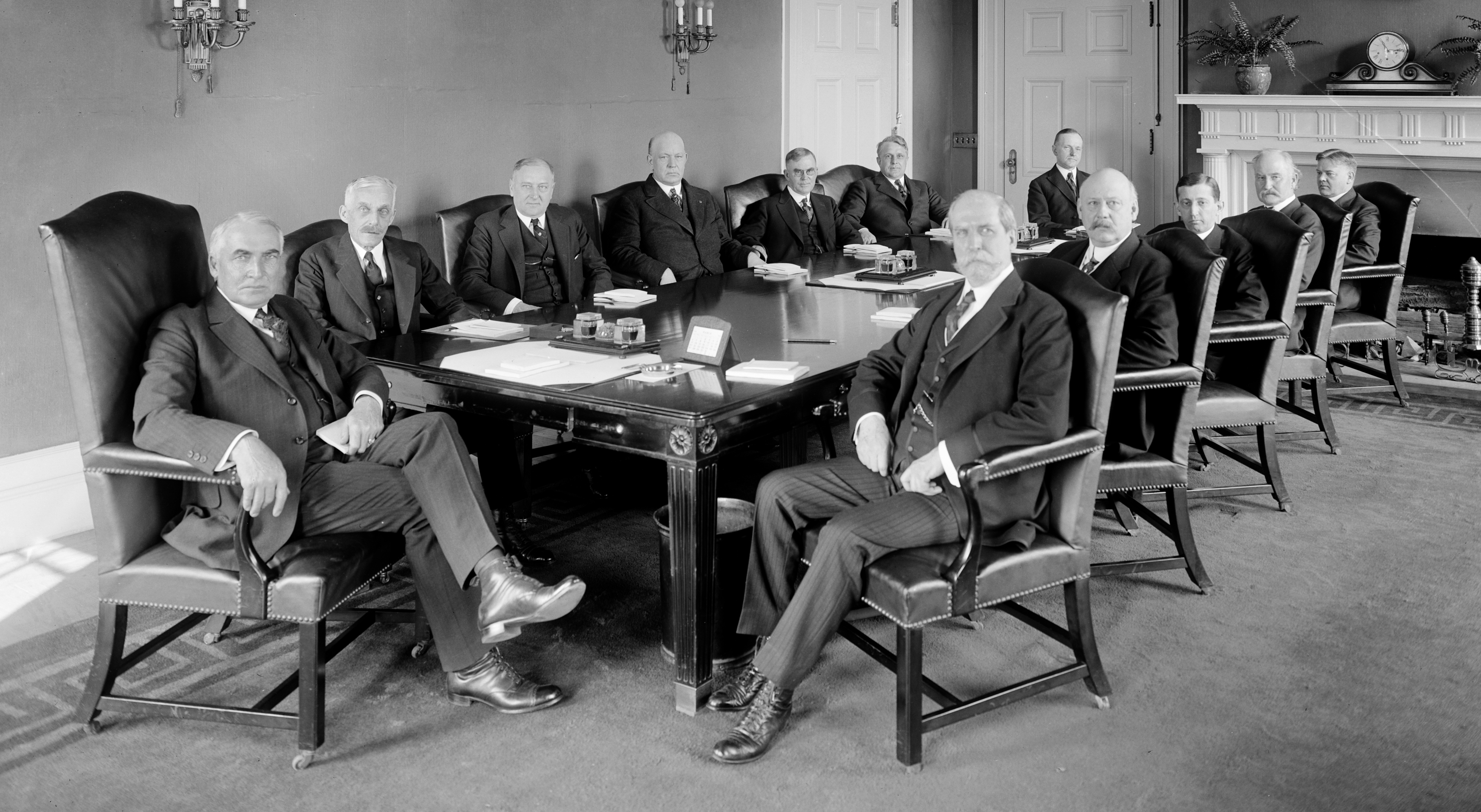
Harding's first Cabinet in 1921, after he took office

Albert J. Beveridge declined an offer to join Harding's Cabinet due to his belief that Harding might enter the United States into the League of Nations, which Beveridge strongly opposed.

By late December, with many Cabinet selections appearing to have been in place, news editorials speculated that Harding would soon make an early announcement of some of his Cabinet selections, in order help enable for designees to be able to both familiarize themselves with their pending jobs and work with Republican leaders of the lame duck Congress. At the end of the month, reporters anticipated such announcements, but they did not materialize.

Most of Harding's choices, as rumors leaked of their selection, faced opposition from figures within his party.

==== Attorney general ====
By December 24, it was being reported that Harding desired to make Harry M. Daugherty his administration's attorney general. This came despite Daugherty's lack of high standing in the field of law. Senator James Wadsworth Jr., who visited Harding in Marion on December 19, would later recall that he and others had, to no avail, made efforts to persuade Harding against this selection. On February 21, Harding announced to reporters at the St. Augustine hotel where he was staying that Daugherty would be his choice for attorney general, and defended Daugherty's qualifications. On February 21, Harding announced to reporters at the St. Augustine hotel where he was staying that Daugherty would be his choice for attorney general, and defended Daugherty's qualifications.

==== Postmaster general ====
By the final week of December, it appeared all but certain that Will H. Hays would be Harding's choice for postmaster general. The prospective choice faced opposition from leaders in his home state, and many considered him inexperienced.

==== Secretary of agriculture ====
On December 20, Henry Cantwell Wallace met with Harding in Marion. He was selected for secretary of agriculture. When rumors of this selection broke, it faced strong backlash from the meat packing industry, which had great sway in the Republican Party.

==== Secretary of commerce ====
On December 12, Herbert Hoover met with Harding in Marion. Hoover was selected for secretary of commerce.

Hoover was a choice that came with political risks. He was likely to be opposed by the right-wing of Republican Party for a number of reasons, including that Hoover was suspected to have only recently become a Republican, he was an internationalist who supported the League of Nations, a progressive, and had previously been a member of administration of Democrat Woodrow Wilson. Indeed, once rumors of selection began to circulate in mid-December, it encountered criticism. Among the old guard of the Republican Party, Hoover was, perhaps, the pick that received the strongest opposition. Hoping to pressure Harding against this choice for secretary of commerce, Senator Philander C. Knox visited Harding in Marion on Decenter 30, and expressed both his and fellow Pennsylvania U.S. Senator Boies Penrose's opposition to both Hoover for secretary of commerce and Charles Evans Hughes for secretary of state. Outrage against Hoover did not dissipate.

After an agreement was reached on February 24 between Harding and Hoover, it was announced that he would be Harding's choice for secretary of commerce.

==== Secretary of the interior ====
On December 15, Albert B. Fall met with Harding in Marion. Harding would select him for secretary of the interior. Harding had also contemplated Fall as a candidate for the position of secretary of state.

==== Secretary of labor ====
In his 1960 book Presidential Transitions, Laurin L. Henry wrote that secretary of labor appears to have been the only cabinet position that Harding had not decided upon at least a preliminary favorite for by the end of December.

Perhaps under the influence of Pennsylvania U.S. Senators Philander C. Knox and Boies Penrose, after Knox's late-December visit with him in Marion, Harding offered James J. Davis the position on January 10.

==== Secretary of the navy ====
By the final week of December, Harding had chosen John W. Weeks for be his secretary of the navy. Harding would ultimately reassign him to the position of secretary of war after discussions with him in mid-January. On January 17, Harding offered Frank Orren Lowden a choice between secretary of the navy or being a diplomat in charge of an embassy. On January 27, Lowden sent Harding a telegram declining the position of secretary of the navy. On February 10, Harding asked him to reconsider the offer, only to have Lowden decline it again two days later. On February 14, Harding again asked Lowden to take the office, telling him that he was not simply offering the post as a courtesy to Lowden, but, rather, because Harding strongly desired to have someone from Illinois in his Cabinet. The next day, Lowden politely, but firmly, declined the position for a third time. After this, Harding came to terms with the reality that Lowden was not interested in the position. A.T. Hert was considered for the position afterwards.

Harding had decided on Edwin Denby for the position by late December, and this choice was seen as an utter surprise. On February 26, Denby visited Haring in St. Augustine. The following day, at a press conference, he was introduced as Harding's selection for the position.

==== Secretary of state ====
Harding had initially considered Albert B. Fall, who he selected for secretary of the interior, as a potential choice for secretary of state. He was strongly advised against this, however.

Charles Evans Hughes met with Harding in Marion on December 10, the first individual to visit Harding in Marion for a meeting once he returned. Harding asked him to be his secretary of state. After consulting about the offer with his law partners in New York, Hughes wrote Harding on December 13 to accept the offer. On December 22, Harding wrote Hughes to officially further confirm and finalize that he would be his choice for the job.

The choice encountered criticism from the right wing of the party when rumors about it began to circulate in mid-December. Hughes was criticized by the party establishment as being too much of an internationalist and too much of an independent. Hoping to pressure Harding against this choice for secretary of state, Senator Philander C. Knox, himself a former secretary of state, visited Harding in Marion on Decenter 30, and expressed both his and fellow Pennsylvania U.S. Senator Boies Penrose's opposition to both Hughes for secretary of state and Herbert Hoover for secretary of commerce.

The uproar against Hughes largely dissipated by February. On February 19, Hughes visited Harding in St. Augustine, and was presented at a press conference as Harding's choice for secretary of state.

==== Secretary of the treasury ====
It was known that Harding desired not to give the post of secretary of the treasury to an individual who would be a tool of Wall Street. Frank Orren Lowden had received much speculation early on as a prospective choice for the position. While Harding thought positively of Lowden, he was also interested in Charles G. Dawes for the position, who he offered the position to when they met in Marion on December 20. When rumors broke of Dawes being chosen for the position, the choice was opposed by William Hale Thompson, the Republican mayor of Dawes' home city of Chicago. It was also opposed by Republican members of the Chicago City Council.

Harding relented to right-wing pressure for a more right-wing secretary of the treasury, and selected Andrew Mellon instead to appease them. Mellon visited Harding in Marion on January 8. Mellon had, at that meeting, expressed reluctance towards holding the position.

==== Secretary of war ====
By late December, Harding was giving serious consideration to selecting Leonard Wood for secretary of war. Harding had been sending signals to Wood that he would be offered a cabinet position. In early January, significant Republican figures such as Henry L. Stimson were strongly lobbying on behalf of Wood for Harding to give him the position. The prospect of Wood holding the position, however, also faced criticism from others. One area of criticism was the appropriateness of appointing an individual directly from service as an active duty general to the civilian role of secretary of war. By the second week of January, Wood was no longer being considered for Harding's Cabinet.

John W. Weeks, originally Harding's selection for secretary of the navy, was reassigned to this position after discussions with him in mid-January.

==== Other positions ====
In late-November, while Harding was still conducting his initial post-election travels, there had been reports that he was planning to ask congress to create a new cabinet position, "secretary of education", to which he planned to appoint a woman, likely Harriet Taylor Upton. This did not materialize. It would be more than a decade before the nation would come to see its first female Cabinet member with Frances Perkins in 1933.

Laurin L. Henry wrote in Presidential Transitions that patronage appointments seemed to be in Harry M. Daugherty's purview during the transition.

On February 27, at the same time that Edwin Denby was announced as secretary of the navy, it was also announced that Theodore Roosevelt Jr. would serve as assistant secretary of the navy. This was seen as a gesture of good faith toward's that Republican Party's Bull Moose-Wood faction.

It was announced in the closing days of the transition that George B. Christian Jr. would serve as secretary to the president and Charles E. Sawyer would serve as White House physician.
