= Presidential transition of Abraham Lincoln =

Transfer of presidential power from James Buchanan to Abraham Lincoln

- Election date: November 6, 1860
- Inauguration date: March 4, 1861
- President-elect: Abraham Lincoln (Republican)
- Vice president-elect: Hannibal Hamlin (Republican)
- Outgoing president: James Buchanan (Democrat)
- Outgoing vice president: John C. Breckinridge (Democrat)

The presidential transition of Abraham Lincoln began when he won the United States 1860 United States presidential election, becoming the president-elect of the United States, and ended when Lincoln was inaugurated on March 4, 1861.

The secession crisis of 1860–61 began soon after Lincoln became president-elect. This has been widely considered the most difficult crisis that any president-elect has faced during his transition into office. Lincoln spent much of his transition period trying to avert southern secession.

During his transition, President-elect Lincoln selected members of the Cabinet and attempted to prevent the secession of southern states. Lincoln delivered an emotional farewell address when departing his hometown of Springfield, Illinois, for the District of Columbia (the nation's capital). His trip to the District of Columbia was done covertly to avoid a potential assassination attempt (the Baltimore Plot).

Due to the outbreak of a civil war and the relative inaction of the outgoing administration to quell it, the transition between the Buchanan and Lincoln presidencies is frequently described to have been the worst in United States history.

== Lincoln's election victory ==
In the presidential election held on November 6, 1860, Lincoln was elected the 16th president. By November 7, the day after the election, newspapers had begun reporting that Lincoln had won the election. His strong electoral college victory was entirely due to his victories in states located in the North and West. No ballots were cast for him in ten of the fifteen Southern slave states, and he won only two of 996 counties in all the Southern states.

== Secession crisis ==
The South was outraged by Lincoln's election and in response secessionists implemented plans to leave the Union before he took office in March 1861. Following his victory, all the slave states began to consider secession. The move for secession in these states was motivated by worry that a Lincoln presidency (including the appointment by Lincoln of federal officials, district attorneys, marshals, postmasters, and judges in southern states) jeopardized the institution of slavery in the United States.

Lincoln was not scheduled to take office until March 4, 1861, leaving incumbent Democratic President James Buchanan, a "doughface" from Pennsylvania who had been favorable to the South, to preside over the country until that time. President Buchanan declared that secession was illegal but denied that the government had any power to resist it. Lincoln had no official power to act while the secession crisis escalated. Nonetheless, Lincoln was barraged with advice. Many wanted him to provide reassurances to the South that their interests were not being threatened. Realizing that soothing words on the rights of slaveholders would alienate the Republican base, while taking a strong stand on the indestructibility of the Union would further inflame Southerners, Lincoln chose a policy of silence. He believed that, given enough time without any overt acts or threats to the South, Southern unionists would carry the day and bring their states back into the Union. At the suggestion of a Southern merchant who contacted him, Lincoln did make an indirect appeal to the South by providing material for Senator Lyman Trumbull to insert into his own public address. Republicans praised Trumbull's address, Democrats assailed it, and the South largely ignored it.

In December 1860, both the House and Senate formed special committees to address the unfolding crisis. Lincoln communicated with various congressmen that there was room for negotiation on issues such as fugitive slaves, slavery in the District of Columbia, and the domestic slave trade. However, he made it clear that he was unalterably opposed to anything that would allow the expansion of slavery into the territories. On December 6, Lincoln wrote to Congressman Orlando Kellogg, a Republican on the special House committee, that Kellogg should "entertain no proposition for a compromise in regard to the extension of slavery. The instant you do, they have us under again; all our labor is lost, and sooner or later must be done over. Douglas is sure to be again trying to bring in his [popular sovereignty]. Have none of it. The tug has to come & better now than later."

Among the special committees created in December was the Committee of Thirty-three, created on December 4, 1860. The committee, composed of a congressman from each of the 33 states, recommended enforcing the Fugitive Slave Act, admitting New Mexico as a slave state, and repealing the personal liberty laws in the Northern states (which prevented the return of fugitive slaves), and passing a constitutional amendment prohibiting interference with slavery. Lincoln rejected all these suggestions.

In mid-December, Senator John J. Crittenden of Kentucky, the chairman of the special Senate committee, proposed a package of six constitutional amendments, known as the Crittenden Compromise. The compromise would protect slavery in federal territories south of the 36°30′ parallel and prohibit it in territories north of that latitude, with newly admitted states deciding on the status of slavery within their borders. Congress would be forbidden from abolishing slavery in any state (or the District of Columbia) or interfering with the domestic slave trade. Despite pressure from Seward, Lincoln and his Republican Party refused to support the compromise, which was contrary to the party's platform of free-soil in the territories. Still opposed to the expansion of slavery into the territories, Lincoln had privately asked Republican Senators to oppose the compromise, and it failed to pass Congress. Lincoln declared, "I will suffer death before I consent ... to any concession or compromise which looks like buying the privilege to take possession of this government to which we have a constitutional right."

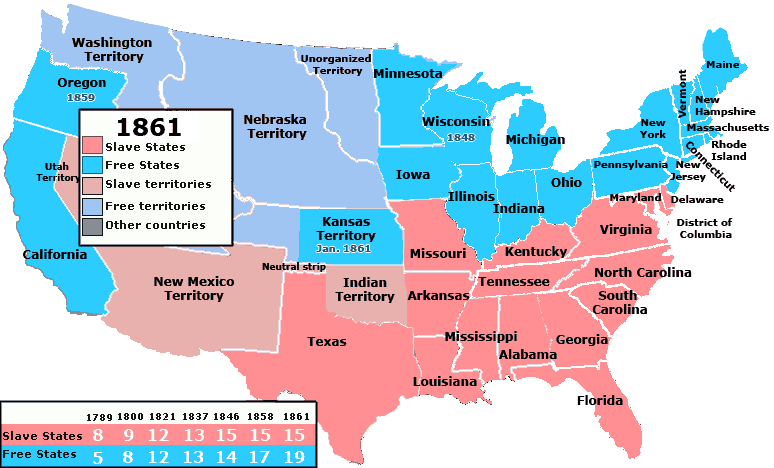
Following the admission of Kansas in 1861, there were 19 free states and 15 slave states.

Lincoln believed that Southern threats of secession were mostly bluster and that the sectional crisis would be defused, as it had been in 1820 and 1850. However, many Southerners were convinced that assenting to Lincoln's presidency and the prohibition of slavery in the territories would ultimately lead to the extinction of slavery in the United States. On December 20, 1860, South Carolina voted to secede, and six other Southern states seceded over the next forty days. In February, these Southern states formed the Confederate States of America (CSA) and on February 9, elected Jefferson Davis as provisional president. Despite the formation of the CSA, the slave-holding states of Arkansas, North Carolina, Tennessee, Virginia, Delaware, Maryland, Kentucky, and Missouri still remained in the union, and the last four in this list, known as the border states, never seceded. President Buchanan and President-elect Lincoln refused to recognize the Confederacy, declaring secession illegal.

In February 1861, two final political efforts were made to preserve the Union. The first was made by a group of 131 delegates sent by 21 states to a Peace Conference, held at Willard's Hotel in the nation's capital. The convention submitted to Congress a seven-point constitutional amendment proposal similar in content to the earlier Crittenden Compromise. The proposal was rejected by the Senate and never considered by the House. The second effort was an ostensibly unrepealable constitutional amendment that would shield domestic institutions of the states from congressional interference and from future constitutional amendments, protecting slavery in states where it already existed but not contravening Lincoln's requirement that slavery not be extended to Western territories. Commonly known as the Corwin Amendment, the measure was approved by Congress and had Lincoln's tacit support. A few weeks before the war, he sent a letter to every governor informing them that Congress had passed a joint resolution to amend the Constitution. However the amendment soon fell out of favor and was ratified by only a handful of states.

== Formation of Cabinet and administration ==
Lincoln began the process of assembling his Cabinet on election night. Lincoln would later recount to having crafted the general framework of his Cabinet on the night of the election. Lincoln had likely made some decisions about the shape of his administration even before this.

Lincoln's Cabinet decisions were likely further shaped throughout the month of November. Throughout this month Lincoln read many private letters from numerous figures and spoke with a number of prominent politicians that visited with him. He also had a few meetings in Chicago with Vice President-elect Hannibal Hamlin.

In an attempt to create a Cabinet that would unite the Republican Party, Lincoln sought to reach out to every faction of his party, with a special emphasis on balancing former Whigs with former Democrats. Lincoln's eventual Cabinet would include all of his main rivals for the Republican nomination. He did not shy away from surrounding himself with strong-minded men, even those whose credentials for office appeared to be much more impressive than his own. Though the cabinet appointees held different views on economic issues, all opposed the extension of slavery into the territories.

The first Cabinet position filled was that of secretary of state. It was tradition for the president-elect to offer this, the most senior cabinet post, to the leading (best-known and most popular) person of his political party. For the Republican Party of the time, William H. Seward was that figure. On December 8, 1860, Lincoln wrote a letter to Seward informing him that he was his pick for secretary of state. Additionally, in mid-December 1860, Vice President-elect Hannibal Hamlin, directly offered the position to Seward on Lincoln's behalf. Seward had been deeply disappointed by his failure to win the 1860 Republican presidential nomination, but he agreed to serve as Lincoln's Secretary of State. By the end of December, Lincoln had received a note from Seward informing him that he would accept the position.

Lincoln's choice for secretary of the treasury was Ohio U.S. Senator Salmon P. Chase, Seward's chief political rival. Chase was the leader of the more radical faction of Republicans that sought to abolish slavery as quickly as possible. Seward, among others, opposed the selection of Chase because of both his strong antislavery record and his opposition to any type of settlement with the South that could be considered appeasement for slaveholders. Though he had preferred Chase, Lincoln originally offered the job to Pennsylvania U.S. Senator Simon Cameron. After meeting with Cameron in Springfield, Illinois (where Lincoln resided) on December 30 and 31, Lincoln gave Cameron a letter on December 31 offering him the position. However, following controversy about this selection, Lincoln wrote a letter revoking his offer to Cameron on January 3.

While he had revoked his offer for the position of secretary of the treasury from Simon Cameron, Lincoln did select Cameron to serve as his secretary of war. Cameron was a controversial selection because, while influential, he was also considered corrupt. His appointment was opposed within his own state of Pennsylvania by the party faction led by Governor-elect Andrew G. Curtin and party chairman A. K. McClure. Nonetheless, by Inauguration Day the competing factions realized that it was important to business interests that at least some Pennsylvanian be in Lincoln's cabinet, and Cameron was made secretary of war. Historian William Gienapp would express his belief that the final selection of Cameron for this soon-to-be-critical position was a clear indicator that Lincoln did not anticipate a civil war.

Montgomery Blair of Maryland, who was popular among anti-slavery and border state Democrats, was chosen to be postmaster general. He would be one of only two people coming from a border state to serve in Lincoln's Cabinet at any point during his presidency.

Lincoln tasked Vice President-elect Hamlin with finding someone from a New England state for the Cabinet. Hamlin recommended Gideon Welles of Connecticut, a former Democrat who had served in the Navy Department under President James K. Polk. Other influential Republicans concurred, and Welles became secretary of the navy.

For the position of secretary of the interior, Lincoln selected Caleb Blood Smith of Indiana, a former Whig representing the same type of Midwestern constituency as Lincoln. His critics faulted him for some of his railroad ventures, accused him of being a Doughface, and questioned his intellectual capacity for a high government position. In the end, Smith's selection for Secretary of the Interior had much to do with his campaign efforts on behalf of Lincoln and their friendship.

== Arrival in Washington, D.C. ==
On February 11, 1861, Lincoln boarded a special train that over the course of the next two weeks would take him to the nation's capital. Lincoln gave a particularly emotional farewell address upon leaving his hometown of Springfield, Illinois; he would never again return to Springfield alive. Lincoln spoke several times each day during the train trip, addressing crowds and legislatures across the North. While his speeches were mostly extemporaneous, his message was consistent: he had no hostile intentions towards the South, disunion was not acceptable, and he intended to enforce the laws and protect property.

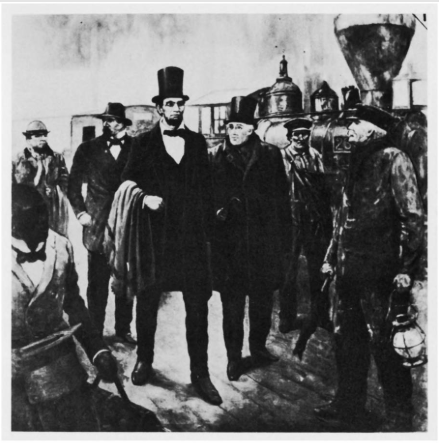
Lincoln arrives in Washington, D.C.

Rumors abounded during the course of the trip of various plots to kill Lincoln. Samuel Felton, president of the Philadelphia, Wilmington and Baltimore Railroad, hired detective Allan Pinkerton to investigate reports that secessionists might try to sabotage the railroad along the route. In conducting his investigation Pinkerton obtained information that indicated to him that an attempt on Lincoln's life would be made in Baltimore. As a result of the threat, the travel schedule was altered, tracks were closed to other traffic, and the telegraph wires even cut to heighten security. Lincoln and his entourage passed through Baltimore's downtown at around 3 o'clock in the morning of February 23, and, having evaded the plot, arrived safely in the nation's capital, which was placed under substantial military guard, a few hours later. The unannounced departure from the published schedule, along with the unconventional attire Lincoln wore to keep a low profile, led to critics and cartoonists accusing him of sneaking into Washington in disguise. Lincoln met with Buchanan and congressional leaders shortly after arriving in Washington. He also worked to complete his cabinet, meeting with Republican senators to obtain their feedback. His inauguration was held on March 4.
