= Political transition team =

Team to enable an orderly transfer of power

A political transition team is used when there is a change of political leadership, to enable an orderly and peaceful transfer of power.

== Canada ==
When a new Prime Minister, provincial premier or party leader is elected; a transition team is usually assembled.

When the Progressive Conservative Association of Alberta and the Wildrose Party merged, and Jason Kenney was elected leader of the new United Conservative Party, a transition team was formed to assist with administrative functions and formal party processes.

== United Kingdom ==
When Boris Johnson was elected Conservative leader and appointed prime minister in 2019, a transition team was formed to oversee political issues like Brexit.

== United States ==
In America, a transition team assures a safe transition of power. In America transitions take about 11 weeks.

== See also ==
- Power (social and political)
- Military transition team
