= First inauguration of Woodrow Wilson =

32nd United States presidential inauguration

First presidential inauguration of Woodrow Wilson
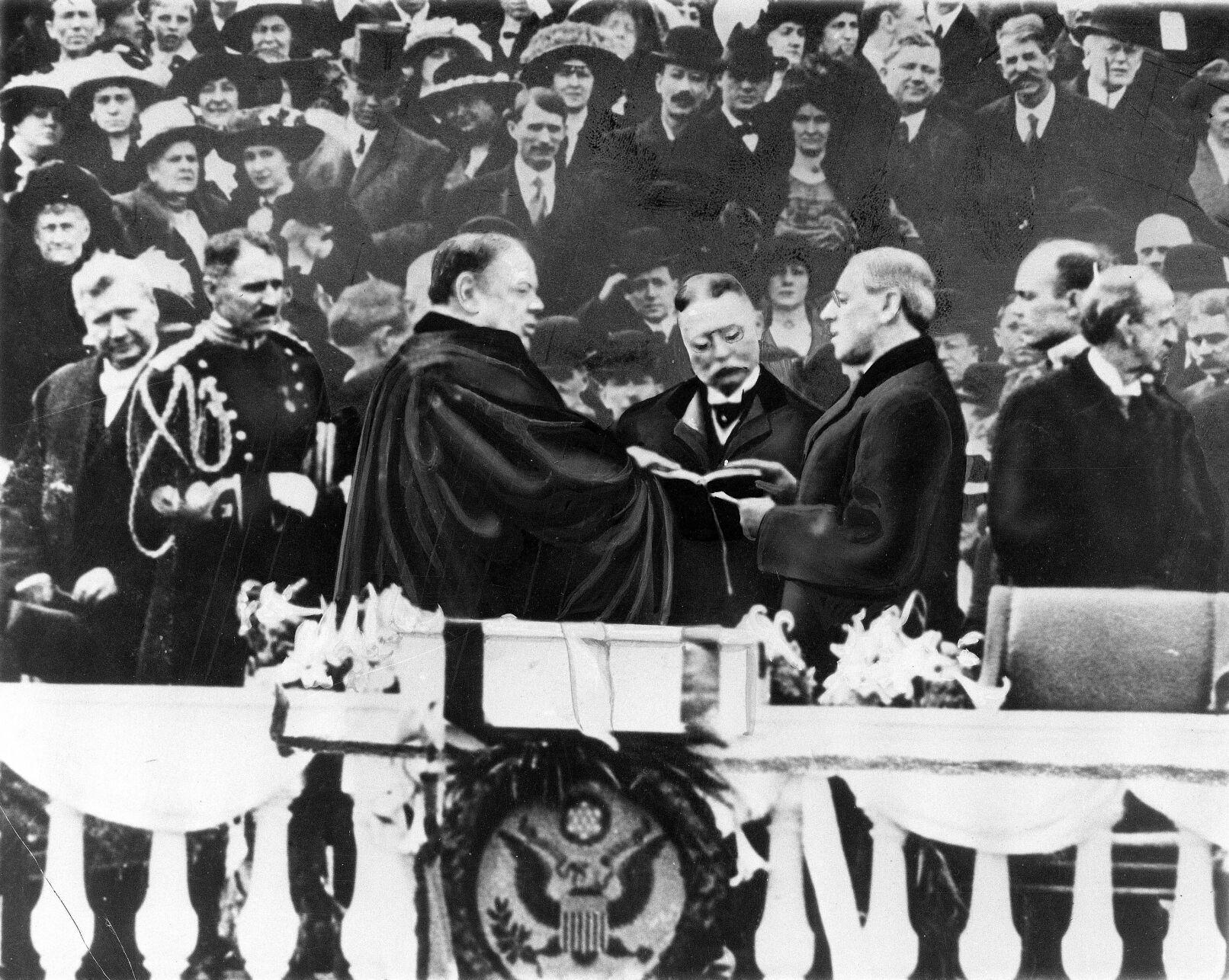
- Date: March 4, 1913; 113 years ago
- Location: United States Capitol, Washington, D.C.
- Organized by: Joint Congressional Committee on Inaugural Ceremonies
- Participants: Woodrow Wilson; 28th president of the United States — Assuming office Edward Douglass White; Chief Justice of the United States — Administering oath Thomas R. Marshall; 28th vice president of the United States — Assuming office Jacob Harold Gallinger; President pro tempore of the United States Senate — Administering oath

The first inauguration of Woodrow Wilson as the 28th president of the United States was held on Tuesday, March 4, 1913, at the East Portico of the United States Capitol in Washington, D.C. This was the 32nd inauguration and marked the commencement of the first four-year term of Woodrow Wilson as president and Thomas R. Marshall as vice president. Chief Justice Edward D. White administered the presidential oath of office to Wilson.

In his inaugural address, Wilson made clear his vision of the United States and its people as an exemplary moral force: "Nowhere else in the world have noble men and women exhibited in more striking forms the beauty and the energy of sympathy and helpfulness and counsel in their efforts to rectify wrong, alleviate suffering, and set the weak in the way of strength and hope". No inaugural balls were held to celebrate, as Wilson found them inappropriate for the occasion.

The day before his inauguration, Wilson expected crowds to meet him at the train station when he arrived in Washington. However, more people were watching the Woman Suffrage Procession organized by Alice Paul.

The event was filmed in Kinemacolor by the Kinemacolor Company of America.

== Gallery ==
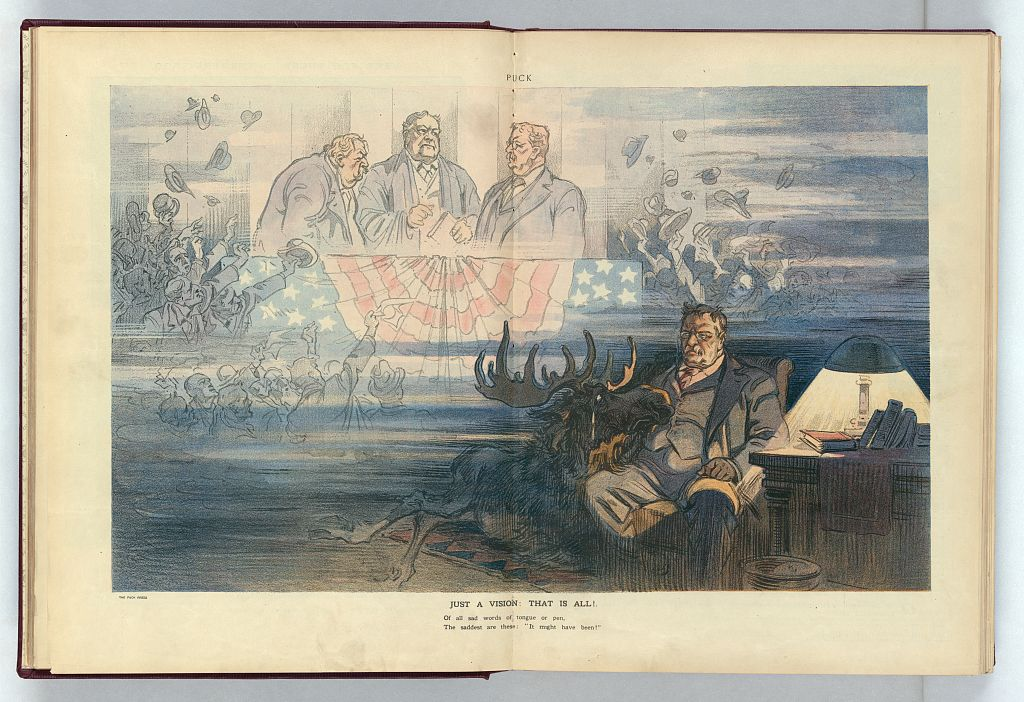
Illustration shows Theodore Roosevelt sitting in a chair with a bull moose who is crying and looking up at him; in the background the vision shows crowds cheering as Roosevelt is sworn in as president by Chief Justice Edward D. White, while an old and beaten William H. Taft looks on, the caption read "just a vision that's all!"

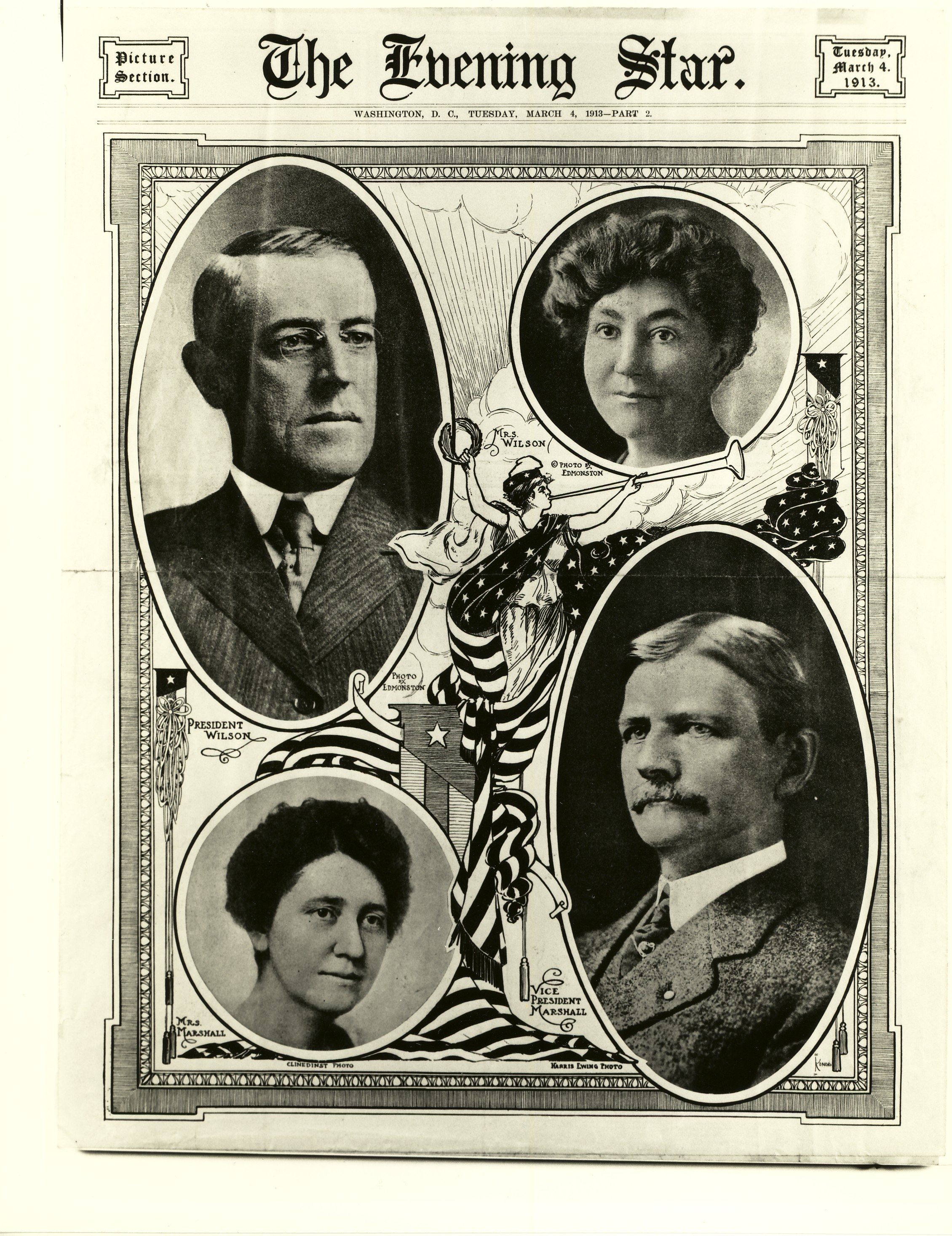
Front page of the Evening Star on inauguration day

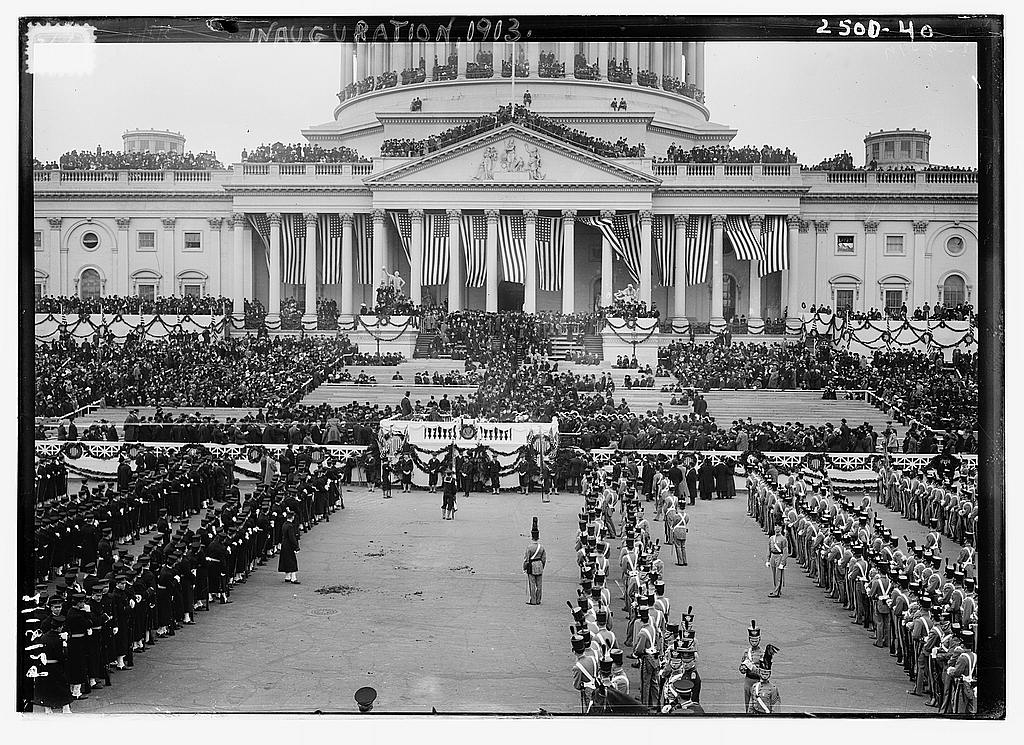
Inauguration day for the United States presidential election, 1912, Bain News Service

== See also ==
- Presidency of Woodrow Wilson
- Second inauguration of Woodrow Wilson
- 1912 United States presidential election
