= Presidential transition of Dwight D. Eisenhower =

Transfer of presidential power from Harry S. Truman to Dwight D. Eisenhower

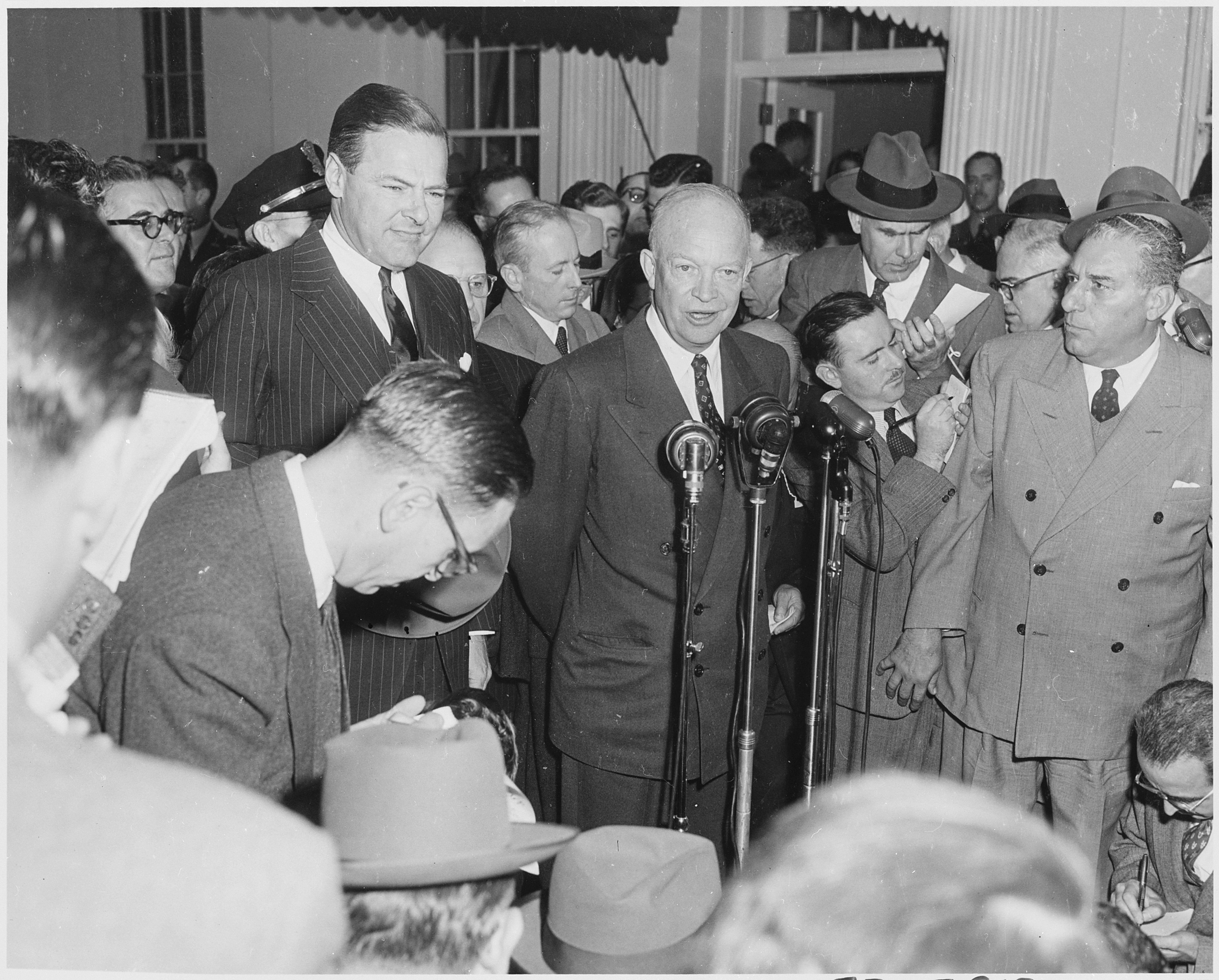
- President-elect Eisenhower speaks with reporters while visiting the White House on November 18, 1952
- Election date: November 4, 1952
- Inauguration date: January 20, 1953
- President-elect: Dwight D. Eisenhower (Republican)
- Vice president-elect: Richard Nixon (Republican)
- Outgoing president: Harry S. Truman (Democrat)
- Outgoing vice president: Alben W. Barkley (Democrat)
- Headquarters: Commodore Hotel, New York City
- Leaders of the transition: Herbert Brownell Jr. and Lucius D. Clay

The presidential transition of Dwight D. Eisenhower began when he won the 1952 United States presidential election, becoming the president-elect, and ended when Eisenhower was inaugurated on January 20, 1953.

The transition was the first United States presidential transition to employ a large-scale transition process, with Eisenhower's transition having a staff of more than 100 individuals.

The transition has been considered to have been a rough one, with much tension between the president-elect and the outgoing president, Harry S. Truman. Eisenhower and Truman had developed bitter feelings during the course of the 1952 election campaign, which lingered through the transition. Eisenhower and Truman only met once in person in the time between the election and the day of the inauguration. Eisenhower regarded the advice that Truman had attempted to provide him with as being of little value, and rejected an invitation for a second in-person meeting. Eisenhower also declined offers from Truman for him to be involved in the lame duck Truman administration's decision making during the transition period. There was mixed-success in coordination between the designated subordinates of the incoming Eisenhower administration and the outgoing subordinates of the Truman administration. After the election, Truman instructed White House staff and heads of government departments to prepare briefing documents for the incoming Eisenhower administration, and Eisenhower was the first president-elect to appoint liaison representatives for key federal agencies.

The transition took place amid active United States combat in the Korean War. Fulfilling a campaign promise to visit Korea if elected, two weeks after his election victory Eisenhower made a covert three-day visit to Korea.

== Background ==
A presidential transition was guaranteed to occur in 1952 when incumbent president Harry S. Truman declined to run for reelection. This would be the first post-election presidential transition to take place following the ratification of the Twentieth Amendment to the United States Constitution, which shortened the duration of such presidential transitions from four months to just over two months. This was also the first time there was a president-elect since the 1932 election.

== Pre-election preparations ==
=== Truman administration ===
After Truman's March 29, 1952 announcement that he would not be seeking an additional term, a number of people in the federal government began making considerations for the impending presidential transition. For instance, in the weeks following the announcement, numerous staffers in the Bureau of the Budget began circulating staff papers on the topic of transition. These papers addressed a number of factors, including the history of relations between outgoing and incoming presidents during transitions and the question of whether the outgoing or incoming president should be responsible for proposing a budget for the incoming president's inaugural years. The Bureau had workers begin creating materials that would be used to brief the incoming president and their associates on matters such as the federal budget system and current budget, the functions of the office of the presidency, and the significant organizational issues of the United States federal government.

Soon after Truman's announcement that he would not seek reelection, work on preparing for a transition began among the White House staff, with Truman granting approval for such preparations to be undertaken.

Truman had the Bureau of the Budget assumed the role of compiling briefing information for the next president. The bureau's various departments prepared an array briefing materials for the next president.

In addressing the question of whether Truman or the incoming president should submit the budget proposal for 1953, Truman and his associates decided that Truman would submit a budget, but would invite liaisons of the president-elect's team to have access to the Bureau of the Budget promptly after the election concluded.

Soon after Truman's announcement that he'd forgo seeking an additional term, a staff member of the United States Department of State was assigned to study the problem of relations between outgoing presidential administrations and incoming administrations. The resultant report identified several foreign policy and national security matters where the nation could be vulnerable, both during the election campaign and transition. It also analyzed top prospective candidates for the presidency on how they might approach continuity of foreign policy. It made the recommendation of providing both major party nominees with briefings on defense and foreign affairs during the election campaign, and providing even greater briefings for the president-elect during the transition. It also recommended placing representatives of the president-elect in the federal government's principal agencies. The report also suggested that the president could possibly invite the president-elect to offer their agreement on certain decisions, while also insisting that ultimate responsibility for decisions would continue to rest on outgoing presidents until they leave office. The report was compiled in a matter of weeks. It then received the endorsement of United States Secretary of State Dean Acheson, who forwarded it to the White House, where Truman read it. Truman was grateful for this report. Based upon an interview with Truman staffer Charles Burton Marshall that he conducted in July 1959, Laurin L. Henry observed that this report, "apparently coincided with President Truman's thinking and served as an important policy guide during the subsequent months.

Truman determined that his administration would provide briefings to both major party candidates. While both candidates would receive weekly reports from the CIA and occasional updates from the Department of State, the overall effort to brief the candidates was ultimately poorly managed, and largely unsuccessful. However, it did help to further cement the practice of administrations providing briefings to the campaigns of major candidates. The practice of a president providing opposition candidates with briefings had been begun by President Franklin D. Roosevelt during the 1944 presidential election, with Truman having continued it in the 1948 presidential election, with the presidents, in both instances, briefing their Republican opponent Thomas E. Dewey on certain matters.

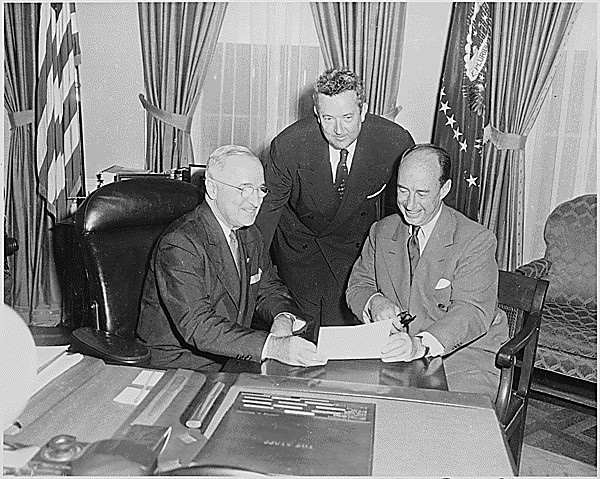
Democratic presidential and vice presidential nominees Adlai Stevenson II and John Sparkman meet with Truman in the Oval Office of the White House on August 12, 1952

In August, shortly after the Democratic National Convention, Truman invited newly-minted Democratic presidential nominee Adlai Stevenson II to meet with him at the White House for a briefing. The same offer was not extended to Eisenhower. Instead, Truman asked Chairman of the Joint Chiefs of Staff Omar N. Bradley to contact Eisenhower and provide him a general briefing, and to provide Eisenhower with regular intelligence reports after that. Bradley would misunderstand the urgency of Truman's request, and would fail to act on this before Truman's meeting with Stevenson. Truman's meeting with Stevenson would take place on August 12. The meeting was made known to the press, however, its purpose was not made clear, and, after the press speculated it would be focused on the role Truman would play in Stevenson's election campaign, Truman gave statements supporting this false narrative. Immediately before the meeting, the White House announced that Stevenson would be receiving a briefing during the meeting on defense and international affairs, though this announcement largely went unnoticed. For part of Stevenson's White House visit, he met in the Cabinet Room for a meeting with numerous administration officials, including as Secretary of State Dean Acheson, Chairman of the Joint Chiefs of Staff Omar N. Bradley, Director of Central Intelligence Walter Bedell Smith. The evening of the meeting, Eisenhower made a public statement lambasting the meeting, arguing that it demonstrated how Truman had hand-picked Stevenson to be his political successor, and criticizing the participation of figures such as Bradley and Smith it what was misunderstood to have been a campaign-focused meeting, arguing that their including indicated, "a decision to involve responsible nonpolitical officers of our Government...into a political campaign in which they have no part". Numerous Eisenhower backers echoed his grievances. The following day, Truman attempted to save face by extending Eisenhower a direct invitation to travel to Washington for a meeting with the Cabinet, briefing by the CIA, and the report on "the situation in the White House", which Eisenhower declined. Truman also informed Eisenhower that he and Stevenson were both to receive weekly reports by the CIA. Truman further attempted to save face, by publicly stating that arrangements had already been made much earlier to provide briefings to Eisenhower's camp, which Eisenhower's campaign denied. Soon, Bradley released a statement in which he took responsibility for his failure to have promptly carried out Truman's earlier orders to make arrangements with Eisenhower regarding briefings.

Upset that Eisenhower had declined his offer for a White House meeting, Truman sent him a hand-written letter on August 16 urging him to change his mind. Eisenhower replied three days later, still declining. It appears that this may have been the last instance in which Eisenhower and Truman would communicate with each other until after the election.

=== Eisenhower's pre-election planning ===
Herbert Brownell Jr. and Lucius D. Clay began planning aspects of Eisenhower's administration ahead of the election, compiling a list of recommended candidates for his Cabinet in the weeks before the election.

== Eisenhower's victory ==
After receiving a concession message from his Democratic opponent Adlai Stevenson, Eisenhower delivered his victory remarks at approximately 2pm Eastern Time on November 5, 1952 (the day after the 1952 election). Later that day, he would receive a congratulatory telegram from President Truman. Truman would, that afternoon, give a public statement to signal his acceptance of the election results as the will of the American voters, and urging Americans to lend their support to the president-elect, as well as making public a number of facets of the transition.

== Transition personnel and logistics ==
Eisenhower's transition was headed by Herbert Brownell Jr. and Lucius D. Clay.

Eisenhower's presidential transition was the first to employ a large-scale transition process. In his 1960 analysis of presidential transitions, Laurin L. Henry would write that its headquarters presented, "by far the most systematic staff activity ever at the disposal of a President-elect". The transition had roughly 120 staffers. The transition relied significantly on volunteer staffers.

Soon after Eisenhower's victory, Joseph Dodge and Henry Cabot Lodge Jr. were named as Eisenhower's liaisons to the Truman administration.

Brownell was Eisenhower's top advisor on strategy, organization, and personnel. Another of Eisenhower's top advisors was Sherman Adams, who would be placed in charge of shaping Eisenhower's White House staff. Other key figures in the transition included James Hagerty (its press secretary) and Arthur H. Vandenberg Jr. In early December, Sherman Adams named Roger Steffan to be an advance agent for Eisenhower at the White House.

Eisenhower centered his transition planning at the Commodore Hotel in New York City, which had been the location of his presidential campaign headquarters.

Eisenhower's transition effort was largely funded by the Republican National Committee, A number of wealthy designees Eisenhower had named for appointed office paid some expenses related to the transition on their own account.

In his congratulatory telegram to Eisenhower, Truman invited him to appoint a representative to the Bureau of the Budget, and offer which Eisenhower was quick to accept. The invitation was made public knowledge soon after it was issued, as Truman mentioned it in the public statement he gave on the afternoon after the election.

There had been some media speculation Vice President-elect Richard Nixon might be given a key role in the transition, as Eisenhower had promised during the campaign that Nixon would be an active member of his administration. However, Nixon was largely uninvolved in the transition.

For the first two weeks of his transition, Eisenhower stayed at a golf club in Augusta, Georgia, and conducted some of his transition work from there. While his two weeks in Georgia were partially a vacation, he continued to meet with transition staff (who would travel in from the transition's New York headquarters), and also met with important visitors, such as Thomas E. Dewey.

It was not until January 19 that Eisenhower formally resigned his position as president of Columbia University. Prior to resigning, he was on formal leave from the position. He and his family had continued to reside at his residence at the university during the transition.

== Relationship between Eisenhower and Truman ==
There had been some effort by Truman and Eisenhower to plan an easy transition, with recollection that the 1932–33 transition between Herbert Hoover and Franklin D. Roosevelt had been a difficult one. However, tensions between the two would ultimately make for a rough transition. Eisenhower and Truman had once had a working relationship together, having worked with one another at the close of World War II (when Eisenhower was a general and Truman was president), and had also worked together on the establishment of NATO. The 1952 election campaign, however, had harmed Truman's regard for Eisenhower. Truman thought poorly of how Eisenhower had failed to denounce Joseph McCarthy while campaigning. Eisenhower was unhappy with the political criticisms Truman had made against him during the campaign. Within days of the election, Truman would write in his diary of concerns that Eisenhower and his team were not cooperating in collaborating on an orderly transition, writing, "Ike and his advisers are afraid of some kind of trick. There are no tricks ... All I want is to make an orderly turnover. It has never been done."

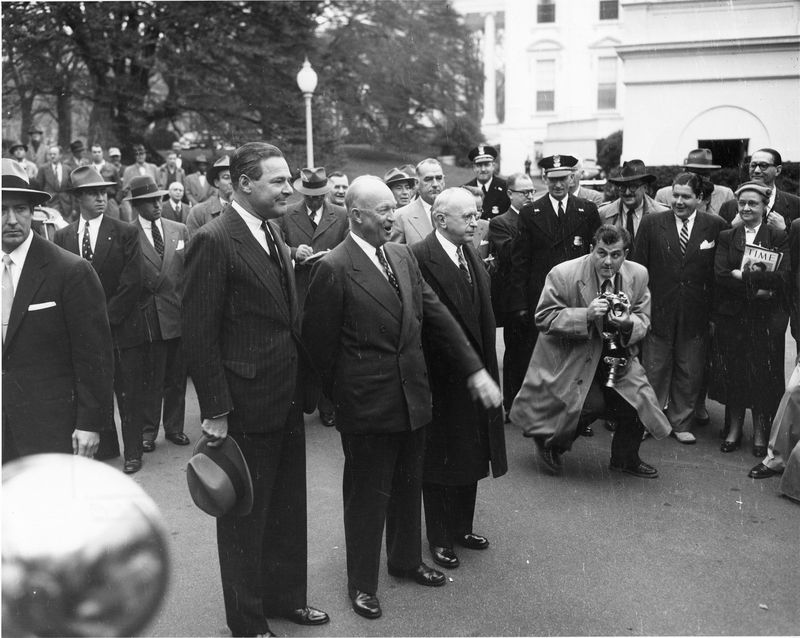
Eisenhower, flanked by Henry Cabot Lodge Jr. to his left and Joseph Dodge to his right, stands amid a crowd of police, photographers, and reporters during his November 18 visit to the White House

On November 18, Eisenhower and Truman met at the White House. Eisenhower was accompanied at this meeting by Joseph Dodge and Henry Cabot Lodge Jr. The visit saw them meet with Truman in his office before Truman brought them to the Cabinet Room to receive a briefing on the Korean War and foreign affairs from figures such as Secretary of State Dean Acheson. The November 18 meeting between Eisenhower and Truman would be the only meeting between the two before Eisenhower's inauguration. While Truman attempted to provide advice to Eisenhower, Eisenhower did not believe he had gained much from the meeting. Eisenhower later ignored an invite from Truman to attend a pre-Christmas lunch at the White House.

There were reports that Truman was offering for Eisenhower to play a role in decision making during the lame duck period, but that Eisenhower declined to do so. Interestingly, per the recounting of individuals involved in it, during the closing days of the presidential transition of John F. Kennedy, Eisenhower would extend a similar offer to Kennedy, which Kennedy would similarly decline.

Tensions between Eisenhower and Truman lasted through Eisenhower's inauguration. Clark Clifford would later remark, "The hatred between the two men that day was like a monsoon". Ahead of meeting with the outgoing president on the day of the inauguration, Eisenhower expressed, to associates, his displeasure at the prospect of interacting with Truman. When Eisenhower and his wife Mamie arrived at the White House to pick up the president for a car ride to the United States Capitol, they refused to join Truman and his wife Bess for coffee in the White House, and opted not to even leave the car until Truman left the White House. This was seen as a slight, with CBS correspondent Eric Sevareid later writing, "it was a shocking moment." Each presidents' later accounts in their memoirs would differ on some of the conversation they had in their car ride to the Capitol Building, however, both acknowledged that Eisenhower had inquired to Truman as to who had ordered his son John to return from service in the Korean War to attend the inauguration. Truman admitted that he had personally done so, believing it only right that Eisenhower's son should be able to attend Eisenhower's inauguration.

== Selection of appointees ==
On November 20, Eisenhower began designating the first of his choices for his Cabinet. He would finish naming his Cabinet designees on December 1. This relatively quick, earlier and faster than the following three presidents-elect would do so. The quick pace was attributable to Eisenhower setting the objective of naming designees to the top posts prior to his trip to Korea.

Advisors Brownell and Clay were joined by Thomas E. Coleman on a three-man committee tasked with looking at prospects for top positions in Eisenhower's administration. Eisenhower had asked the three of them on the night of the election to serve this role. The existence of this committee was not publicly known, which meant that it was spared from receiving outside pressure. Sherman Adams provided them with staff assistance. Eisenhower involved himself in this selection of top personnel, even personally select some staff members. While given the scope of screening candidates for top positions in the administration, the committee would also outline some prospective candidates for lesser positions.

Two-time Republican presidential nominee Thomas E. Dewey, considered the leader of the party's moderate wing, opted to remove himself from consideration for a position in Eisenhower's administration. He would be consulted about several prospective appointees during the selection process.

Robert A. Taft, an influential leading figure in the Republican Party's conservative wing (being considered the head of the conservative coalition), expressed his dissatisfaction with a number of aspects of Eisenhower's formation of his administration. While he had been consulted by Brownell via telephone on a number of prospects, very few of the individuals that Taft had expressed preference for were chosen. Taft was also unhappy that Eisenhower disregarded the past practice of presidents-elect providing U.S. senators of their party with the courtesy of being consulted about potentially appointees hailing from the states they represented. Taft also complained of the, "indecent haste with which Eisenhower supporters appear to be demanding and obtaining jobs". Taft also criticized some selections, expressing very strong opposition to the selection of Martin Patrick Durkin for secretary of labor.

Not all designees were announced immediately after they were selected. For instance, the selection of Herbert Brownell Jr. as attorney general was not announced until two weeks after Brownell had accepted Eisenhower's offer of that position.

A very key selection would be assistant to the president, as, Eisenhower, intended on to implement a military-style chain of command structure in his White House, with the role acting as his chief of staff. Eisenhower opted to not choose an individual hailing from the military command for this role, as he believed that the selection of an individual that had served as a military officer for such a central role in his White House would, "create in many circles a suspicion of excessive military influence". Before choosing Herbert Brownell Jr. as attorney general, Eisenhower had actually offered him this position, but Brownell declined, signaling his desire instead for a law-related position. Eisenhower's offering of Brownell this position on the day of the election is believed to have marked the first job offer Eisenhower had given for anyone to serve in his administration, perhaps highlighting just how much he prioritized this selection. Eisenhower then considered Sherman Adams and Henry Cabot Lodge Jr. for the role. With Lodge indicating his strong preference to serve as United States ambassador to the United Nations, Eisenhower placed Adams as his assistant to the president.

While Eisenhower had desired to have a female member of his Cabinet, none of his cabinet selections would be female. Many top appointees in Eisenhower's administration came from the business community.

In the week ahead of the inauguration, Cabinet designees appeared before Senate committees, which were holding hearings in preparation for the formal nominations of these designees once Eisenhower took office. Committees of the United States Senate would, the day before the inauguration, finish voicing their approval for all Eisenhower's designees for Cabinet members except Charles Erwin Wilson (a choice that was facing some resistance), positioning them all to be confirmed and sworn-in soon after Eisenhower took office.

=== Defense and foreign policy ===
- Charles Erwin Wilson, secretary of defense (announced November 20, 1952)
- John Foster Dulles, secretary of state (announced November 20, 1952)
- Henry Cabot Lodge Jr., United States ambassador to the United Nations (announced November 29, 1952)
- Harold E. Talbott, secretary of the Air Force (announced December 19, 1952)
- Robert T. Stevens, secretary of the Army (announced December 19, 1952)
- Robert B. Anderson, secretary of the Navy (announced December 19, 1952)
- Roger M. Kyes, deputy secretary of Defense (announced December 19, 1952)
- Harold E. Stassen, director of the Mutual Security Agency (announced November 21, 1952)
- Oveta Culp Hobby, administrator of the Federal Security Agency (announced November 25, 1952)
- Vannevar Bush, head of special commission to study the reorganization of the Department of Defense
- Winthrop W. Aldrich, United States Ambassador to the United Kingdom
- Mary Pillsbury Lord, United States representative on the United Nations Commission on Human Rights

=== Domestic policy ===
- Ezra Taft Benson, secretary of agriculture (announced November 24, 1952)
- Arthur Summerfield, postmaster general (announced November 25, 1952)
- Herbert Brownell Jr., attorney general (announced November 21, 1952)
- Douglas McKay, secretary of the interior (announced November 20, 1952)
- William P. Rogers, deputy attorney general (announced January 4, 1953)
- Joseph Dodge, director of the Bureau of the Budget (announced January 3, 1953)
- Warren E. Burger, assistant attorney general for the Civil Division (announced January 4, 1953)
- Warren Olney III, assistant attorney general for the Criminal Division (announced January 4, 1953)
- J. Lee Rankin, assistant attorney general for the Executive Adjudications Division (announced January 4, 1953)

=== Economic policy ===
- Sinclair Weeks, secretary of commerce (announced December 1, 1952)
- Martin Patrick Durkin, secretary of labor (announced December 1, 1952)
- George M. Humphrey, secretary of the Treasury (announced November 21, 1952)
- Arthur F. Burns, chairman of the Council of Economic Advisers
- W. Walter Williams, under secretary of commerce (announced December 19, 1952)
- Marion B. Folsom, under secretary of the Treasury
- Samuel W. Anderson, assistant secretary of commerce for international affairs (announced December 19, 1952)
- Warren Randolph Burgess, consultant and special deputy secretary of the Treasury
- Ivy Baker Priest, treasurer of the United States
- H. Chapman Rose, assistant secretary of the treasury

=== White House staff ===
- Sherman Adams, assistant to the president (announced November 24, 1952)
- Wilton Persons, special assistant to the president (announced November 29, 1952)
- James Hagerty, White House press secretary
- Thomas E. Stephens, White House appointments secretary (originally announced November 29, 1952 as designee for "special counsel to the president"; subsequently, reassigned to this position)
- Arthur H. Vandenberg Jr., White House appointments secretary (announced November 29, 1952; subsequently withdrew)
- Bernard M. Shanley, White House counsel
- Murray Snyder, assistant White House press secretary (announced January 18, 1953)
- Gabriel Hauge, White House administrative assistant
- Emmet John Hughes, White House administrative assistant

=== Other ===
- Milton S. Eisenhower, member of the Advisory Committee on Government Organization
- Arthur Sherwood Flemming, member of the Advisory Committee on Government Organization
- Nelson Rockefeller, member of the Advisory Committee on Government Organization

== Key activities of Eisenhower ==
=== Trip to Korea ===
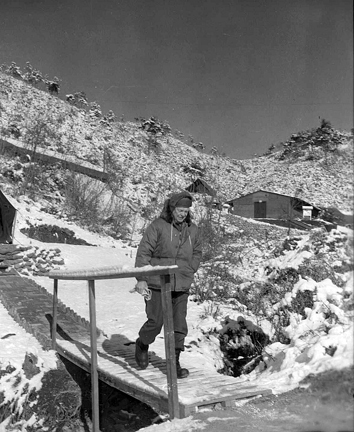
Eisenhower tours installations at the headquarters of the 2nd Infantry Division on December 4, 1952, during his tour of the Korean battlefront

Eisenhower had made a campaign promise to make a trip to Korea if elected. Truman regarded Eisenhower's proposed trip to have been an act of demagoguery. Nevertheless, Truman had, in his post-election congratulatory telegram to Eisenhower, extended him an offer to use his plane, The Independence, for such a trip if he had desired to.

Early on November 29, Eisenhower departed from New York on the military plane. Accompanying Eisenhower were many military and political advisors, including Herbert Brownell Jr., James Hagerty, Paul T. Carroll, as well as Charles Erwin Wilson (Eisenhower's designee for secretary of defense) and Chairman of the Joint Chiefs of Staff Omar N. Bradley. Joining them after they had already made it part-way to Korea was Arthur W. Radford, the Navy commander of the Pacific. They arrived in Seoul on December 3.

Eisenhower stayed in Korea for three days. He received a number of briefings on his visit. He visited troops, even seeing his son John. He met with American and Korean officials there. Just before departing, he met with the press and read a press statement to them.

Security was tight on Eisenhower's visit. Additionally, the first dispatches about Eisenhower's trip were not released until after he had already departed from Korea. During the trip, announcements of appointments, as well as false announcements of meetings Eisenhower was supposedly having in New York, were released to mislead the public into believing that Eisenhower was still in New York City. Some of the press were in on helping with this deception.

=== Meetings with advisors aboard the USS Helena ===
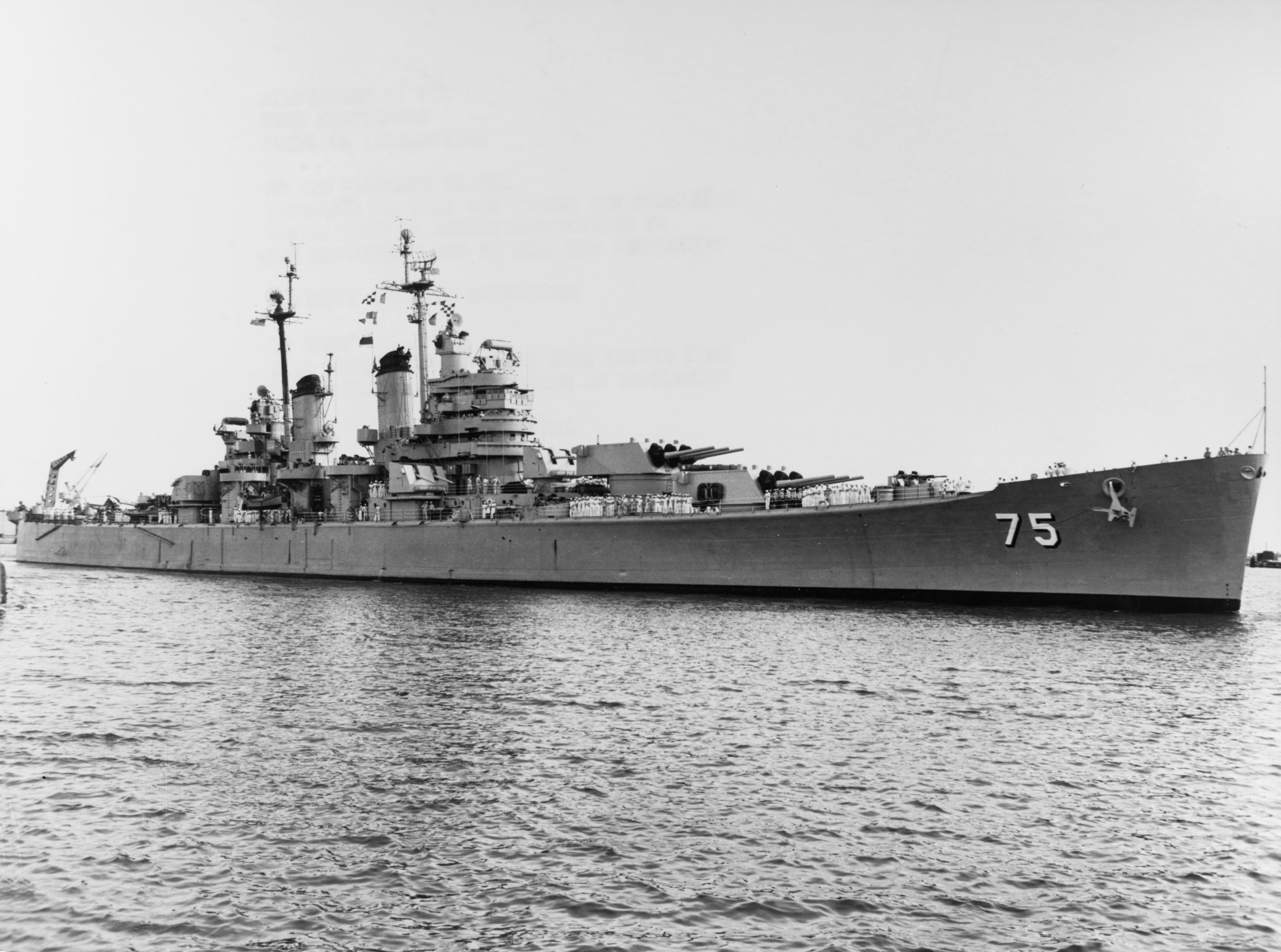
USS Helena at Apra Harbor in Guam during Eisenhower's trip

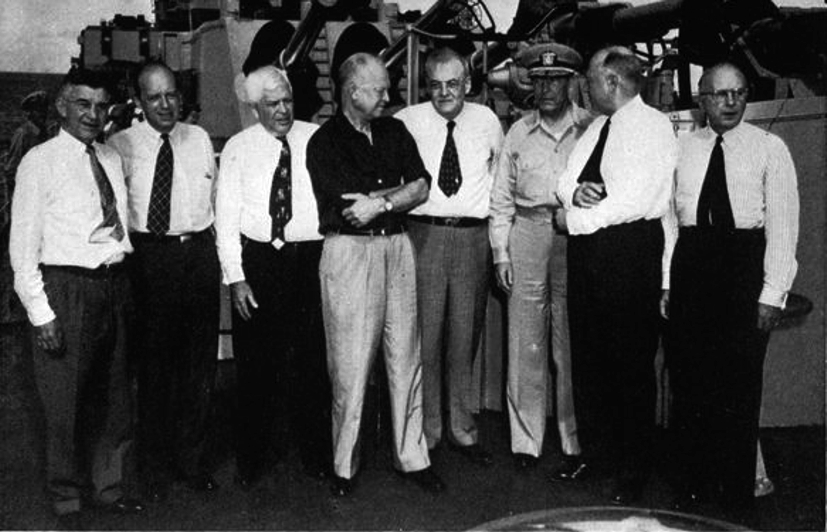
Eisenhower with members of his future Cabinet on the USS Helena

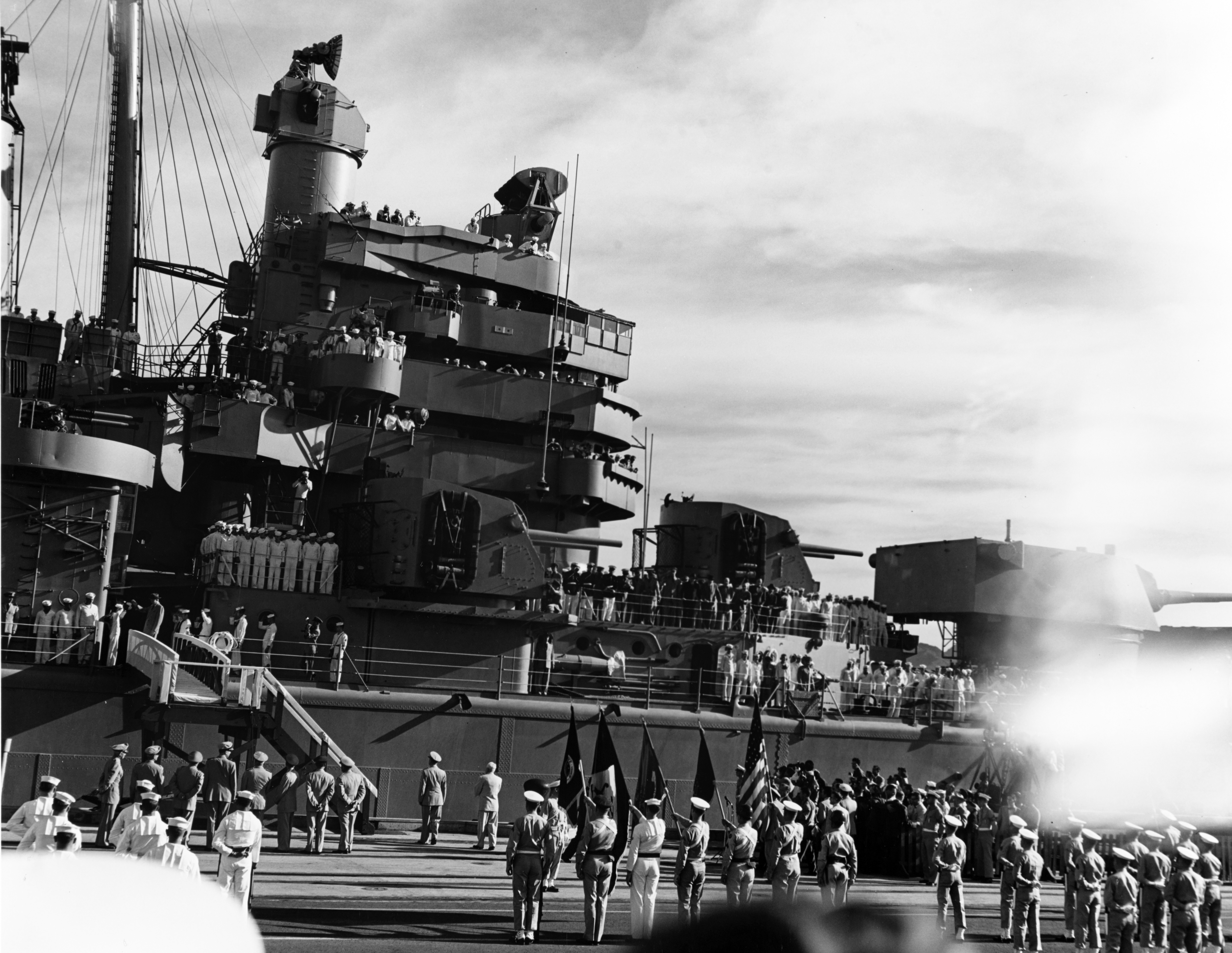
Eisenhower disembarking from the USS Helena at Pearl Harbor on 11 December 1952

Eisenhower did not return directly to New York from Korea. He first flew to Guam, where he boarded the USS Helena, on which they traveled to Pearl Harbor in Hawaii. The trip between Guam and Hawaii lasted three days, and Eisenhower and top advisors (including many that had not been on the Korea trip, but had traveled out to join Eisenhower on the ship) held many meetings about topics such as appointments to remaining positions in his administration, shaping the national budget, and wage and price controls. Among those on the ship were secretary-designates John Foster Dulles, George M. Humphrey, and Douglas McKay, as well as Eisenhower's budget representative Joseph Dodge, Lucius Clay, Emmet John Hughes, and Charles Douglas Jackson.

The USS Helena arrived at Pearl Harbor on December 11. Once in Hawaii, Eisenhower spent some time resting. He also held a meeting with Arthur W. Radford, who had, after the Korean trip group arrived in Guam, flown directly to Pearl Harbor instead of joining Eisenhower aboard the USS Helena. By this time, Charles Wilson was urging Eisenhower to select Radford as his chairman of the joint chief of staffs.

Eisenhower left Hawaii on December 13, arriving at New York City's LaGuardia Field the following afternoon.

=== Meetings with Douglas MacArthur and Herbert Hoover ===
During Eisenhower's trip, Douglas MacArthur happened to have delivered a speech in which he claimed to have a plan to end the war that he would be willing to share with the president-elect. While Eisenhower disliked MacArthur, and some of his advisorson the USS Helena saw little reason for him to meet with MacArthur, other Eisenhower's advisors aboard the USS Helena advised him that he should meet with MacArthur, who was widely admired among the American public. Gallup opinion polling conducted roughly around this time showed MacArthur to be the second-most admired living figure among Americans, with only Eisenhower being more admired. Thus, a meeting with MacArthur would be good politics. Eisenhower contacted MacArthur after his trip to arrange a meeting. On December 9, Eisenhower's press secretary, James Hagerty, released to reporters some brief messages that Eisenhower and MacArthur had exchanged. This angered Truman, with this furthering his belief that Eisenhower was playing demagoguery with Korea. Truman publicly challenged, "if anyone has a reasonable plan for ending the Korean fighting in an honorable way, in a way that will not lead directly to a great wore, that plan should be presented at once to the President." Soon after Eisenhower returned to New York, he and Dulles met with MacArthur at Dulles' personal residence.

In December, Eisenhower met with former president Herbert Hoover, who Eisenhower greatly admired. They discussed the topic of government reorganization.

=== Meetings with foreign dignitaries ===
During the transition, Eisenhower met with some foreign dignitaries. In November, Eisenhower met with Anthony Eden, the deputy prime minister of the United Kingdom and indicated to him that, unlike Truman, he was against seeing the United Kingdom make an immediate entrance into the pending European Defense Community. Eisenhower met with Prime Minister of New Zealand Sidney Holland on December 16, and discussed the possibility of forming a pacific-focused defense alliance similar to NATO. On January 5, Eisenhower had two meetings with Prime Minister of the United Kingdom Winston Churchill during a visit by Churchill to the United States. Other foreign dignitaries that Eisenhower met with included ones from Brazil, Mexico, and India.

=== Implicit support for Robert A. Taft as Senate Majority Leader ===
In December, in order to avoid a rift with the conservative wing of the Republican Party, which was largely led by Robert A. Taft, Eisenhower had Frank Carlson, one of this top United States Senate allies, endorse the candidacy of Taft for Senate majority leader, which was perceived as an implicit endorsement from Eisenhower.

=== January 12–13 meetings at the Commodore Hotel ===
January 12 through 13, Eisenhower, in an unprecedented move, assembled all of the designated key members of his administration for meetings at the Commodore Hotel. This included Vice President-elect Nixon and designees for department heads, independent agency heads, and key White House and Executive Office staffers. During the meeting, Eisenhower recited and asked for input on the draft of his inaugural address. Members of the inaugural committee briefed the group on the schedule for inauguration day. The group went over various matters including the national budget.

After the January 12–13 meeting at the Commodore Hotel, many department heads traveled to Washington, D.C., where they reviewed briefing materials, consulted with outgoing officials, and looked at prospective appointments they had the authority to make. Cabinet members also had Senate hearings regarding their nominations to attend.

=== Eisenhower's final days before inauguration ===
Eisenhower and his family traveled from New York City to Washington, D.C., on a special train on the evening of January 18. Once in Washington, D.C., they stayed at the Hotel Statler. Eisenhower then awaited his inauguration quietly, holding only a few meetings with aides.

== Transition in federal departments and agencies ==
Shortly after the election, Truman instructed White House staff and heads of federal government departments to begin preparing their own briefing documents for the incoming administration.

Ahead of the first post-election meeting between Eisenhower and Truman, held November 18, Eisenhower named liaison representatives for key federal agencies, something no previous president-elect had done before during their a presidential transition.

The effectiveness of transition operations would vary between federal agencies.

=== Bureau of the Budget ===
Joseph Dodge acted as the liaison to the Bureau of the Budget, and saw great cooperation and transparency from the bureau's personnel. Dodge also arranged for most Cabinet designees to visit the Bureau of the Budget to meet its top staff members and receive a briefing on budget-related matters.

=== Department of Defense ===
Liaison between the designees for the United States Department of Defense and their outgoing predecessors was lackluster. Eisenhower's designee for secretary of defense, Charles Erwin Wilson, met with his outgoing predecessor, Robert A. Lovett, he only did so cursorily. After Eisenhower designated Charles Erwin Wilson to be his secretary of defense, Lovett extended an invitation for Wilson to accompany him to the next month's NATO conference in Paris, France. Wilson did not accept this invitation. In addition, Eisenhower's designee for deputy secretary of defense, Roger Kyes, disregarded the advice of his outgoing predecessor, William Chapman Foster. During the transition, Kyes worked from a hotel room in Washington, D.C. They would have incumbent assistant secretaries and other incumbent personnel meet with them there, where they would assess them to inform whether to retain them or not. They did keep a number of incumbents, they dismissed some who historian Carl M. Brauer would later argue that they should have retained. Brauer would write, "the Defense Department and its predecessor, the War Department, had a shortage of high-ranking civilian officials, so Wilson and Kyes were inadvertently placing themselves even more at the mercy of the many military officers whose first loyalty lay with their individual services, not with the department".

While Dulles was able to select Kyes to be his deputy secretary, the secretaries of the service branches were chosen by Eisenhower in consort with his advisors Brownell and Clay, though he did give Wilson the right to veto any of the selections for these positions.

Incumbents at the Department of Defense prepared briefing books for their successors, but not all of these proved useful. Eisenhower's appointees were also given reports by outside sources. One such example are reports created by McKinsey and Company under the supervision of John Corson. These reports had been commissioned by then-businessman Harold E. Talbott in May 1952, and provided incoming appointees with information about the subordinate positions they had the authority to fill.

Wilson had visited The Pentagon shortly before traveling with Eisenhower to Korea. He returned to The Pentagon on December 23, accompanied by Eisenhower's designated secretaries for branches of the armed forces (Robert B. Anderson, Roger M. Kyes, Robert T. Stevens, Harold E. Talbott). They all had a group lunch with their counterparts, before each separately joined their counterparts for a tour. They were also briefed by the Joint Chiefs of Staff.

=== Department of Justice ===
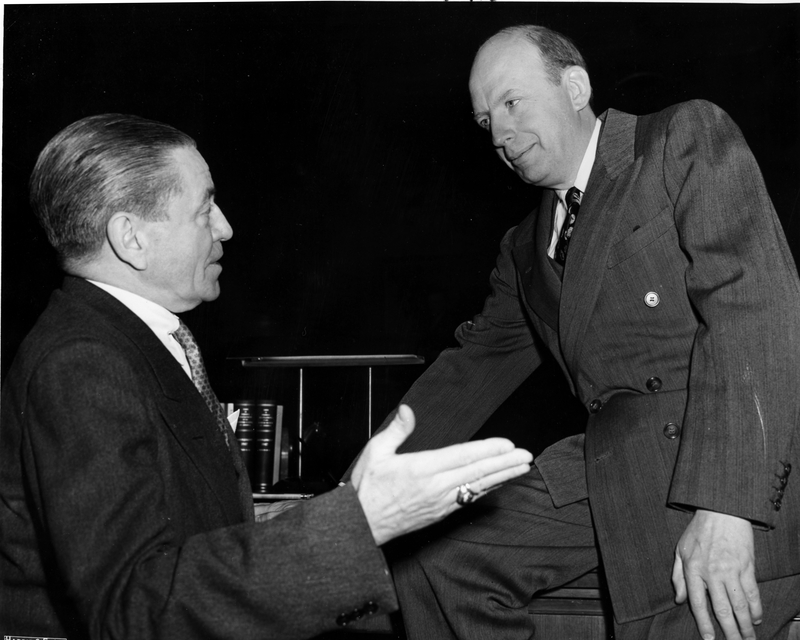
Outgoing attorney general James P. McGranery (left) briefs Eisenhower's designee for the position, Herbert Brownell Jr., on the workings of the Department of Justice on December 20, 1952

On December 20, Eisenhower's designee for attorney general, Herbert Brownell Jr., went to the Department of Justice headquarters and met with the outgoing officeholder, James P. McGranery. He was given a tour of the building, given a briefing on matters that were pending before the department, and recommendations about how to organize the department. It was agreed that William P. Rogers would serve as Brownell's liaison to the Department, and would be granted use of the department's facilities during the transition. The two also met with the press, and spoke complimentarily of one another.

=== Department of State ===
The Department of State had mixed success with its transition. Eisenhower's designee for United States secretary of state, John Foster Dulles, was acquainted with many top of the incumbent State Department personnel, including outgoing secretary of state Dean Acheson, so there was strong trust and cooperation between him and the outgoing administration's team. Dulles consulted with many incumbent officials of the State Department. He solicited the views Achenson and his deputy, David K. E. Bruce, on many prospective appointees for positions in the department. He even would have Bruce remain in his job for several weeks after the inauguration, in order to assist him in getting acquainted to his job. On the other hand, Dulles would be overly focused on policy to the great expense of the administrative aspects. Dulles was only given partial say over the selection of top officials at the department, with Eisenhower practicing his own discretion in the selection of individuals for these roles. In advising him in his role of selecting top State Department figures, Dulles arranged a small assembly of retired Foreign Service officers to provide him recommendations. However, these formers officers proved to have been retired and distanced from Foreign Services for too long for their advice to be very useful. This was most extremely exemplified by the fact that two individuals that they recommended to Dulles had were actually already dead.

=== Department of the Treasury ===
There was successful cooperation between the incoming team and the incumbent personnel at the Department of the Treasury. Eisenhower's Secretary of the treasury designee George M. Humphrey had been granted full liberty to select his own top subordinates, and had move quickly to name businessmen and lawyers with familiarity with Washington politics and the matters of the Treasury Department to these positions. By early December, designees for these top subordinate positions had been named, and were in Washington, D.C. preparing for their assumption of office. There was a high level of trust and mutually strong regard between the incoming team and John Wesley Snyder, the outgoing secretary of the treasury.

== Transition of White House staff ==
Sherman Adams, Eisenhower's pick for assistant to the president (chief of staff) spent some time at the White House at the invitation of outgoing assistant to the president John R. Steelman. Steelman worked with Adams' liaison Roger Steffan to hammer-out many of the procedural aspects of the transition, including the handling of files, security arrangements, plans for how to reorganize the clerical staff in order to make space for the secretaries being brought in by Eisenhower. John R. Steelman also agreed to work for the Eisenhower administration as a deputy consultant for the first several weeks of Eisenhower's presidency. Truman had allotted money in the executive budget for redecorating. Steelman even permitted Adams and his assistant for operations Roger Steffan to initiate alterations to the layout of the offices, until Truman discovered carpentry work at the White House and objected to such changes being made before his departure from office. Ahead of the inauguration, repainting was done and new furniture was acquired. Additionally, offices in the White House, for the first time, were given numbers in order to help the incoming staff navigate, and nameplates of key members of Eisenhower's staff were affixed to their future offices.

Eisenhower's incoming White House staff generally exhibited little interest in learning much from their outgoing counterparts.

== Other actions of the Truman administration ==
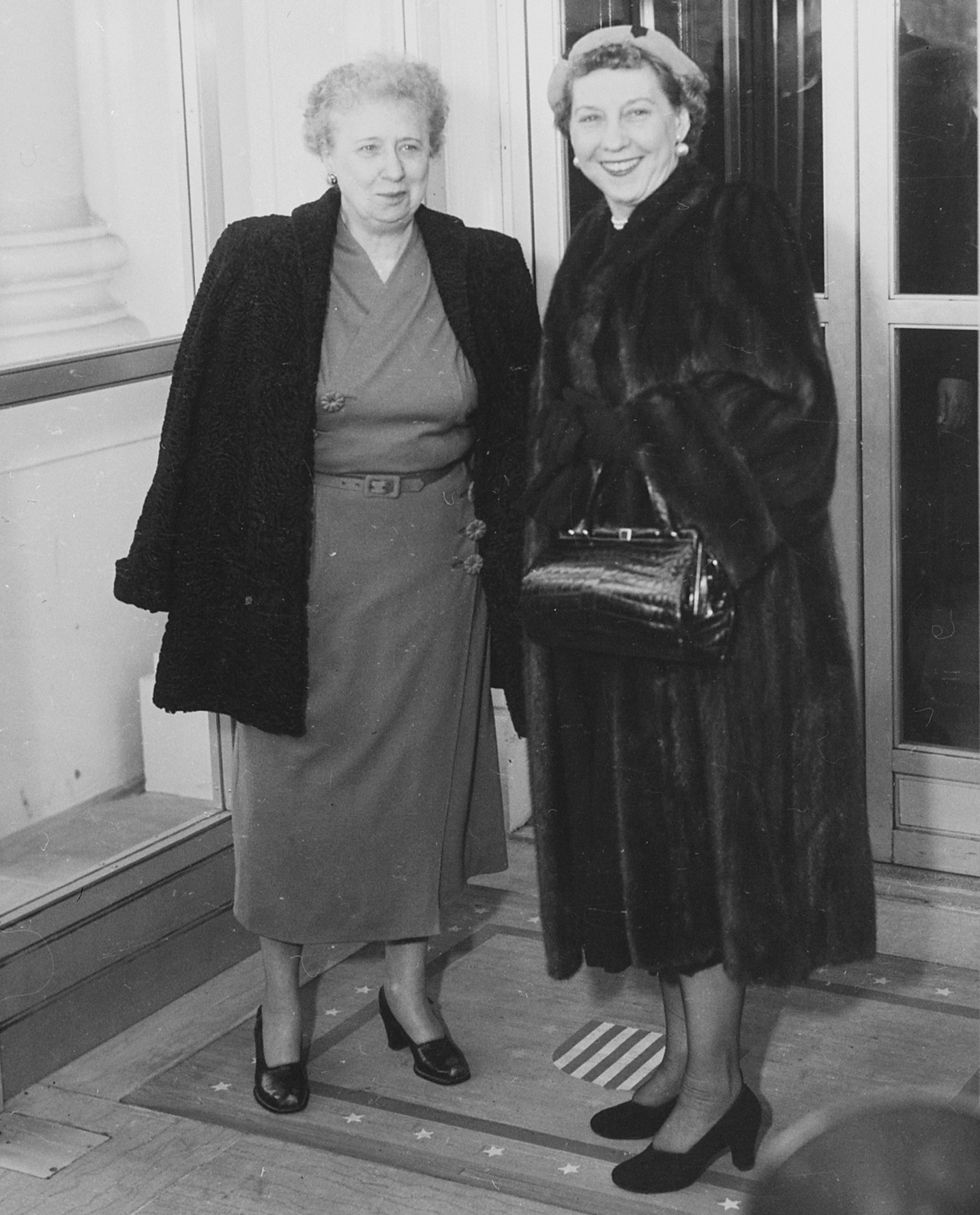
Bess Truman (left) giving Mamie Eisenhower a tour of the White House on December 1, 1952

Truman was reported to have asked defense mobilizer Joe Fowler to remain in his position until Eisenhower's inauguration in order to stop the mobilization program from stalling during the transition. On December 1, Truman's wife Bess gave a tour of the White House to Eisenhower's wife Mamie. On January 15, Truman delivered his farewell address. It was broadcast over radio and television.

In his public statement on the afternoon following the election, Truman stated that, per the requirements of the law, he would submit a budget proposal of his own. Eisenhower's budget director, Joseph Dodge, observed the budget office's preparation of the 1953 budget. Eisenhower would, after taking office, revise Truman's budget.

== Historical assessment of the transition ==
The transition has been regarded as uneasy due to the tension and lack of coordination between the president-elect and the outgoing president.

Eisenhower employed a much more substantial transition operation than past presidents, with Richard Skinner regarding it as the "first modern presidential transition" in a 2016 article for Vox.

In 1987, historian Carl M. Brauer wrote that one of the mistakes Eisenhower made during his transition had been not developing a substantial legislative agenda, arguing that, "without a presidentially backed program to keep it busy, Congress found it much easier in 1953 to get into controversial, negative, or largely symbolic issues in which the Eisenhower administration often found itself in holding actions, trying to prevent a weakening of the presidency or a repudiation of existing foreign policies." Brauer further argued that, "his inaction gave right-wing forces in Congress far too much leeway to pursue their own agenda. Under the circumstances, almost any Presidential program would have been better than none."
