= Vice President–elect of the United States =

Elected candidate for vice president of the U.S. in the time before inauguration

Vice President-elect of the United States
- Incumbent; Vacant since January 20, 2025
- Style: The Honorable
- Term length: In the period between the general election on Election Day in November and Noon (Eastern Standard Time) on Inauguration Day (January 20)
- Inaugural holder: John Adams; January 10 – April 21, 1789
- Formation: No official formation
- Salary: None

The vice president-elect of the United States is the candidate who has been elected to the office of vice president of the United States in a United States presidential election, but is awaiting inauguration to assume office.

There is no explicit indication in the U.S. Constitution as to when that person actually becomes vice president-elect, although the Twentieth Amendment uses the term "vice president-elect", thus giving the term constitutional justification.

The term corresponds to the term "president-elect of the United States", used for those elected president of the United States for the same period between their election and inauguration.

Incumbent vice presidents, who have won re-election for a second term, are generally not referred to as the vice president-elect, as they are already in office and are to become the vice president.

== Elections of vice presidents-elect ==
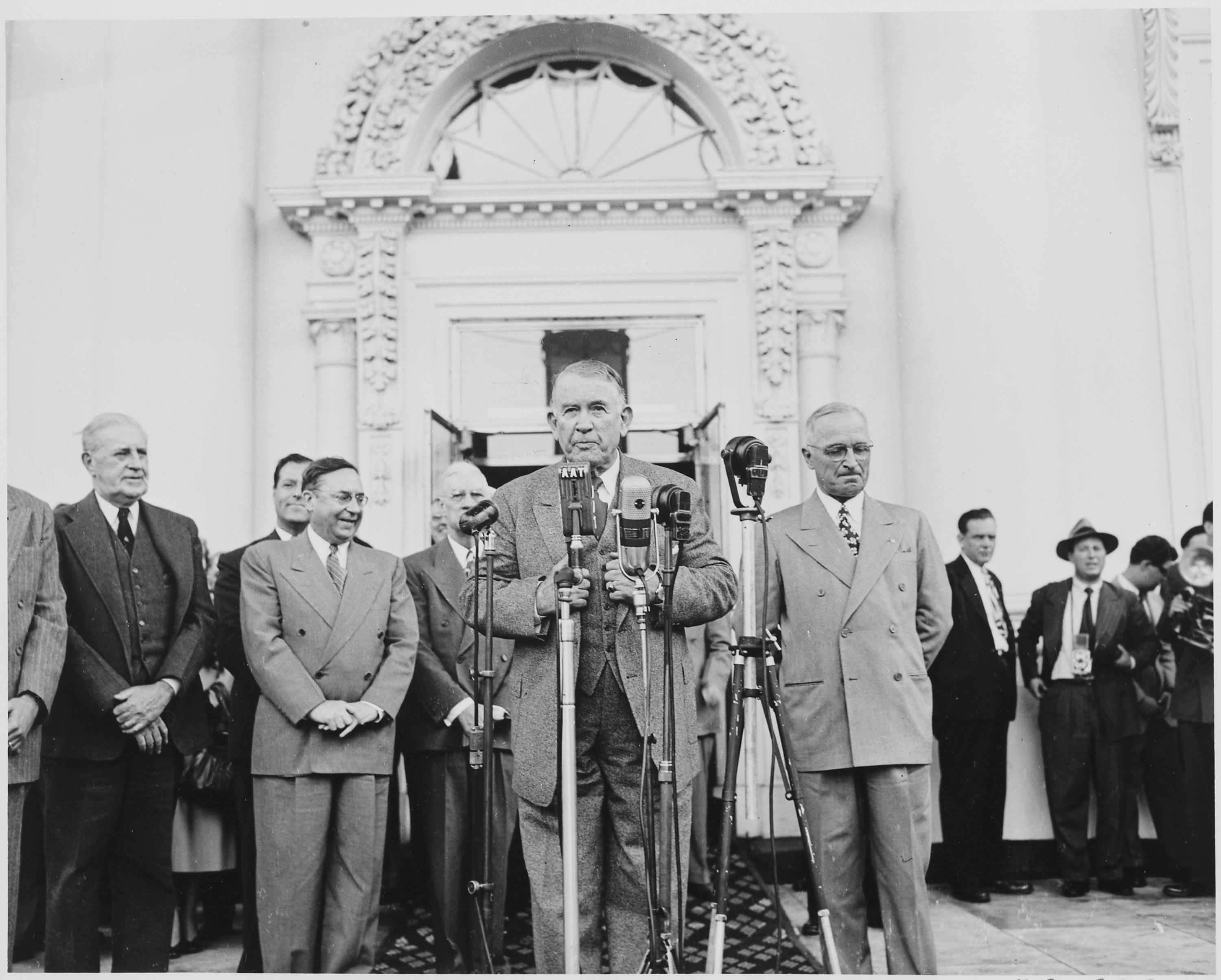
Vice President-elect Alben W. Barkley speaks at the White House on November 5, 1948. Barkley had been elected on a ticket alongside incumbent-president Harry S. Truman

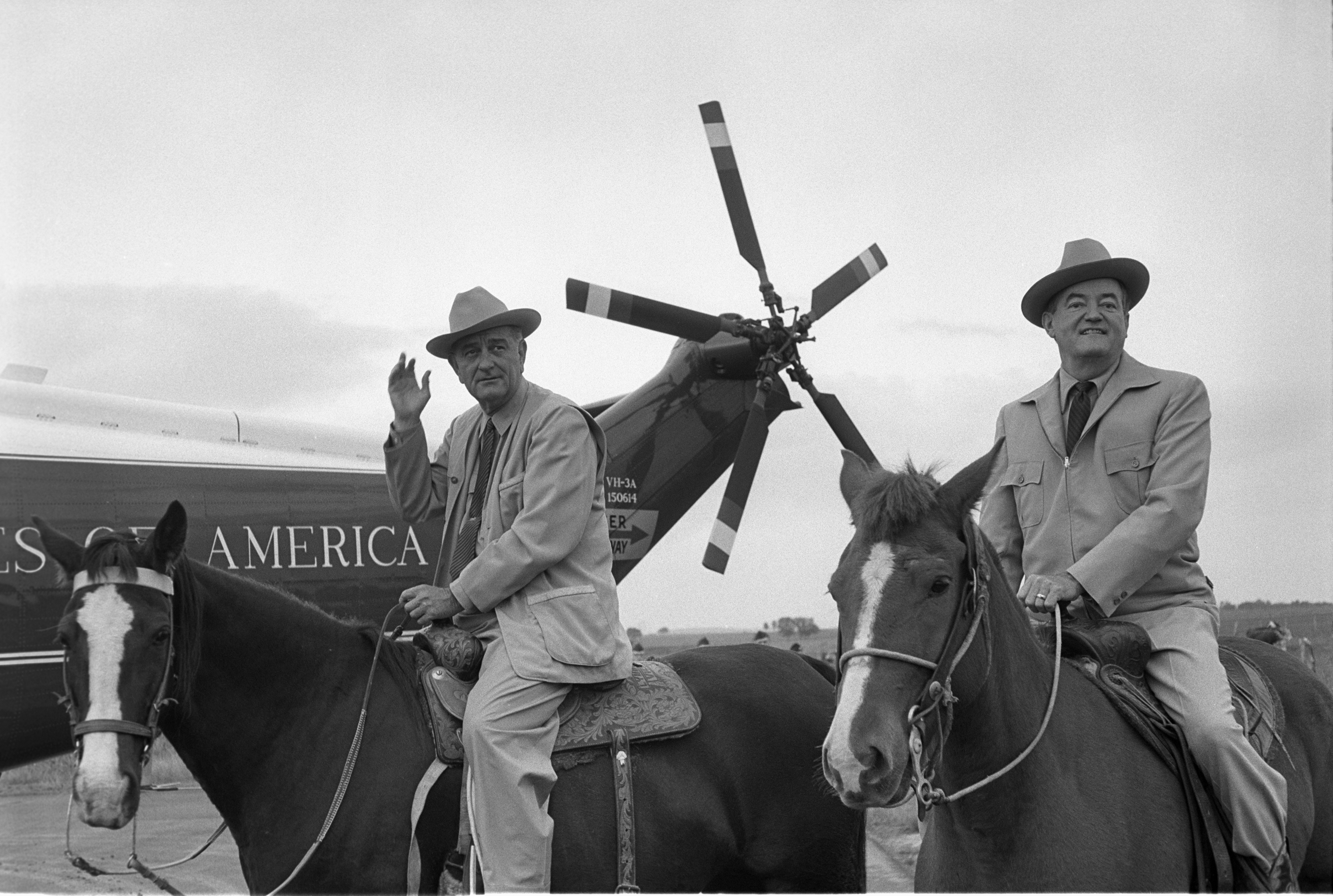
Vice President-elect Hubert Humphrey horse-riding at the LBJ ranch on November 4, 1964. Humphrey had been elected on a ticket alongside incumbent-president Lyndon B. Johnson

In many, but not all, instances in which a new vice president has been elected, there is also a change of presidents, with a new president having been elected. This has not always been the case, however. There have been instances in which an incumbent president is reelected with a new vice president-elect as their running mate. This has often been due to an incumbent vice president having not received renomination. The most recent time this happened was in 1944, when Harry S. Truman was elected to replace Henry A. Wallace alongside the ailing three-term president Franklin D. Roosevelt. However, in other instances, this has been due to the vice presidency having been vacant, as there was no way to fill a vice presidential vacancy mid-term until the ratification of the Twenty-Fifth Amendment to the United States Constitution. The most recent time that a new vice president was elected alongside an incumbent president was in 1964, when Hubert Humphrey was elected alongside Lyndon B. Johnson, with the vice presidency being vacant due to Johnson's ascension after the assassination of President John F. Kennedy. Ever since, all elections of new vice presidents have come alongside an election of a new president. On November 5, 2024, Donald J. Trump became the first president since Roosevelt to win re-election with a different vice president JD Vance.

It is possible for an incumbent vice president to win reelection as the running mate of a new president-elect, in which case there would be a United States presidential transition with the election of a new president-elect, but there would be no vice president-elect. This first happened in 1808 when Vice President George Clinton, who was originally elected with Thomas Jefferson, was reelected as vice president with James Madison becoming president-elect. This happened again in 1828, when Vice President John C. Calhoun, who was elected vice president in 1824 with John Quincy Adams, was re-elected as vice president with Andrew Jackson becoming president-elect.

== Roles in presidential transitions ==
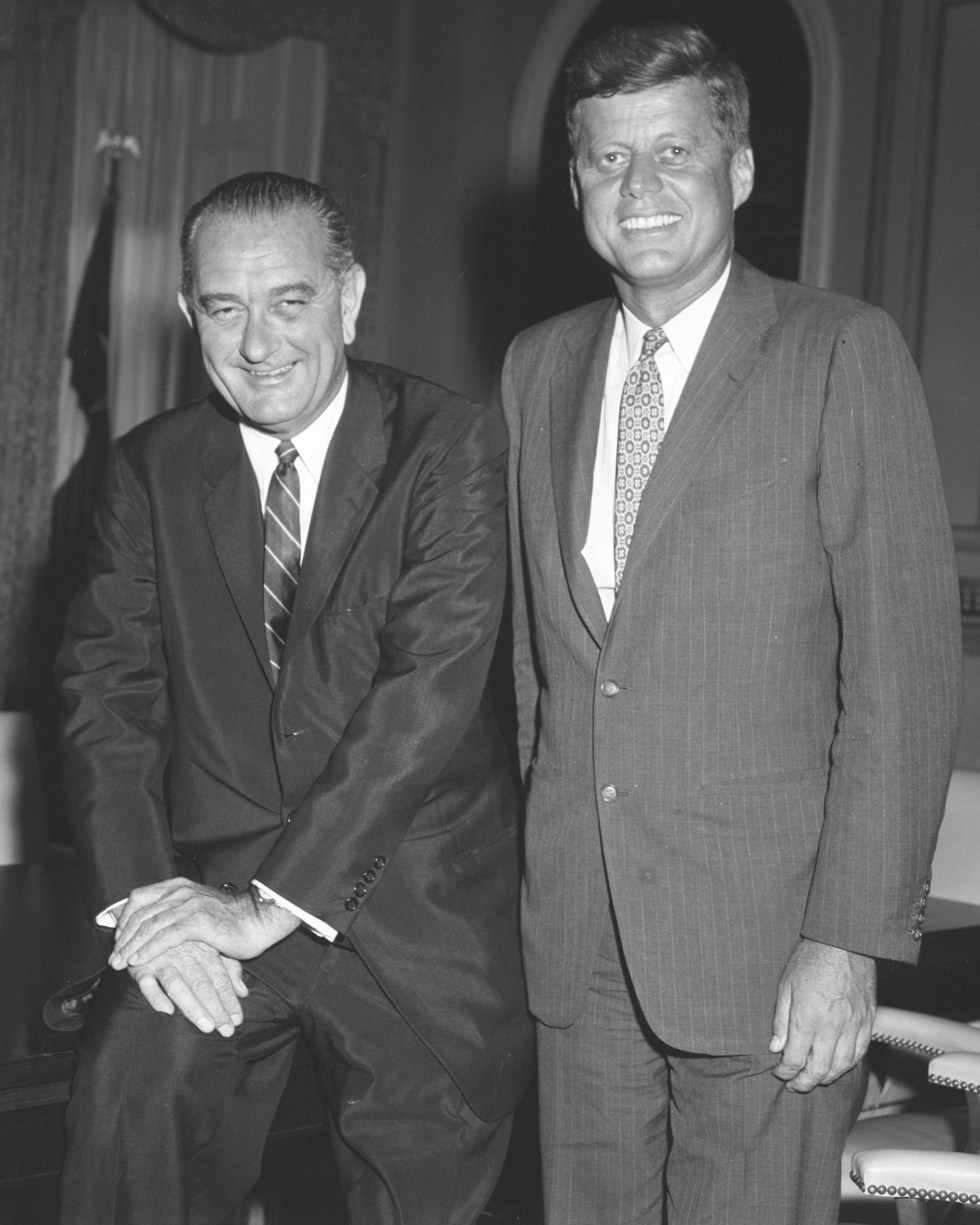
Vice President-elect Lyndon B. Johnson with President-elect John F. Kennedy during the 1960–61 presidential transition of John F. Kennedy

As previously mentioned many vice presidents-elect, and all from 1968 onwards, have been elected alongside a new president-elect, meaning that the period before many vice-presidents elects have entered office as vice president have entailed presidential transitions.

Similar to the president-elect, the General Services Administration is authorized by the Presidential Transition Act of 1963 to provide the vice president-elect with funding, office space, and various government services (such as transportation and communications) to accommodate their role in the transition between presidential administrations.

The role that various vice presidents-elect have played in United States presidential transitions has differed.

Two vice presidents-elect have been in charge of presidential transitions as formal chairmen, Dick Cheney in the presidential transition of George W. Bush (2000–01) and Mike Pence in the presidential transition of Donald Trump (2016–17).

Bill Clinton heavily involved Vice President-elect Al Gore in his 1992–93 transition, including him in a group of confidants that joined Clinton in making many of the transition's top decisions. Jimmy Carter allowed Vice President-elect Walter Mondale to play a role in his 1976–77 transition, including allowing him to provide input on some individuals being considered for roles in the administration.

Some presidents-elect have excluded their vice presidents-elect from playing a significant role in their transition. For instance, in Dwight D. Eisenhower's 1952–53 transition, Vice President-elect Richard Nixon did not play an active role. During Nixon's own 1968–69 presidential transition, Vice President-elect Spiro Agnew was similarly largely uninvolved.

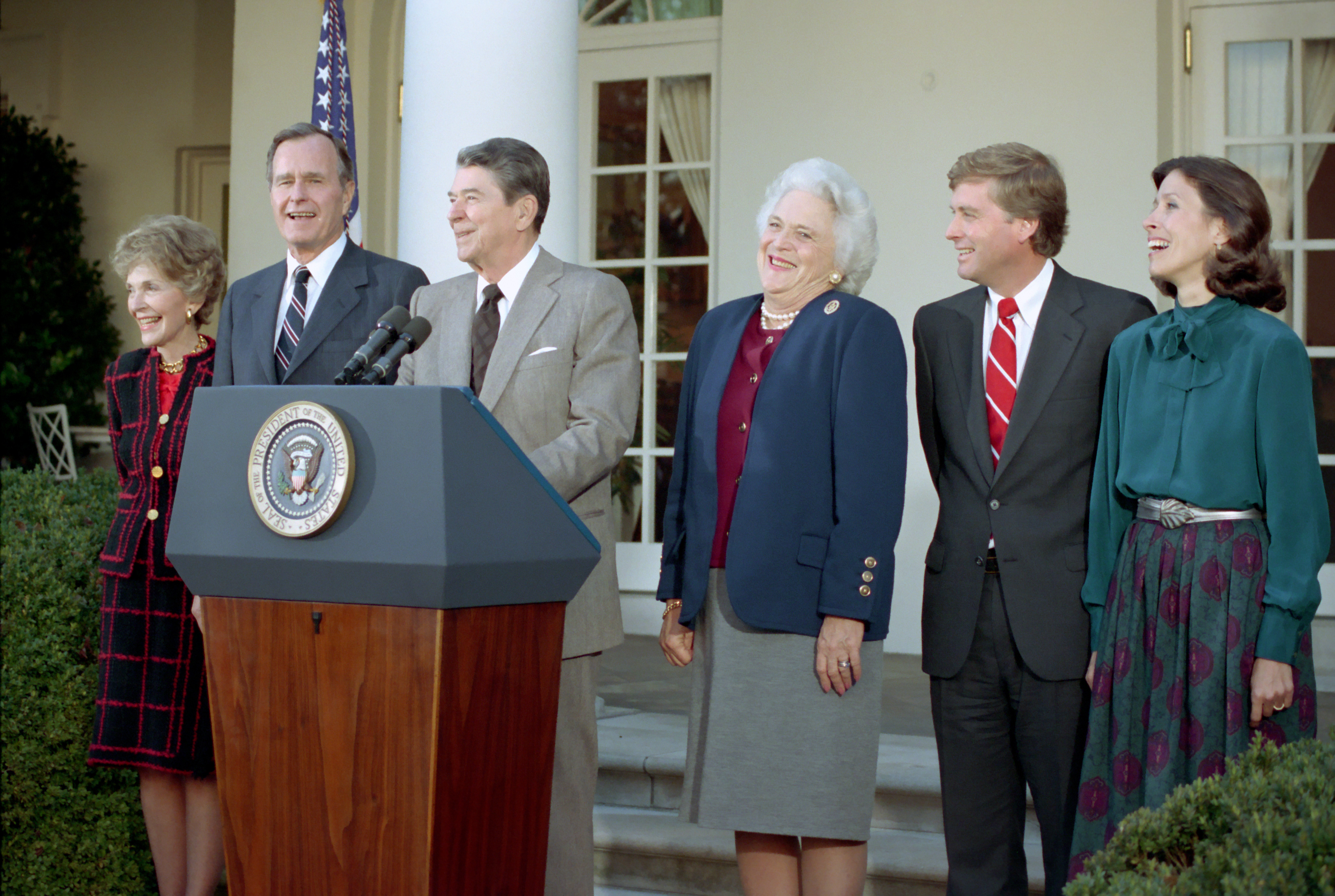
Vice President-elect Dan Quayle (second from right) and his wife Marilyn with Vice President and President-elect George H. W. Bush and his wife Barbara, as well as outgoing president Ronald Reagan and his wife Nancy during a press conference held in the White House Rose Garden during the 1988–89 presidential transition of George H. W. Bush

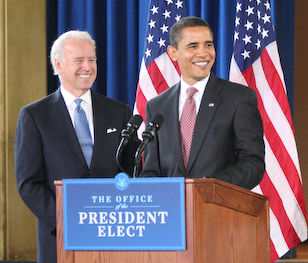
Vice President-elect Joe Biden (left) with President-elect Barack Obama during a press conference held amid the 2008–09 presidential transition of Barack Obama

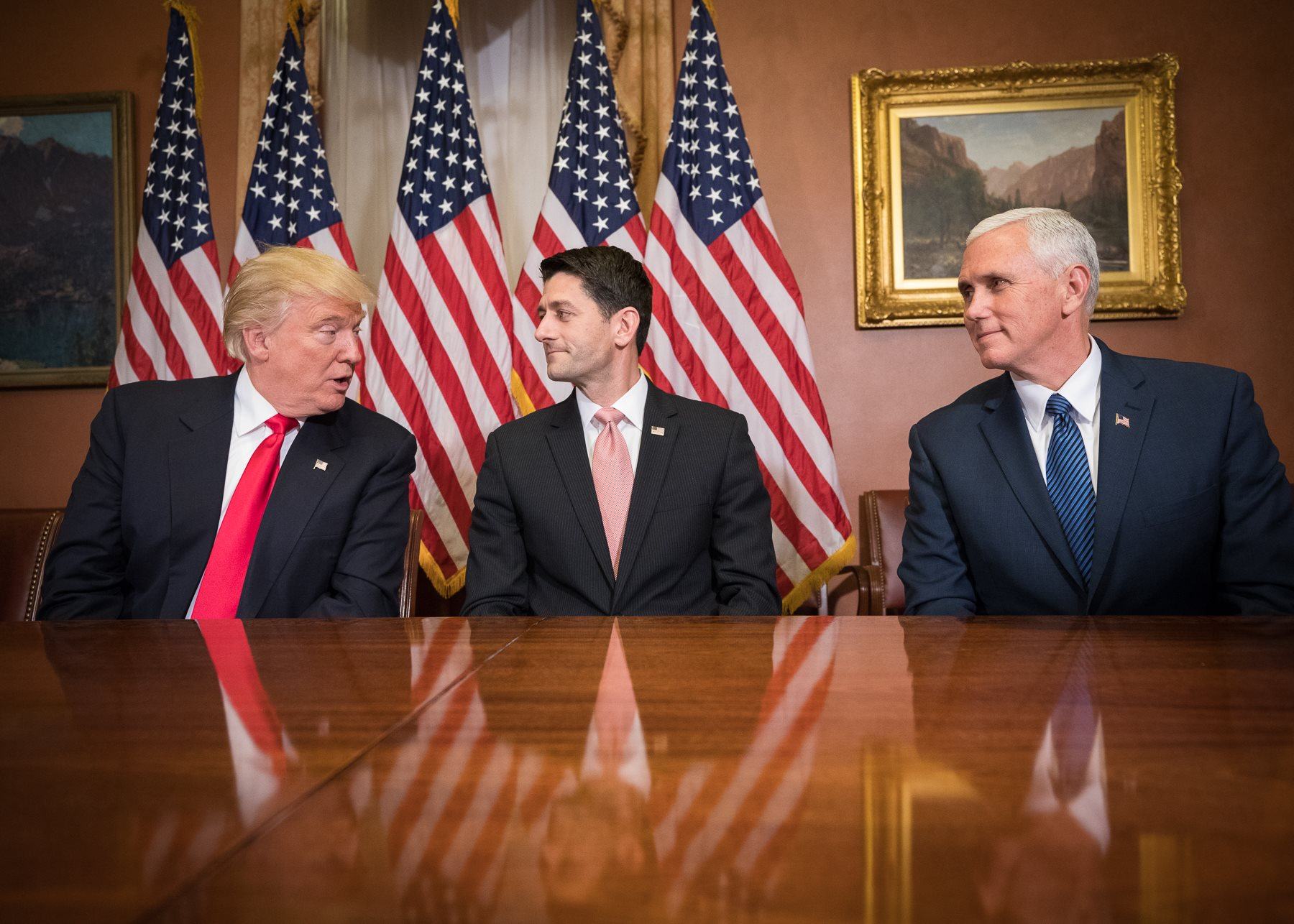
Vice President-elect Mike Pence (right) joins President-elect Donald Trump (left) at a meeting with Speaker of the House Paul Ryan during the 2016–17 presidential transition of Donald Trump

== Procedure for replacement ==
If the vice president-elect dies or resigns before the meeting of the Electoral College in December, the national committee of the winning party would, in consultation with the president-elect, choose a replacement to receive the electoral votes of the vice presidential nominee in the same manner as would happen if the former vice presidential nominee had become president-elect due to the death of the apparent winner. Assuming the requisite number the electors agreed to vote for the replacement candidate, that person would then become the vice president-elect. If such a vacancy were to occur after the electoral votes had been cast in the states, most authorities maintain that no replacement would be chosen and the new president (after taking office) would nominate a vice president, per the provisions of the Twenty-fifth Amendment to the United States Constitution.

== Vice President-designate of the United States ==
Before ratification of the 25th Amendment in 1967, the Constitution contained no provision for filling an intra-term vacancy in the vice presidency. As a result, when one occurred (and did 16 times), the office was left vacant until filled through the next ensuing election and inauguration. Since 1967, the vice presidency has been vacant twice, and a successor was nominated each time to fill the vacancy in accordance with the 25th Amendment. The first instance was in 1973 when Gerald Ford was nominated by President Richard Nixon to succeed Spiro Agnew, who had resigned. The second came in 1974, when Ford, who had succeeded to the presidency following Nixon's resignation, nominated Nelson Rockefeller to succeed him. During both vacancies, the nominee was called vice president-designate, instead of vice president-elect, as neither had been elected to the office.

== List of vice presidents-elect ==
Vice President-elect (Note: Column counts number of vice president-elect. Gerald Ford and Nelson Rockefeller are not counted because they entered office intra-term and were never elected to the vice presidency.)		Party	Following	Through
1	John Adams	Nonpartisan	Election of 1788–89 (Note: Also after a delay in the certification of the electoral votes by Congress.)	George Washington's first inauguration
2	Thomas Jefferson	Democratic-Republican	Election of 1796	John Adams's inauguration
3	Aaron Burr	Democratic-Republican	Election of 1800 (Note: Also after a contingent election in the House of Representatives.)	Thomas Jefferson's first inauguration
4	George Clinton	Democratic-Republican	Election of 1804	Thomas Jefferson's second inauguration
5	Elbridge Gerry	Democratic-Republican	Election of 1812	James Madison's second inauguration
6	Daniel D. Tompkins	Democratic-Republican	Election of 1816	James Monroe's first inauguration
7	John C. Calhoun	Democratic-Republican	Election of 1824	John Quincy Adams's inauguration
8	Martin Van Buren	Democratic	Election of 1832	Andrew Jackson's second inauguration
9	Richard Mentor Johnson	Democratic	Election of 1836	Martin Van Buren's inauguration
10	John Tyler	Whig	Election of 1840	William Henry Harrison's inauguration
11	George M. Dallas	Democratic	Election of 1844	James K. Polk's inauguration
12	Millard Fillmore	Whig	Election of 1848	Zachary Taylor's inauguration
13	William R. King	Democratic	Election of 1852	Oath of office administered March 24, 1853 (Note: Ill with tuberculosis, William King traveled to Cuba after the 1852 election in an effort to regain his health, and was not able to be in Washington, D.C. to take his oath of office on March 4, 1853. By an Act of Congress, he was allowed to take the oath outside the United States, and was sworn in on March 24, 1853 near Matanzas, Cuba. He is the only vice president to take his oath of office in a foreign country.)
14	John C. Breckinridge	Democratic	Election of 1856	James Buchanan's inauguration
15	Hannibal Hamlin	Republican	Election of 1860	Abraham Lincoln's first inauguration
16	Andrew Johnson	National Union	Election of 1864	Abraham Lincoln's second inauguration
17	Schuyler Colfax	Republican	Election of 1868	Ulysses S. Grant's first inauguration
18	Henry Wilson	Republican	Election of 1872	Ulysses S. Grant's second inauguration
19	William A. Wheeler	Republican	Election of 1876 (Note: Also after a dispute over 20 electoral votes from four states was resolved by a special Electoral Commission established by Congress.)	Rutherford B. Hayes's inauguration
20	Chester A. Arthur	Republican	Election of 1880	James A. Garfield's inauguration
21	Thomas A. Hendricks	Democratic	Election of 1884	Grover Cleveland's first inauguration
22	Levi P. Morton	Republican	Election of 1888	Benjamin Harrison's inauguration
23	Adlai Stevenson I	Democratic	Election of 1892	Grover Cleveland's second inauguration
24	Garret Hobart	Republican	Election of 1896	William McKinley's first inauguration
25	Theodore Roosevelt	Republican	Election of 1900	William McKinley's second inauguration
26	Charles W. Fairbanks	Republican	Election of 1904	Theodore Roosevelt's second inauguration
27	James S. Sherman	Republican	Election of 1908	William Howard Taft's inauguration
28	Thomas R. Marshall	Democratic	Election of 1912	Woodrow Wilson's first inauguration
29	Calvin Coolidge	Republican	Election of 1920	Warren G. Harding's inauguration
30	Charles G. Dawes	Republican	Election of 1924	Calvin Coolidge's inauguration
31	Charles Curtis	Republican	Election of 1928	Herbert Hoover's inauguration
32	John Nance Garner	Democratic	Election of 1932	Franklin D. Roosevelt's first inauguration
33	Henry A. Wallace	Democratic	Election of 1940	Franklin D. Roosevelt's third inauguration
34	Harry S. Truman	Democratic	Election of 1944	Franklin D. Roosevelt's fourth inauguration
35	Alben W. Barkley	Democratic	Election of 1948	Harry S. Truman's second inauguration
36	Richard Nixon	Republican	Election of 1952	Dwight D. Eisenhower's first inauguration
37	Lyndon B. Johnson	Democratic	Election of 1960	John F. Kennedy's inauguration
38	Hubert Humphrey	Democratic	Election of 1964	Lyndon B. Johnson's second inauguration
39	Spiro Agnew	Republican	Election of 1968	Richard Nixon's first inauguration
40	Walter Mondale	Democratic	Election of 1976	Jimmy Carter's inauguration
41	George H. W. Bush	Republican	Election of 1980	Ronald Reagan's first inauguration
42	Dan Quayle	Republican	Election of 1988	George H. W. Bush's inauguration
43	Al Gore	Democratic	Election of 1992	Bill Clinton's first inauguration
44	Dick Cheney	Republican	Election of 2000 (Note: Also after a dispute over Florida's 25 electoral votes was resolved by the Supreme Court in Bush v. Gore, which halted the Florida vote recount that was under way.)	George W. Bush's first inauguration
45	Joe Biden	Democratic	Election of 2008	Barack Obama's first inauguration
46	Mike Pence	Republican	Election of 2016	Donald Trump's first inauguration
47	Kamala Harris	Democratic	Election of 2020	Joe Biden's inauguration
48	JD Vance	Republican	Election of 2024	Donald Trump's second inauguration

== See also ==
- -elect
