= Presidential transition of John F. Kennedy =

Transfer of presidential power from Dwight D. Eisenhower to John F. Kennedy

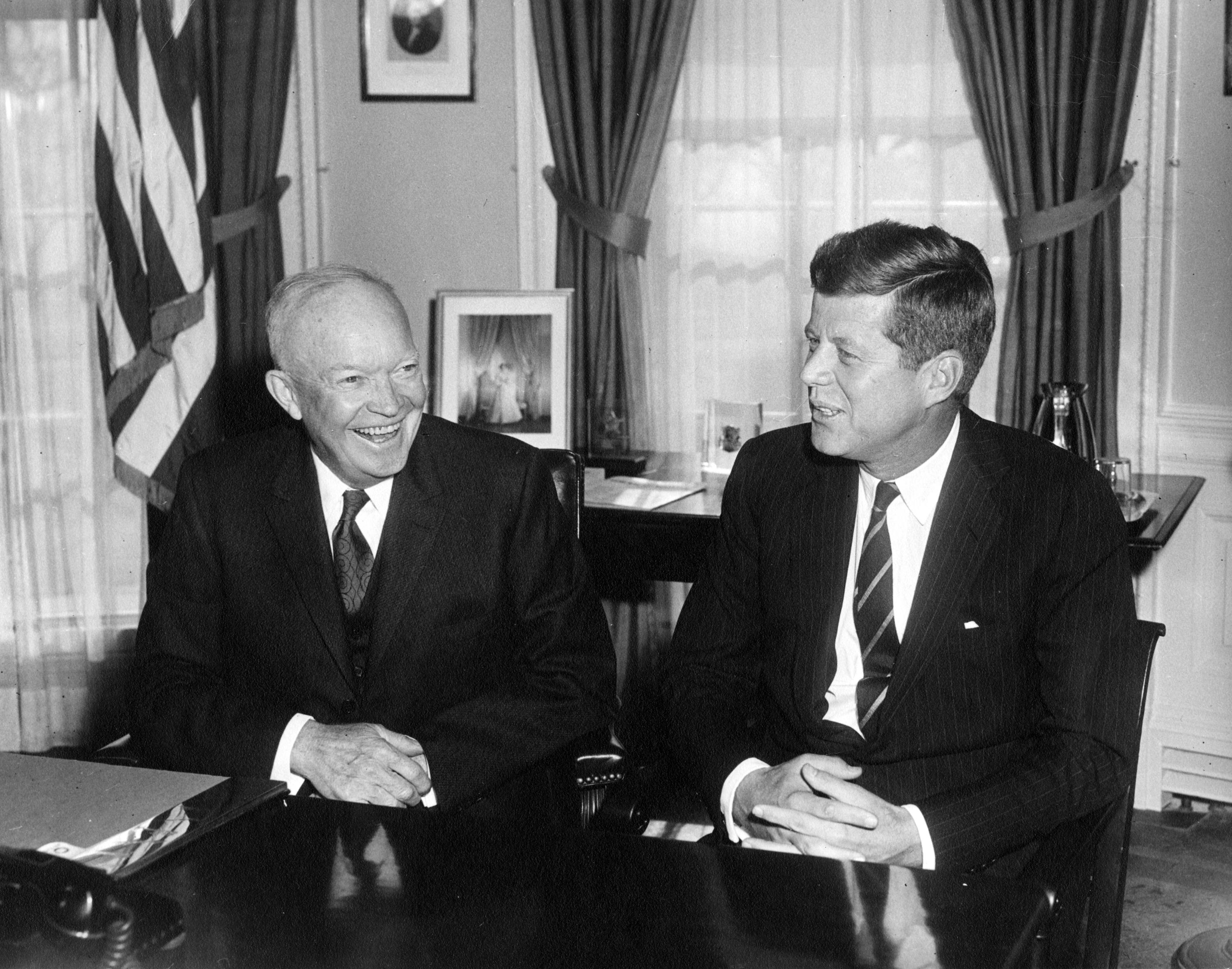
- President-elect Kennedy (right) meets with President Dwight D. Eisenhower in the White House's Oval Office on December 6, 1960
- Election date: November 8, 1960
- Transition start: November 9, 1960
- Inauguration date: January 20, 1961
- President-elect: John F. Kennedy (Democrat)
- Vice president-elect: Lyndon B. Johnson (Democrat)
- Outgoing president: Dwight D. Eisenhower (Republican)
- Outgoing vice president: Richard Nixon (Republican)
- Leader of the transition: Clark Clifford

The presidential transition of John F. Kennedy began when he won the 1960 United States presidential election, becoming the president-elect of the United States, and ended when Kennedy was inaugurated on January 20, 1961. Kennedy had become president-elect once the election results became clear on November 9, 1960, the day after the election.

Kennedy placed Clark Clifford in charge of the transition effort. Outgoing president Dwight D. Eisenhower and his administration cooperated with President-elect Kennedy and his team on a number of aspects of the transition to facilitate the peaceful transfer of power. Ahead of the election, Clifford had been studying presidential transitions both independently on behalf of Kennedy and as part of a study being undertaken by the Brookings Institution.

At the time, United States presidential transitions were far less elaborate than they have since developed to be in subsequent decades. Kennedy's transition was a volunteer-run operation. Preparations for the transition started in advance of the election, with Clark Clifford working on behalf of Kennedy to studying past presidential transitions and Richard Neustadt doing the same on behalf of the Democratic National Committee (DNC). After the election, Clifford led the transition and Neustadt continued as an advisor. Top officials of Kennedy's transition were largely individuals that had also been part of his presidential campaign, including Robert F. Kennedy, Larry O'Brien, Kenneth O'Donnell, Pierre Salinger, Sargent Shriver, Stephen Edward Smith, and Ted Sorensen, and Dick Donahue. The transition was largely funded by the DNC.

While Eisenhower and Kennedy each thought negatively of the other at the time of the transition, the two intended to avoid a rough, tension-filled transition akin to the previous one between President Truman and Eisenhower. Ahead of the election, Kennedy's campaign and the administration of term-limited outgoing president Eisenhower had taken some actions to study past transitions and prepare for the 1960–61 presidential transition. Shortly after the election, Kennedy began receiving extensive daily briefings from the Central Intelligence Agency (CIA), as well as briefings from the Department of State. Eisenhower named White House Chief of Staff Wilton Persons as his administration's representative to the transition. Particularly during the later part of the transition, Kennedy's transition head Clifford and Persons both spoke on the phone and met in person with each other frequently.

== Pre-election actions ==
A presidential transition was scheduled to occur after the 1960 United States presidential election, as incumbent president Dwight D. Eisenhower was term-limited. In anticipation of this, shortly after the 1960 presidential nominating conventions, Eisenhower created an advisory committee to study presidential transitions, headed by Robert Daniel Murphy.

Planning for a prospective presidential transition by John F. Kennedy began in advance of the election. Clark Clifford and Richard Neustadt were placed in charge of these preparations. The two largely acted independently of one another in researching presidential transitions and advising Kennedy on his potential transition. Clifford worked directly for Kennedy, while Neustadt worked for the Democratic National Committee (DNC).

Kennedy first began to talk with Clifford about his prospective presidential transition soon after winning the Democratic nomination at the 1960 Democratic National Convention. The Brookings Institution discreetly established an advisory group to review past presidential transitions and to help plan for a smooth transition into the next presidency. Involved in this review of transitions was also Laurin L. Henry, who had been writing a book on the subject of presidential transitions (Presidential Transitions), which would be published that November. The Brookings Institution review was funded with a grant from the Carnegie Corporation of New York. David W. Kendall, incumbent president Dwight D. Eisenhower's White House counsel, was key in establishing this project and bringing both major party candidates into the fold. Shortly after Kennedy received the Democratic Party's presidential nomination, he met with former Franklin Delano Roosevelt administration official James H. Rowe with the goal of discussing how he might prospectively deal with post-election matters. Rowe was a member of the team conducting the Brookings Institution Review of presidential transitions, and their discussion resulted in Kennedy appointing Clark Clifford to participate in the review, advise Kennedy on how he would run a post-election transition, and prepare a memorandum for Kennedy on how to run a transition. The Eisenhower administration had Secretary to the Cabinet Brad Patterson serve as its liaison attend these discussions, while the team of Kennedy's opponent, Richard Nixon, sent Robert E. Cushman Jr. as their liaison.

Neustadt had first been asked by Chairman of the Democratic National Committee Henry M. Jackson to write a memo on presidential transitions, which Jackson received on September 15. On September 18, 1960, days after Jackson received the memo, he held a meeting with Kennedy and Neustadt at Kennedy's house in the Georgetown neighborhood of Washington, D.C., where Kennedy read the memo and asked Neustadt various questions. Kennedy then tasked Neustadt with elaborating on his memo by creating a report assessing post-election problems for presidents-elect, particularly those regarding organizing a White House staff.

In mid-1960, Kennedy also announced the creation of a special defense and foreign policy committee led by Paul Nitze.

== Organization of the transition ==
United States presidential transitions were far smaller and more informal at the time Kennedy was elected than they have since become. Kennedy based his transition operations largely out of his personal residence in the Georgetown neighborhood of Washington, D.C. He additionally held transition planning meetings at his home and other locations in Washington, including his U.S. Senate office, the Democratic National Committee offices, his former campaign headquarters in the Esso Building, Clark Clifford's law offices, and conference rooms at the Brookings Institution. Serving the function of Kennedy's personal offices during the campaign was his Georgetown residence, his family's Palm Beach, Florida, residence, and the penthouse of the Carlyle Hotel.

The post-election transition was headed by Clark Clifford, who worked with a handful of close associates of Kennedy. None of the transition workers received financial compensation. The transition relied on volunteer staffers. The transition's top officials were individuals who had been part of Kennedy's presidential campaign. These individuals happened to largely be relatively young, but were also experienced in Washington, D.C., politics. Many were even more so experienced than their counterparts in previous presidential transitions. On November 10, during a meeting in Hyannis Port, Massachusetts, with his top advisors, Kennedy assigned them their roles for the transition. Clifford and Neustadt were named the formal transition advisors, tasked with planning the transition. Clifford was additionally named the transition's liaison to the Eisenhower administration. During the transition, Kennedy had Neustadt compile and send him further papers providing specific in-depth analysis of specific positions and jobs in a presidential administration. Pierre Salinger was assigned to be the head of the transition's press team (the press secretary). Kenneth O'Donnell was put in charge of administration and appointments. Sargent Shriver (Kennedy's brother-in-law) was put in charge of the selection process for high-level appointees and Larry O'Brien was put in charge of patronage appointments. Dick Donahue was also tasked with assisting in the process of selecting planned presidential appointees as well as managing communications between the transition team and Vice President-elect Lyndon B. Johnson. Ted Sorensen was put in charge of creating the policy agenda and the writing of statements and speeches. Robert F. Kennedy (Kennedy's brother) was a general advisor to the transition. Stephen Edward Smith (Kennedy's brother-in-law) was in charge of the transition's finances. Additionally advising the transition on certain matters were Kennedy's brother Ted Kennedy and father, Joseph P. Kennedy.

As part of the transition, Paul Samuelson headed an economic task force. Harris Wofford was charged with leading the transition in laying-out policy related to civil rights, as well as selecting civil rights-related personnel. Others who played a role in the transition included James E. Webb. There had been tensions during the campaign between individuals aligned with Sorensen and individuals aligned with O'Donnell. To diffuse any similar tensions if they arose, Fred Dutton was brought into the transition in an initially unclear role to act as a sort of neutral figure.

Kennedy's transition effort had to request funding from the Democratic National Committee in order to pay its expenses. Ultimately, the DNC provided most of the funding for the transition.

== Start of the transition ==
President-elect Kennedy with Vice President-elect Lyndon B. Johnson during the transition

Kennedy, arguably, did not become president-elect of the United States until November 9, 1960, the day after the election. While The New York Times (among the first outlets to project Kennedy to be the victor) had projected Kennedy's victory shortly before midnight EST on election night, many other prominent media outlets, such as NBC, waited until the morning of November 9 to project Kennedy as the victor.

After Nixon conceded the election on November 9, President Eisenhower sent President-elect Kennedy two telegrams. One of the telegrams was sent to briefly congratulate the president-elect, and the second one saw Eisenhower both promise to cooperate on an orderly transfer of power and give proposals on how to proceed with one. In Eisenhower's second telegram, he offered to meet with Kennedy, "to consider problems of continuity of government and orderly transfer of Executive responsibility on January 20th from my administration to yours". He also named his White House chief of staff, Wilton Persons, as his administration's representative for the transition. He stated that Persons would be prepared to make arrangements by which representatives appointed by Kennedy could meet with heads of executive branch departments. He also suggested that Kennedy's representatives meet with the White House budget office hold meetings to discuss government administration and budget matters and that Kennedy's representatives also meet with the secretary of state in order to receive foreign policy updates.

Kennedy held his first post-election press conference on November 9, where he discussed the transition and announced, for the first time, the names of several individuals that he had selected for his administration. That same day, Kennedy received the memorandum that Clark Clifford had created for him. The following day, Kennedy and his team held a staff meeting in which they went over the three separate memos created by Clifford, Neustadt, and the Brookings Institution.

On November 14, Clifford met with Wilton Persons at the White House for their first face-to-face meeting to discuss the transition. During the meeting, Persons agreed to Clifford's request to have the Kennedy team send an office manager to examine the organizational structure of Eisenhower's White House. It was also at this meeting that the two scheduled the December 6 meeting between the president-elect and the outgoing president. After their meeting, they provided a general summary of the two-hour meeting to deputy White House press secretary Anne Williams Wheaton, who then provided a briefing on it to the press. After this meeting, further transition activities by Clifford and Persons would be done closed doors, with the two receding from the public eye for the rest of the transition. By December 1, the two had held five in-person meetings. As the transition progressed, Clifford and Person would meet twice or thrice weekly with Persons. Clifford was often accompanied at these meetings by Ted Sorenson, and Persons was often accompanied by individuals such as White House counsel Dave Kendall and White House executive clerk William J. Hopkins. They would also have daily telephone conversations. Per instructions issued by Eisenhower several days after the two men's November 14 meeting, Persons kept a detailed written record of his activities in the transition.

== Intelligence briefings for the president-elect ==
At the November 14 meeting between Clifford and Persons, arrangements were made for Kennedy to receive briefings. Kennedy afterwards received extensive daily briefings from the Central Intelligence Agency (CIA), including some delivered directly from Richard M. Bissell Jr. and Allen Dulles (Director of Central Intelligence). Kennedy also received briefings from the State Department. Among the subjects that the CIA briefed on Kennedy were covert plans against Fidel Castro of Cuba, as the CIA was planning what would ultimately become the Bay of Pigs Invasion. In response to tensions with Cuba, in March 1960, the Eisenhower administration approved the training of a group Cuban exiles to lead an overthrow of Castro's government. These exiles would later unsuccessfully undertake the Bay of Pigs Invasion. In 1987, historian Carl M. Brauer would fault the fiasco of the Bay of Pigs Invasion on Kennedy and his team having been too trusting of the bureaucratic experts in the government during the transition.

Kennedy was given forewarning on certain Eisenhower administration actions during the transition. For instance, when Eisenhower decided on December 5 to put a pause on the nuclear arm negotiations that were taking place with the Soviet Union in Geneva, Secretary of State Christian Herter decided to inform Kennedy before informing the United Kingdom and the Soviet Union.

== Eisenhower's role in transition and his relations with Kennedy ==
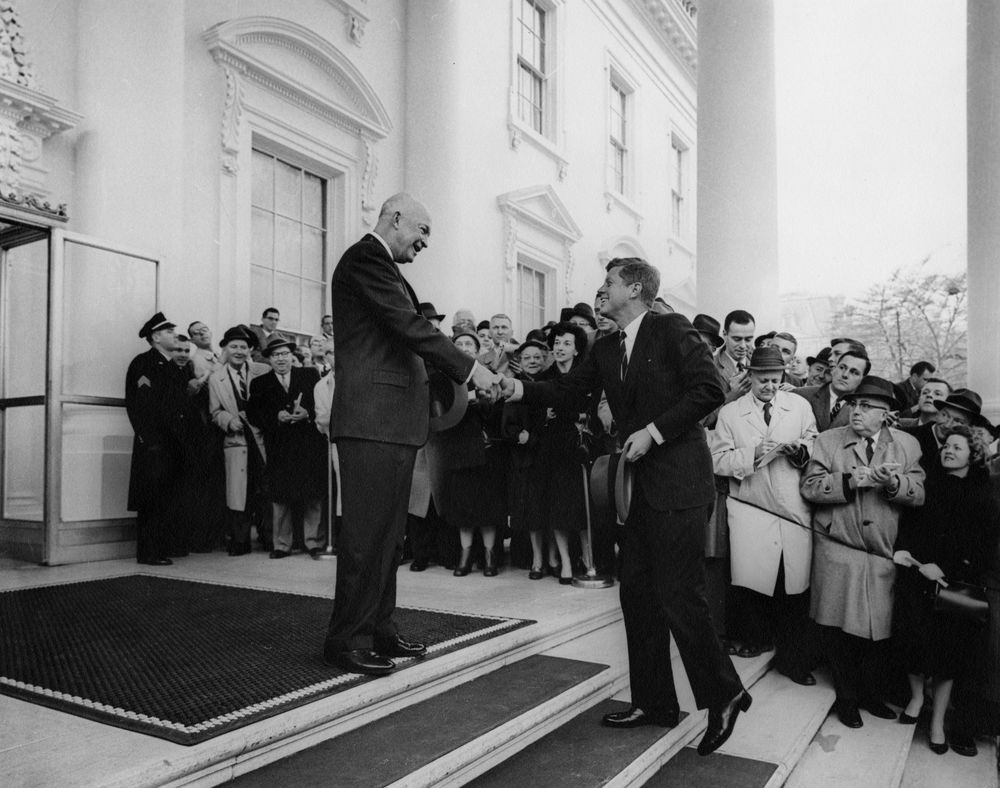
President-elect Kennedy (right) shakes outgoing president Dwight D. Eisenhower's hand at their White House meeting on December 6, 1960

The presidential transition marked a generational change in the presidency with the youngest person to win a United States presidential election succeeding Eisenhower, who at the time was the oldest man to have served as president of the United States. Going into the transition, Kennedy and Eisenhower had both thought ill of one another, in large part due to conceptions of each other that were shaped by this generation gap. However, Eisenhower, who had failed to run a smooth transition when he was president-elect, understood the costs of a poorly managed transition, and sought overall to help to make Kennedy's transition run smoothly. Moreover, Kennedy also desired to avoid the sort of open antagonism that had been displayed between Eisenhower and Truman during Eisenhower's presidential transition. Kennedy understood that despite his own harsh judgements of him, Eisenhower was still a popular figure in the opinion of the American public. Eisenhower sent Kennedy a congratulatory message after the birth of the president-elect's son John F. Kennedy Jr. (born November 25, 1960), helping to break the ice between the two of them.

During the transition, outgoing President Eisenhower held two meetings with Kennedy; one on December 6 and another on January 19. The December 6 meeting was the first time the two men had ever had a one-on-one meeting. Outside of large gatherings Kennedy and Eisenhower had both attended during Eisenhower's presidency, their only previous meeting had been a brief interaction Kennedy had with then-commanding general Eisenhower when accompanying Navy secretary James Forrestal to the warfront in 1945. During their post-election meetings they discussed, among other things, nuclear codes and foreign policy topics such as Berlin (tensions between East Germany and West Germany), Guatemala, the Far East, conflict in Asia, Cuba, Pentagon reform, and the operations of the National Security Council. Eisenhower also shared insight into foreign leaders such as Charles de Gaulle, Harold Macmillan, and Konrad Adenauer. Their first meeting, on December 6, saw the two men meet alone for two hours in the White House's Oval Office, before joining several members of the outgoing Cabinet (Secretary of the Treasury Robert B. Anderson, Secretary of Defense Thomas S. Gates Jr., Secretary of State Christian Herter) for a second meeting in the Roosevelt Room. Clark Clifford and Wilton Persons also attended the group meeting in the Roosevelt Room, and White House Press Secretary James Hagerty and Kennedy advisor Pierre Salinger both joined to help write a joint statement to be released by the president and president-elect after the meeting. Their second meeting had been requested by Kennedy, as he particularly hoped to further discuss the Laotian Civil War.

Eisenhower thought that the Kennedy administration would blame him for its failures and take credit for Eisenhower's successes. He worried that any holdovers from his administration would be used as foils by the new administration. Eisenhower discouraged senior members of his own administration from accepting jobs in Kennedy's. For example, when he discovered that C. Douglas Dillon, under secretary of state in the Eisenhower administration, was under consideration to be Kennedy's secretary of the treasury, Eisenhower urged Dillon not to accept the position, warning him that he would become a scapegoat to the "radicals" in Kennedy's administration. Eisenhower was angered when Dillon disregarded his advice and accepted the position. Other Republicans were worried that Dillon holding this role would limit their ability to attack Kennedy on the economy.

Eisenhower's White House executive clerk William J. Hopkins provided the Kennedy transition team with detailed briefing books on the incumbent White House staff, as well as maps illustrating the layout of the West Wing of the White House and the Old Executive Office Building. During the transition, Eisenhower's administration also prepared their documents for transfer to the future Dwight D. Eisenhower Presidential Library.

Per later recounting by some officials involved, in the waning days of his presidency, Eisenhower invited Kennedy to play a role in decision-making on significant issues, but Kennedy declined the offer. Kennedy advisor Ted Sorensen would later write that Kennedy, "thought it was inappropriate, unwise, until he had full responsibility and information to participate in, commit himself to, or even comment or be consulted upon these actions being taken by the outgoing administration between election and inauguration – including a mission to western Europe to improve the payments balance and ending of all diplomatic relations with Cuba." Incidentally, during Eisenhower's own presidential transition from President Truman there were reports that Truman had extended a similar offer which Eisenhower had also declined.

On January 3, with just more than two weeks left in his presidency, the lame duck Eisenhower made a major international relations decision and ended diplomatic relations with Cuba and closed the United States Embassy in Cuba. On January 17, Eisenhower delivered his farewell address. This was considered a significant speech of Eisenhower's presidency, being regarded as the closing "bookend" to his tenure as president.

== Kennedy and Johnson's resignations from the U.S. Senate ==
On December 22, Kennedy formally resigned his seat in the United States Senate. On January 3, immediately after taking an oath for the new Senate term to which he had been elected in the November 1960 Senate election (which coincided with the presidential election), Vice President-elect Johnson resigned from his Senate seat. That day, at the urging of president-elect Kennedy, Mike Mansfield successfully ran to be senate majority leader at the meeting of the Senate Democratic caucus held at the Dirksen Senate Office Building. After Mansfield was elected to the position, Johnson asked Mansfield to allow him to have office S-211 (which Johnson been using as his office while senate majority leader) and several other rooms as his vice presidential office at the Capitol. He also wanted the Senate Democrats to keep Bobby Baker as party secretary. These two requests were granted. Johnson, as a third request, asked that, as president of the United States Senate (a role which the vice president formally holds), he be made permanent presiding officer of the Senate Democratic caucus, making the (false) claim that Alben Barkley had done the same when he was vice president. The Democratic caucus was shocked when Johnson brought this proposal to them. After made his proposal, Senator Albert Gore Sr. rose and voiced a long litany of concerns about it. Mansfield threatened to resign as majority leader if the caucus did not approve it. While they approved it, the 63 Democratic senators voted only 46 to 17 to approve it, which was seen as a humiliating total for Johnson. After this, Johnson abandoned the idea of serving as the Senate's "super leader", thereby surrendering his position of dominance in the Senate.

== Other activities of Kennedy ==
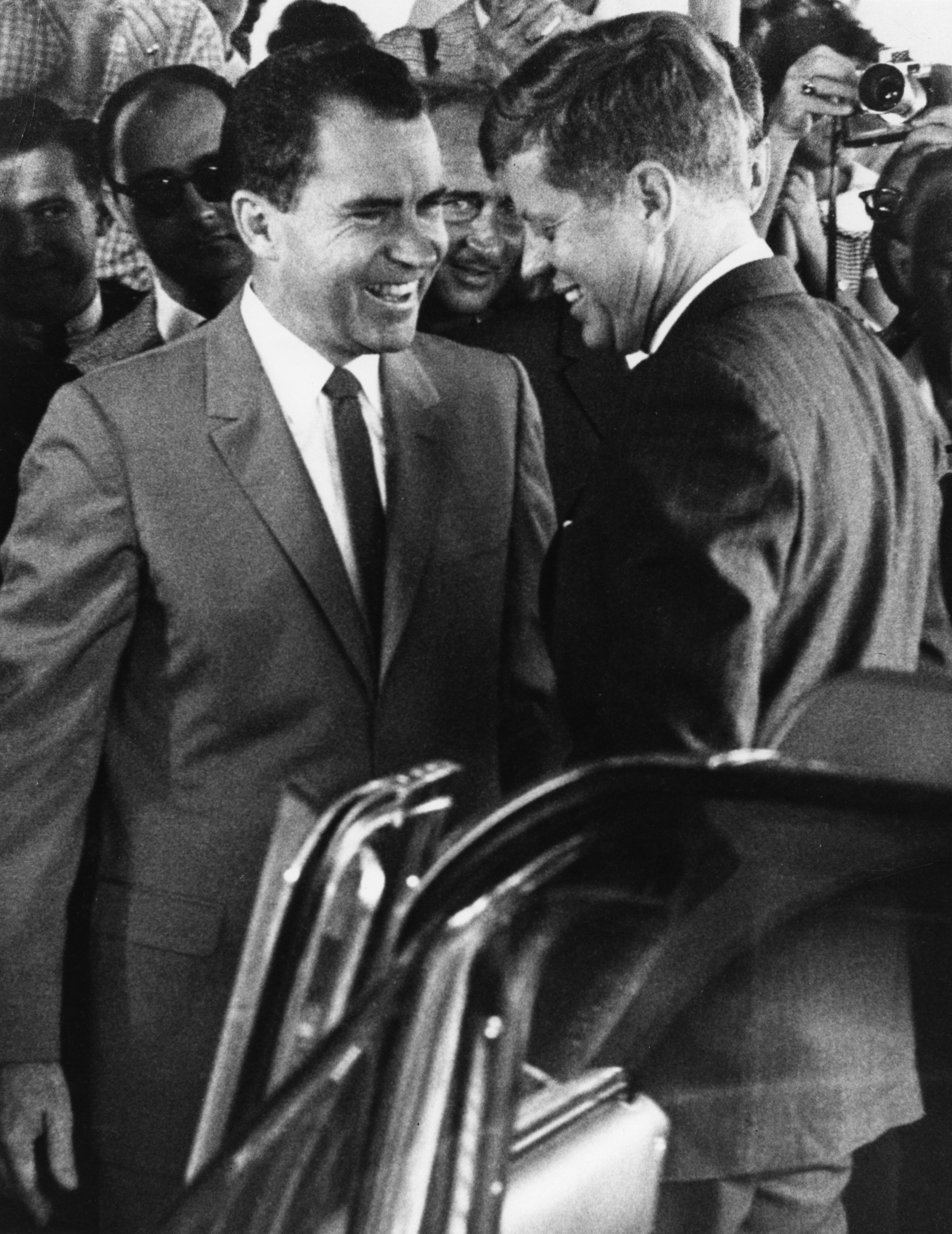
Kennedy (right) meets with Richard Nixon in Key Biscayne, Florida, on November 14, 1960

Early into the transition, Kennedy had a long vacation at a home owned by his father, Joseph P. Kennedy, in Palm Beach, Florida. His wife, Jacqueline, due to give birth in three weeks (to their son John F. Kennedy Jr.), did not join him, as she had been advised by her doctors against traveling to Florida.

On November 11, Kennedy spoke by telephone with former president Herbert Hoover. On November 14, Kennedy traveled from Palm Beach to Key Biscayne, Florida to meet with Richard Nixon, who was both his presidential election opponent and the outgoing vice president. This meeting had been arranged with the assistance of Kennedy's father Joseph P. Kennedy and former president Hoover. On November 16, Kennedy flew to Texas to meet with Vice President-elect Johnson at the LBJ Ranch. This was the first time that the two had met with one another since the election.

On December 11, Kennedy avoided an assassination effort. That day, Richard Paul Pavlick delayed his planned assassination attempt and was apprehended by authorities four days later, before he could carry one out.

On January 19, after his meeting with Eisenhower, Kennedy and his secretary of labor designee Arthur Goldberg met at the home of Kennedy's friend, William Walton. Kennedy and Goldberg then held a meeting with the AFL–CIO Executive Council, as well as other trade union leaders, at the Carlton Hotel. Also, Kennedy held a meeting at the Sheraton-Park Hotel with the governors of 38 states.

== Meeting of the presidential spouses ==
On December 9, Kennedy's wife Jacqueline received a tour of the White House from Eisenhower's wife Mamie. This was marked by an unfriendly moment in the transition. Mamie Eisenhower was apparently unhappy with having her husband be succeeded by a Democrat, and herself being succeeded by a woman she held in low regard. Despite Mrs. Kennedy having given birth to her son via caesarean section only two weeks earlier, Mrs. Eisenhower did not inform Kennedy that there was a wheelchair available for her to use on the tour. Sensing Mrs. Eisenhower's displeasure during the tour, Mrs. Kennedy kept her composure while in Mrs. Eisenhower's presence, finally collapsing in private once she returned home. When Mamie Eisenhower was later questioned as to why she did not inform Mrs. Kennedy of the wheelchair available for her use, she simply stated, "Because she never asked."

== Selection of appointees ==
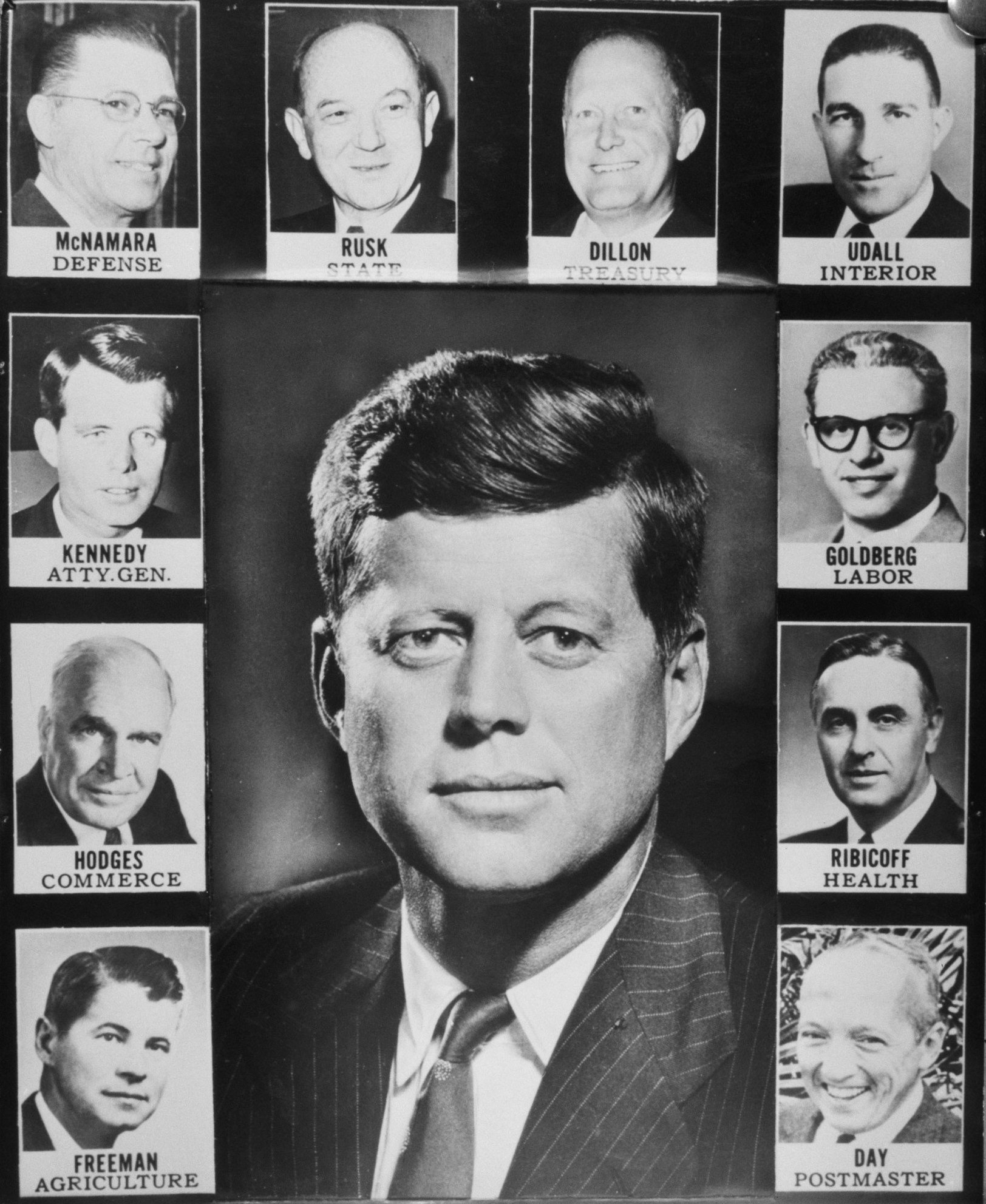
Kennedy and the members of his cabinet (except Vice-President Lyndon Johnson)

Kennedy spent the eight weeks following his election choosing his Cabinet and other top officials. Kennedy's top priority after becoming president-elect was to craft his national security team. Kennedy believed that the establishment figures of the United States military were largely too obsessed with nuclear weapons, and too willing to utilize them. Kennedy would, ultimately, craft an administration that saw military decisions placed in the hands of a greater number of civilian figures than had been the case in Eisenhower's administration. On November 9, in announcing his first choices for his administration, Kennedy also announced that he had asked J. Edgar Hoover to remain as director of the Federal Bureau of Investigation (FBI) and Allen Dulles to remain as director of the Central Intelligence Agency (CIA) and that both had accepted his requests to remain.

Some individuals declined positions in Kennedy's administration. Kennedy offered Robert A. Lovett a position in his Cabinet, but Lovett declined. Additionally, Kennedy had originally offered the position of postmaster general to Congressman William L. Dawson, who also declined. Had he accepted this offer and been confirmed to the position, Dawson would have been first black Cabinet secretary in United States history. To avoid creating a conflict of interest regarding their roles in the transition, both Clifford and Neustadt attempted to remove themselves from consideration for positions in Kennedy's administration. However, before the end of the transition Neustadt ultimately would be designated to serve as the Kennedy White House's consultant on government organization.

Ahead of the election, many correspondences were sent to Kennedy and the Democratic National Committee requesting appointments to government positions. Larry O'Brien was tasked with handling the management of such correspondence. In addition, Vice President-elect Johnson and his staff sent requests of their own for individuals they wanted to see appointed. Requests coming from Johnson and his office were forwarded to Dick Donahue.

On December 17, Kennedy announced the last of his ten Cabinet designees, J. Edward Day for postmaster general. John D. Morris of The New York Times News Service noted of Kennedy's Cabinet,

It is the first to include two Jews and the first to include a brother of the President and the first in which a member lists his occupation as "foundation executive". Its average age is 47, making it the youngest of the twentieth century but six years older than the first Cabinet of the first President, George Washington.

The age of many members of the designated Cabinet was young. Two of Kennedy's designees for his Cabinet would be the youngest holders of their designated Cabinet positions: Secretary of Agriculture-designate Orville Freeman (age 42) and Secretary of Defense-designate Robert McNamara (age 44). Morris noted that Eisenhower's initial Cabinet had averaged a decade older in age than Kennedy's designated Cabinet. The youngest designee was Robert F. Kennedy, at the age of 35. Robert F. Kennedy was to be the second-youngest United States attorney general, after only Richard Rush, who had been 33 when he assumed the office. Despite concerns about nepotism, Kennedy's father successfully demanded that Robert F. Kennedy be chosen for this position. Within the United States Senate, the Republican Senate Minority Leader, Everett Dirksen, expressed doubts about Robert Kennedy's level of legal experience but found him competent otherwise and supported the president's ability to choose his own cabinet members. There was some thought that Southern Democrats might oppose the nomination. The chair of the Senate Judiciary Committee, James Eastland, had some liking for Robert Kennedy, but another influential southerner, Richard Russell Jr., was not favorably disposed. At the behest of Vice President-elect Johnson, who wanted to demonstrate that he was still politically relevant, Bobby Baker, the Senate majority secretary and a protégé of Johnson, helped persuade Russell to not move against the appointment. How important Johnson's intercession was is uncertain, as still other southern Democrats, such as McClellan and Sam Ervin, embraced Robert Kennedy due to his past work on the Senate Labor Rackets Committee, and overall the nomination was likely never in doubt. On January 13, Robert Kennedy testified before the Judiciary Committee for two hours, with questioning that was largely friendly. Pressed by Roman Hruska about his lack of experience, Robert Kennedy responded: "In my estimation I think that I have had invaluable experience ... I would not have given up one year of experience that I have had over the period since I graduated from law school for experience practicing law in Boston." At the conclusion of the hearing, Kennedy's nomination received unanimous approval from the committee.

Kennedy, a Democrat, designated some Republicans for roles in his administration, including McGeorge Bundy, Douglas Dillon, and Robert McNamara. Dillon, a business-oriented Republican that had served as Eisenhower's undersecretary of state, was to be Kennedy's secretary of the treasury. Kennedy balanced this appointment of a conservative figure by choosing liberal Democrats for two other important economic advisory posts, choosing David E. Bell for the director of the Bureau of the Budget and Walter Heller as chairman of the Council of Economic Advisers. Robert McNamara, who was selected for secretary of defense, was well known as one of Ford Motor Company's "Whiz Kids".

Kennedy rejected liberal pressure to select Adlai Stevenson II as secretary of state, instead choosing Dean Rusk, a restrained former Truman-administration official. Stevenson accepted the non-policy position of United States ambassador to the United Nations.

In his White House staff, Kennedy did not choose a formal White House chief of staff. He instead preferred the idea of effectively acting as his own chief of staff.

During his presidency, Eisenhower had created the first White House Office of Congressional Relations to oversee liaison between the White House and the legislature. Clark Clifford's memo had advised Kennedy not to carry this over into his White House, as he believed the vice president would serve as an effective-enough liaison between the president and the Congress. He also believed that the chairman of the Democratic National Committee and Democratic National Committee staff would be able to sufficiently sort out demands related to patronage coming from congressional Democrats, making such a liaison unnecessary for that concern. In a November meeting between Kennedy and Richard Neustadt, the matter of congressional liaison had been discussed. In a December 7, 1960, follow-up paper that Neustadt had written recalled their discussion on this. This paper makes it evident that Kennedy had rejected the advice from Clifford to have the Democratic National Committee handle patronage concerns, and instead opted to have a senior aide do so in the function of a congressional liaison, making this one of the concerns that Larry O'Brien would be assigned to deal this in his position.

=== Defense and foreign policy ===
- Robert McNamara, secretary of defense (announced December 13, 1960)
- Dean Rusk, secretary of state (announced December 12, 1960)
- Adlai Stevenson II, United States ambassador to the United Nations (announced December 12, 1960)
- Eugene M. Zuckert, secretary of the Air Force (announced December 28, 1960)
- Elvis Jacob Stahr Jr. secretary of the Army
- John Connally, secretary of the Navy (announced December 28, 1960)
- Allen Dulles, director of the Central Intelligence Agency (announced November 9, 1960) incumbent officeholder
- J. Edgar Hoover, director of the Federal Bureau of Investigation (announced November 9, 1960) incumbent officeholder
- McGeorge Bundy, national security advisor (announced December 31, 1960)
- Roswell Gilpatric, deputy secretary of defense
- Chester B. Bowles, under secretary of state
- George Ball, under secretary of state for economic affairs
- Joseph V. Charyk, under secretary of the Air Force incumbent officeholder
- G. Mennen Williams, assistant secretary of state for African affairs
- Roger W. Jones, deputy under secretary of state for administration
- Angier Biddle Duke, chief of protocol
- Lyle S. Garlock, assistant secretary of the Air Force for financial management incumbent officeholder
- James H. Wakelin Jr., assistant secretary of the Navy for research and development incumbent officeholder
- Walt Whitman Rostow, deputy national security advisor
- Charles E. Bohlen, special advisor on Soviet affairs
- W. Averell Harriman, special ambassador at large
- John Kenneth Galbraith, United States ambassador to India
- David K. E. Bruce, United States ambassador to the United Kingdom
- Herschel C. Loveless, member of the Federal Renegotiation Board
- John J. McCloy, chief of the U.S. Disarmament Administration
- George McGovern, director of Food for Peace

=== Domestic policy ===
- Robert F. Kennedy, attorney general (announced December 16, 1960)
- J. Edward Day, postmaster general (announced December 16, 1960)
- Orville Freeman, secretary of agriculture (announced December 15, 1960)
- Luther H. Hodges, secretary of commerce (announced December 8, 1960)
- Abraham Ribicoff, secretary of health, education, and welfare (announced December 1, 1960)
- Stewart Udall, secretary of the interior (announced December 7, 1960)
- Arthur Goldberg, secretary of labor (announced December 15, 1960)
- Luther Terry, surgeon general (announced January 16, 1961)
- Byron White, deputy attorney general (announced December 16, 1960)
- W. Willard Wirtz, undersecretary of labor (announced January 8, 1961)
- H. H. Brawley, deputy postmaster general
- James K. Carr, under secretary of the interior (announced January 12, 1961)
- Edward Gudeman, under secretary of commerce
- Archibald Cox, solicitor general of the United States (announced December 28, 1960)
- Robert C. Weaver, administrator of the Housing and Home Finance Agency (announced December 31, 1960)
- Newton N. Minow, chairman of the chairman of the Federal Communications Commission
- Rex Marion Whitton, administrator of the Federal Highway Administration
- Harry J. Anslinger, commissioner of the Federal Bureau of Narcotics (announced December 16, 1960) incumbent officeholder
- Floyd Dominy, commissioner of the United States Bureau of Reclamation (announced January 12, 1961) incumbent officeholder
- John S. Gleason Jr., administrator of Veterans Affairs
- Robert J. Burkhardt, assistant postmaster general for facilities
- Ralph W. Nicholson, assistant postmaster general for finance
- Frederick C. Belen, assistant postmaster general for postal operations
- James M. Quigley, assistant secretary of health, education and welfare for federal and state matters (announced January 16, 1961)
- Wilbur J. Cohen, assistant secretary of health, education, and welfare for legislative matters (announced January 16, 1961)
- Boisfeuillet Jones, assistant secretary of health, education and welfare for health and medical affairs (announced December 31, 1960)
- Kenneth Holum, assistant secretary of the interior for water and power (announced January 12, 1961)
- John A. Carver Jr., assistant secretary of the interior for public lands management (announced January 12, 1961)
- Jerry R. Holleman, assistant secretary of labor
- James J. Reynolds, assistant secretary of labor (announced January 8, 1961)
- George C. Lodge, assistant secretary of labor for international affairs incumbent officeholder
- George Leon-Paul Weaver, special assistant to the secretary of labor (announced January 8, 1961)
- Frank Barry, Department of the Interior solicitor general (announced January 12, 1961)
- Charles Donahue, Department of Labor solicitor (announced January 8, 1961)
- Alan Willcox, general counsel of the Department of Health, Education and Welfare
- Glenn T. Seaborg, chairman of the Atomic Energy Commission (announced January 16, 1961)
- Michael Monroney, United States Postal Service executive assistant for White House and congressional liaison

=== Economic policy ===
- C. Douglas Dillon, secretary of the treasury (announced December 16, 1960)
- David E. Bell, director of the Bureau of the Budget
- Elizabeth Rudel Smith, treasurer of the United States (announced December 18, 1960)
- Harry J. Anslinger, commissioner of the Federal Bureau of Narcotics incumbent officeholder
- John M. Leddy, assistant secretary of the treasury for international affairs (announced January 16, 1961)
- David E. Bell, director of the Bureau of the Budget
- Walter Heller, chair of the Council of Economic Advisers
- John E. Horne, administrator of the Small Business Administration
- Henry H. Fowler, under secretary of the treasury
- Robert Roosa, under secretary of the treasury for monetary affairs
- Elmer B. Staats, deputy director of the Bureau of the Budget incumbent officeholder
- Esther Peterson, director of the United States Women's Bureau and assistant to the Secretary of Labor (announced January 8, 1961)
- Kermit Gordon, member of the Council of Economic Advisers
- James Tobin, member of the Council of Economic Advisers
- George Docking, director of the Export-Import Bank

=== White House staff ===
- Pierre Salinger, White House press secretary (announced November 9, 1960)
- Andrew Hatcher, associate White House press secretary (announced November 9, 1960)
- Ted Sorensen, White House counsel (announced November 9, 1960)
- Kenneth O'Donnell, secretary to the president (announced November 9, 1960)
- Fred Dutton, White House Cabinet secretary
- Ralph A. Dungan, White House staff secretary
- Larry O'Brien, assistant to the president for Congressional relations
- David Powers, special assistant to the president
- James M. Landis, special assistant to the president
- Timothy Reardon, administrative assistant to the president
- Richard Neustadt, consultant on government organization

=== Other ===
- John Moore, administrator of the General Services Administration
- Bernard L. Boutin, deputy administrator of the General Services Administration
- John Macy, chairman of the Civil Service Commission

== Impact on Kennedy's presidency ==
As his transition had, Kennedy's presidential administration would come to often consult Brookings Institution briefing papers. In 1987, historian Carl M. Brauer would fault Kennedy's authorization of the failed the Bay of Pigs Invasion on Kennedy and his team having been too trusting of the bureaucratic experts in the government during his presidential transition.
