= Harrison E. Spangler =

American politician

Harrison Spangler
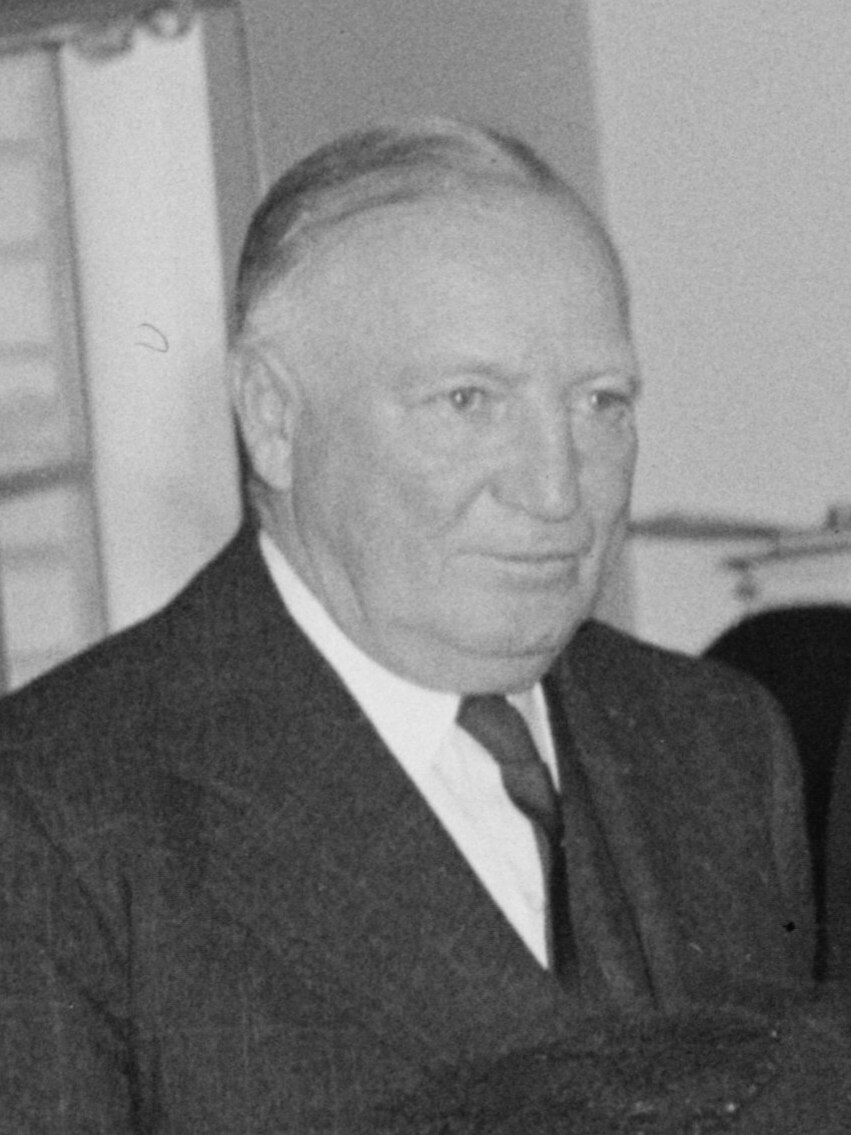

Chair of the Republican National Committee
- In office December 7, 1942 – June 30, 1944
- Preceded by: Joseph W. Martin Jr.
- Succeeded by: Herbert Brownell Jr.

Personal details
- Born: Harrison Earl Spangler; June 10, 1879 Guthrie County, Iowa, U.S.
- Died: July 28, 1965 (aged 86) Portland, Oregon, U.S.
- Party: Republican
- Education: University of Iowa (LLB)

Harrison Earl Spangler (June 10, 1879 – July 28, 1965) was a politician from the U. S. state of Iowa.

== Life and career ==
Spangler was born in Guthrie County, Iowa, and served in the U.S. Army during the Spanish–American War. He studied to be a lawyer and joined the Republican Party.

Spangler was an Iowa delegate to the 1924, 1932, 1936, 1940, 1944, 1948 and 1952 Republican National Conventions. (In 1932 he was an alternate delegate.) He was chairman of the Iowa Republican State Central Committee 1930–32. He was also a member of the Republican National Committee 1931–49 and its chairman 1942–44.

While RNC chairman in 1943, Spangler created a council concerning foreign policy for the 1944 party's platform. He wanted a unified policy among isolationists and internationalists on treaty ratification and the proposed world peace organization. The Post War Advisory Council met on September 6 on Mackinac Island, Michigan and was chaired by U.S. Senator Arthur H. Vandenberg. Other attendees were Governors Earl Warren of California, Thomas E. Dewey of New York, Harry Kelly of Michigan, Dwight H. Green of Illinois, and Senator Robert A. Taft of Ohio. The meeting resulted in clearing way for Republican congressional support of the United Nations and the North Atlantic Treaty Organization.

Spangler was a resident of Cedar Rapids, Iowa and a member of the American Bar Association, Freemasons, Elks, and Sigma Nu.

Party political offices
Preceded by Joseph W. Martin Jr.	Chair of the Republican National Committee; 1942–1944	Succeeded by Herbert Brownell Jr.
