= Herbert Brownell Jr. =

American lawyer and politician (1904–1996)

Herbert Brownell
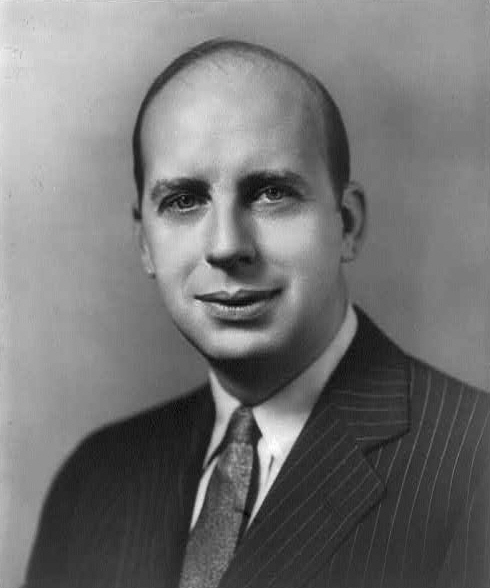
- Brownell, c. 1944

62nd United States Attorney General
- In office January 21, 1953 – October 23, 1957
- President: Dwight D. Eisenhower
- Deputy: William P. Rogers
- Preceded by: James P. McGranery
- Succeeded by: William P. Rogers

Chair of the Republican National Committee
- In office June 30, 1944 – April 1, 1946
- Preceded by: Harrison E. Spangler
- Succeeded by: B. Carroll Reece

Member of the New York State Assembly from the 10th New York district
- In office January 1, 1933 – December 31, 1937
- Preceded by: Langdon W. Post
- Succeeded by: MacNeil Mitchell

Personal details
- Born: February 20, 1904 Nemaha County, Nebraska, U.S.
- Died: May 1, 1996 (aged 92) New York City, New York, U.S.
- Party: Republican
- Spouses: Doris McCarter (m. 1934; died 1979) Marion Taylor (m. 1987; div. 1989)
- Children: 4
- Education: University of Nebraska (BA); Yale University (LLB)

Herbert Brownell Jr. (February 20, 1904 – May 1, 1996) was an American lawyer and Republican politician. From 1953 to 1957, he served as United States Attorney General in the administration of President Dwight D. Eisenhower.

== Early life and education ==
Brownell, one of the seven children of Herbert and May Miller Brownell, was born in Nemaha County, Nebraska, near the town of Peru. His father, Herbert Brownell, was a professor and author at the Peru State Normal School in education and physical sciences. After graduating Phi Beta Kappa from the University of Nebraska in 1924, and, in his senior year, being a member of the Society of Innocents, Brownell attended Yale Law School, where he was president of the Yale Law Journal, earning his law degree in 1927. While at the University of Nebraska, he joined the Delta Upsilon fraternity.

Brownell's brother, Samuel Brownell, served as U.S. Commissioner of Education from 1953 through 1956.

== Legal career ==
Brownell was admitted to the bar in New York and began his practice in New York City. In February 1929, he joined the law firm of Lord Day & Lord in New York, and except for periods of government service, he remained with them until his retirement in 1989. He married Doris McCarter on June 16, 1934. They had four children (Joan Brownell, Ann Brownell, Thomas McCarter Brownell, and James Barker Brownell) and remained together until McCarter's death on June 12, 1979. He married his second wife Marion Taylor in 1987, but the couple separated and divorced in December 1989.

His most important client was the famous Greek shipping billionaire Aristotle Onassis; immediately after the end of World War II, Onassis was eager to get his hands on the T2 tankers originally built for the wartime needs of the U.S. Navy. The tankers were eventually made available for sale, but because they were considered to have a militarily strategic value in the event of another war, they were being offered to American citizens only.

Brownell helped Onassis work out a scheme of dummy American corporations, thus allowing him to bypass the regulations and purchase the tankers through these dummy corporations. Later, as Attorney General, Brownell would be forced to switch sides under pressure from FBI Director J. Edgar Hoover, and his Justice Department would indict Onassis (eventually Onassis and the U.S. government reached a settlement).

== State political career ==
Besides his law practice, Brownell had a long and active political career as a Republican. He was a member of the New York State Assembly (New York Co., 10th district) in 1933, 1934, 1935, 1936 and 1937.

In 1942, he was the campaign manager for Thomas Dewey's election as governor of New York. He also managed Dewey's 1944 and 1948 campaigns for president. From 1944 to 1946, he was the chairman of the Republican National Committee, where he focused on modernizing it with advanced polling methods and fundraising techniques. He was credited by many as being instrumental in helping the Republicans to gain control of the US Congress in the 1946 midterm elections.

In 1952, Brownell played an important role in convincing General Dwight Eisenhower, then supreme allied commander in Europe, to run for President of the United States and worked in the Eisenhower campaign. Along with Dewey, Brownell was instrumental in Eisenhower's selection of Richard Nixon as the vice-presidential running mate.

== Attorney General ==
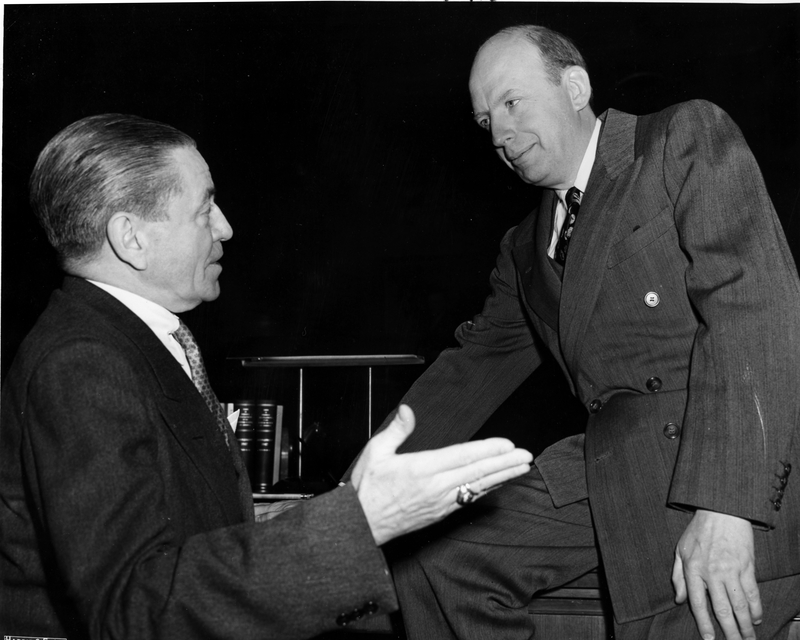
Then outgoing attorney general James P. McGranery (left) briefs Brownell, then Eisenhower's designee for the position, of the Justice Department on December 20, 1952, amid the presidential transition of Dwight D. Eisenhower

Brownell was appointed by Eisenhower as Attorney General and served from January 21, 1953, to October 23, 1957. On November 6, 1953, Brownell told members of the Chicago Executives Club, "Harry Dexter White was a Russian spy.... He smuggled secret documents to Russian agents for transmission to Moscow." At the same time, he helped the Eisenhower administration cover up the Soviet Union's involvement in the Korean War to prevent McCarthyist politicians from using it to raise popular support for a full-scale world war against the Soviet Union.

Early in his term, Brownell was involved in several landmark civil rights cases, including Brown v. Board of Education.

Although it was weakened by the US Senate, he drafted the legislative proposal that ultimately became the Civil Rights Act of 1957, the first civil rights law that was enacted since 1875. Because of his strong stance in favor of civil rights, Brownell became very unpopular in the South.

Eisenhower reluctantly decided not to nominate Brownell to the Supreme Court when vacancies occurred in 1957 and 1958, as he feared that segregationists in the Senate would fight and defeat the nomination.

Brownell stepped down as an Attorney General only after his advice had been followed in the Little Rock desegregation case. Osro Cobb, the United States Attorney for the Eastern District of Arkansas, reflects on Brownell's tenure:

...Brownell had stuck by his guns for the hard line on the integration dispute. His advice had been followed. The government was committed with no easy way to extricate itself. Many people on both sides of the controversy were becoming increasingly unhappy. I am inclined to believe that while Mr. Brownell was genuinely pleased with the policy, he was grievously disappointed that it had not achieved better results. The impasse with Governor Orval Faubus may have contributed substantially to his decision to retire. We may not get the answer until and if he writes his memoirs, but I doubt it even then because the Herbert Brownell I grew to know would not write about his personal secrets. Mr. Brownell was both praised and condemned as he departed from office....

== Later life ==
In 1965, Brownell chaired a committee to find civilians, who would serve on the first impartial Civilian Complaint Review Board of the New York City Police Department, the first such citizen oversight of police in the country.

Brownell took himself out of consideration for appointment by President Richard Nixon as Chief Justice of the United States to replace Earl Warren in 1969, the eventual replacement being Warren E. Burger.

Brownell later served as the United States representative to the Permanent Court of Arbitration in The Hague and from 1972 to 1974, he was special U.S. envoy to Mexico for negotiations over the Colorado River.

In addition to many honors and other civic roles, Brownell was also President of the New York City Bar Association in 1982. From 1986 to 1989 he served on the Commission for the Bicentennial of the United States Constitution. He died of cancer at the New York Hospital Cornell-Medical Center in Manhattan, New York, at 92.

== Sources ==
- Herbert Brownell and John P. Burke; Advising Ike: The Memoirs of Attorney General Herbert Brownell; 1993, University of Kansas Press; ISBN 0-7006-0590-8.

New York State Assembly
Preceded by Langdon W. Post	Member of the New York Assembly from the 10th district 1933–1937	Succeeded by MacNeil Mitchell
Party political offices
Preceded by Harrison E. Spangler	Chair of the Republican National Committee; 1944–1946	Succeeded by B. Carroll Reece
Legal offices
Preceded by James P. McGranery	United States Attorney General; 1953–1957	Succeeded by William P. Rogers
