= Emmet John Hughes =

American journalist

Emmet John Hughes (December 26, 1920 – September 18, 1982) was a foreign bureau chief for and article editor for Time-Life and an aide and speechwriter for U.S. President Dwight D. Eisenhower. His is also known for his 1962 memoir The Ordeal of Power, a scathing review that questioned Eisenhower's political smarts and depicted Eisenhower as ill-suited for the White House.

== Career ==
Hughes was born on December 26, 1920, in Newark, New Jersey. Throughout his life, he was a devout Catholic.

After serving in the U.S. Army from 1942 to 1946, Hughes first worked as a press attaché at the United States Embassy in Spain. He thereafter was the bureau chief in Rome for Time-Life International in 1947 then in Berlin in 1948. The following year he transferred to New York where he was the editor for Life magazine (1949-1953), the special European correspondent (1953-1956), the editor of Fortune magazine (1956-1957), and the chief foreign correspondent (1957-1960).

He was later a Newsweek columnist and editorial consultant (1963-1968).

During the Eisenhower administration, Hughes was an aide to and speechwriter for the president. Hughes wrote Eisenhower's "I shall go to Korea" speech, which helped solidify the 1952 election. Hughes then accompanied the president-elect on the promised trip to Korea.

After criticizing the Eisenhower administration in the late 1950s, Hughes published The Ordeal of Power. This break with Eisenhower led Hughes to begin a new relationship as the political advisor for the Rockefeller family, and worked as a political advisor and speechwriter for Governor Nelson Rockefeller during his unsuccessful presidential bid in 1968.

In 1969, he was asked to give the first John Courtney Murray Lecture sponsored by America.

From 1970 until his death, Hughes served as professor of political science at the Eagleton Institute of Politics at Rutgers University.

Hughes graduated summa cum laude from Princeton University in 1941. He was a member of Phi Beta Kappa. His first year of graduate studies at Columbia University was cut short by World War II.

Hughes had a son (John) with his first wife Mariefrances Pfeiffer, two daughters (Mary Larkin and Kathleen Freeman) with Eileen Lanouette, and two more daughters (Caitlin and Johanna) with Katherine Nouri. Hughes died in his home in Princeton, New Jersey.

== Books written by Hughes ==
- America The Vincible (1959)
- Report from Spain (1947)
- The Ordeal of Power: A Political Memoir of the Eisenhower Years (1963)
- The Living Presidency: The Resources and Dilemmas of the American Presidential Office (1973)
- The Church and the Liberal Society (1944)

== Quotes ==
- "As an intellectual, he bestowed upon the games of golf and bridge all the enthusiasm and perseverance that he withheld from his books and ideas." - Hughes on Eisenhower
