= Inauguration of Calvin Coolidge =

Inauguration of Calvin Coolidge may refer to:

- First inauguration of Calvin Coolidge, an intra-term inauguration held in 1923 after the death of Warren G. Harding
- Second inauguration of Calvin Coolidge, a regular scheduled inauguration held in 1925
- Inauguration of Warren G. Harding, in which he inaugurated as vice president in 1921
