= Laurin L. Henry =

American academic (1921–2025)

- Born: May 23, 1921; Kankakee, Illinois, U.S.
- Died: April 11, 2025 (aged 103)
- Occupations: Academic; researcher; consultant; educator
- Years active: 1950–1995
- Employers: Public Administration Clearing House (staff assistant); Brookings Institution (senior research associate / senior staff; 1955–1964); University of Virginia (professor of government and foreign affairs; 1964–1978); Virginia Commonwealth University (dean, School of Community and Public Affairs, 1978–1986; professor thereafter); Federal Executive Institute (consultant); Johns Hopkins University (visiting professor)
- Known for: Expertise on United States presidential transitions; author of *Presidential Transitions* (1960)
- Awards: Leonard D. White Award (1961); Albert Nelson Marquis Lifetime Achievement (2018)

Academic background
- Education: DePauw University (B.A., 1942); University of Chicago (M.A., 1948; Ph.D., 1960)
- Military career
- Service years: 1942–1946
- Rank: Chief Petty Officer
- Conflicts: World War II

Laurin Luther Henry (May 23, 1921 – April 11, 2025) was an American academic. He worked as a researcher, consultant and educator. He was considered an expert on the subject of United States presidential transitions.

== Early life and education ==
Henry was born in Kankakee, Illinois, on May 23, 1921. He earned his bachelor's degree from DePauw University, graduating in 1942 with honors. After serving in the U.S. Navy from 1942 to 1946, he received his Master of Arts and Ph.D. in philosophy from the University of Chicago in 1948 and 1960, respectively. He was affiliated with Phi Beta Kappa and Phi Kappa Phi.

== Military service ==
During World War II, Henry served in the United States Navy. He was stationed at a base in northern Idaho, where he served as an administrative specialist. He rose to the rank of chief petty officer. His service lasted three and a half years, from 1942 through 1946.

== Career ==
Henry worked as a staff assistant at the Public Administration Clearing House in Chicago and Washington, DC, from 1950 to 1955. He left this job to work for the Brookings Institution independent research institute, where he worked from 1955 through 1964. He worked first as a senior research associate, before becoming a senior staff member in 1961.

Henry was regarded as an expert on United States presidential transitions. In 1960, Henry became involved in the Brookings Institution's work assessing United States presidential transitions. He was the primary research associate for the Brookings Institution 1960 - 1961 Study on Presidential Transition. This study saw its discussions attended by liaisons from the Dwight D. Eisenhower White House and the campaigns of 1960 major party presidential nominees John F. Kennedy and Richard Nixon. It, ultimately, helped to inform the presidential transition of John F. Kennedy. In addition to contributing to various publications, Henry wrote Presidential Transitions in 1960 and The Presidential Election and Transition, 1960 – 1961 in 1961 (the latter being written in collaboration with P.T. David). His 1960 book has been regarded as the first systemic study of United States presidential transitions, and would remain the only such book for quite some time. In his own 1986 book on United States presidential transitions, historian Carl M. Bauer opined that Henry's Presidential Transitions had previously been the only book on the topic "to treat them systematically". In 1961, his doctoral dissertation on the subject received the Leonard D. White Award.

From 1964 through 1978, Henry was a professor of government and foreign affairs at the University of Virginia. From 1978 through 1986, he was the dean of the School of Community of Public Affairs at Virginia Commonwealth University. After this, he spent two years as a professor at Virginia Commonwealth University, before becoming a professor emeritus in 1987. From 1988 through 1995, he would be a guest scholar at the University of Virginia and a visiting professor at Johns Hopkins University.

Henry worked at the Federal Executive Institute, where he worked to prepare executives for top-level jobs in civil service. He also, in this job, worked as a consultant for numerous federal agencies, such as the Bureau of the Budget, General Accounting Office, and NASA. Henry also served as a consultant to the Alaska State Commission.

Henry was a fellow of the National Academy of Public Administration. Henry was affiliated with the Network of Schools of Public Policy Affairs and Administration, at one time serving as its president. He was also a contributor and board member of the Inter-University Case Program, producing materials for educating on the subject public administration that have been described as "pioneering". In 2018, he was given the Albert Nelson Marquis Lifetime Achievement award.

== Personal life and death ==
Henry was married to Kathleen Jane Stephan and had two children. His wife died, leaving him a widower.

As of March 2019, Henry lived in Charlottesville, Virginia. He died in Charlottesville on April 11, 2025, at the age of 103.
