= 2000 Veepstakes =

2000 Veepstakes may refer to:

- 2000 Democratic Party vice presidential candidate selection
- 2000 Republican Party vice presidential candidate selection
