= 2004 Democratic Party vice presidential candidate selection =

2004 Democratic vice presidential nomination
- July 6, 2004
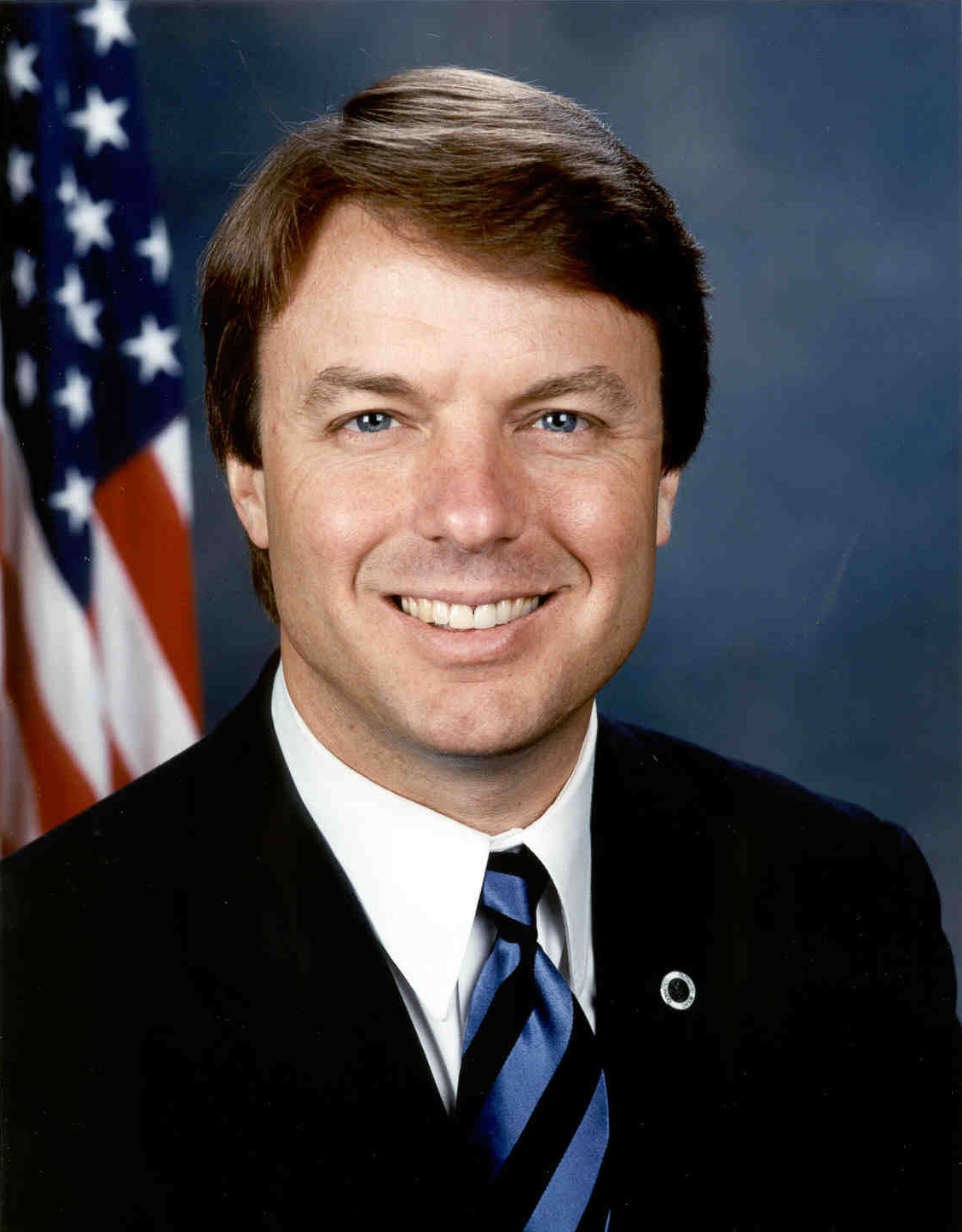
Nominee	John Edwards
Home state	North Carolina
Previous Vice Presidential nominee
Joe Lieberman
Vice Presidential nominee
John Edwards

On March 2, 2004, Massachusetts Senator John Kerry became the presumptive Democratic nominee for president in the 2004 Presidential Election. Kerry selected North Carolina Senator John Edwards as his running mate on July 6, 2004. The Kerry–Edwards ticket was ultimately defeated by the Bush–Cheney ticket in the general election. Edwards had already chose not to run for a second term, however, he returned to the Senate following the campaign but left politics less than two months later.

== Selection process ==
The vice presidential selection process was led by James Johnson, former chief executive officer of Fannie Mae and Chairman of Walter Mondale's 1984 Presidential Campaign. Kerry, who had been considered by Al Gore in 2000 as a potential running mate, sought to ensure that the selection process was discreet. To evade reporters, Kerry interviewed Edwards at former Secretary of State Madeline Albright's home in Washington D.C. Alyssa Mastromonaco, who would later serve as White House Deputy Chief of Staff under President Barack Obama, organized Kerry's meetings with the candidates.

=== Reported shortlist ===
Pundits and those close to the Kerry campaign indicated that candidates narrowed to five potential choices.

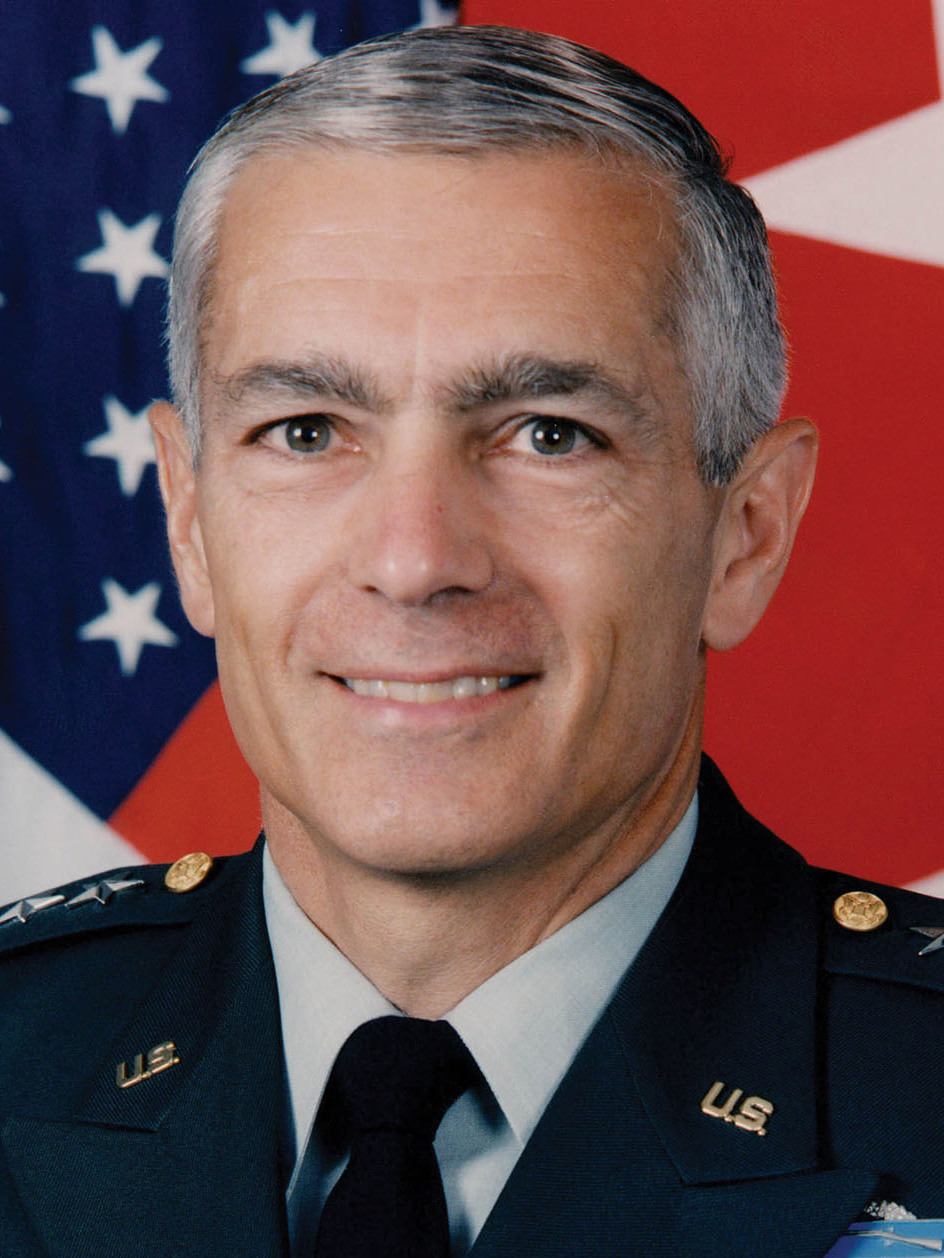
Retired Army General and 2004 presidential candidate
Wesley Clark
from Arkansas

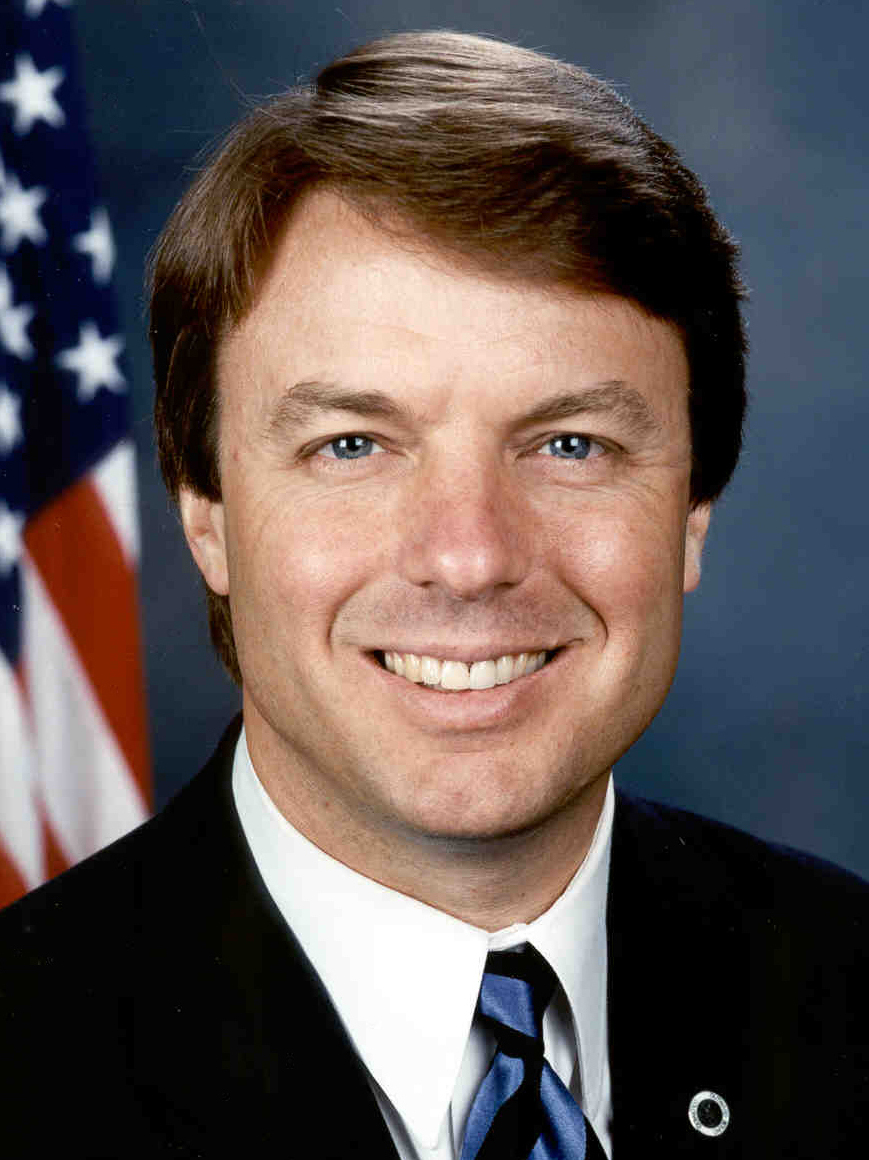
Senator and 2004 presidential candidate
John Edwards
from North Carolina
(1999–2005)

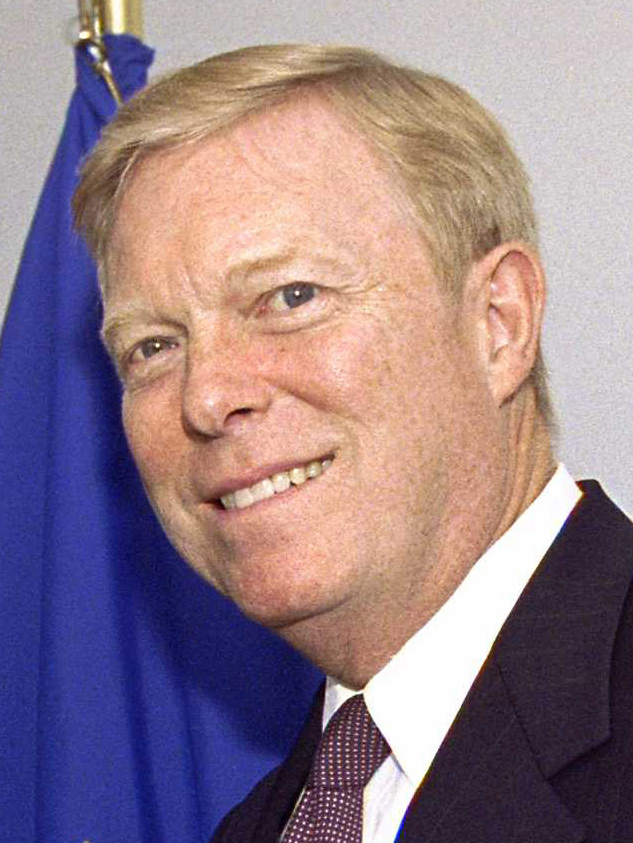
Representative and 2004 presidential candidate
Dick Gephardt
from Missouri
(1977–2005)

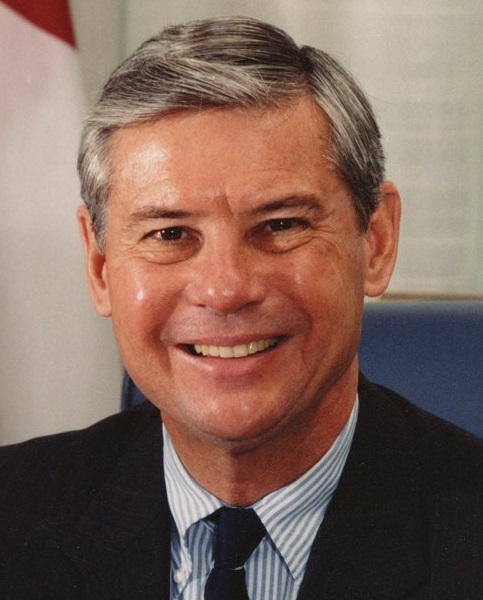
Senator and 2004 presidential candidate
Bob Graham
from Florida
(1987–2005)

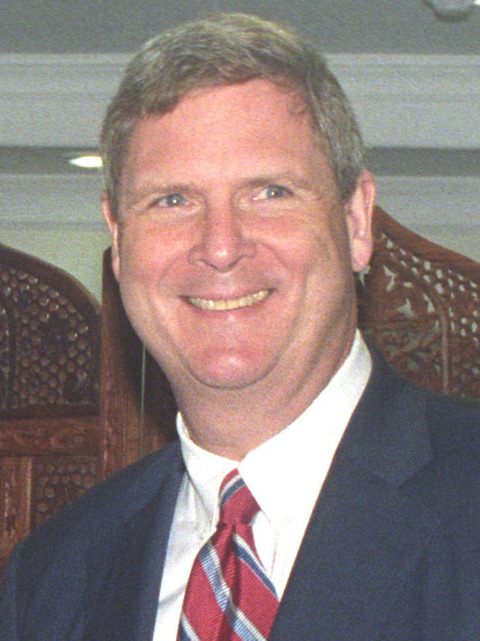
Governor
Tom Vilsack
of Iowa
(1999–2007)

== Announcement ==
The night before the campaign's announcement of the selection of Edwards, the information was leaked by an airport worker who saw Edwards's name being painted on Kerry's plane. On July 6, the Kerry campaign sent an e-mail message to his supporters at about 8:15 a.m. EDT informing them of the choice, and made the formal announcement at 9 a.m. EDT in Pittsburgh, Pennsylvania.

== Media speculation on possible vice presidential candidates ==
=== Members of Congress ===
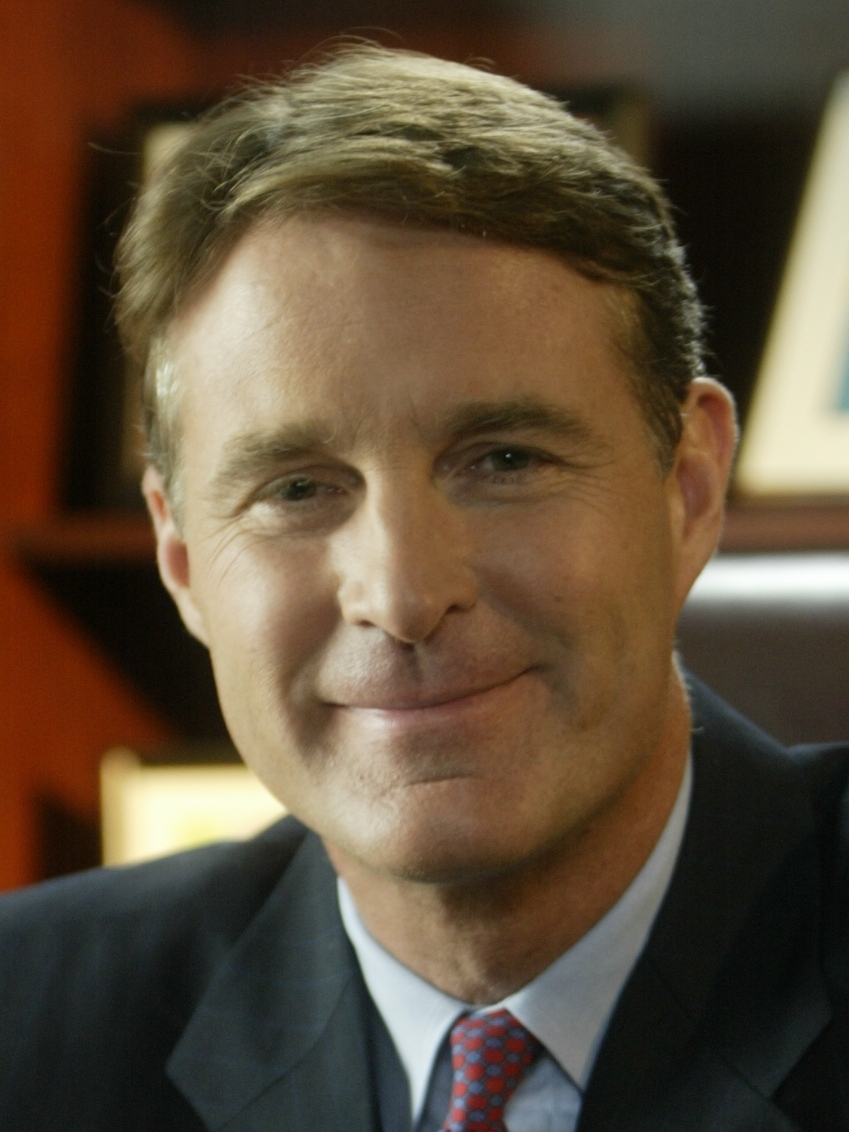
Senator
Evan Bayh
from Indiana
(1999–2011)

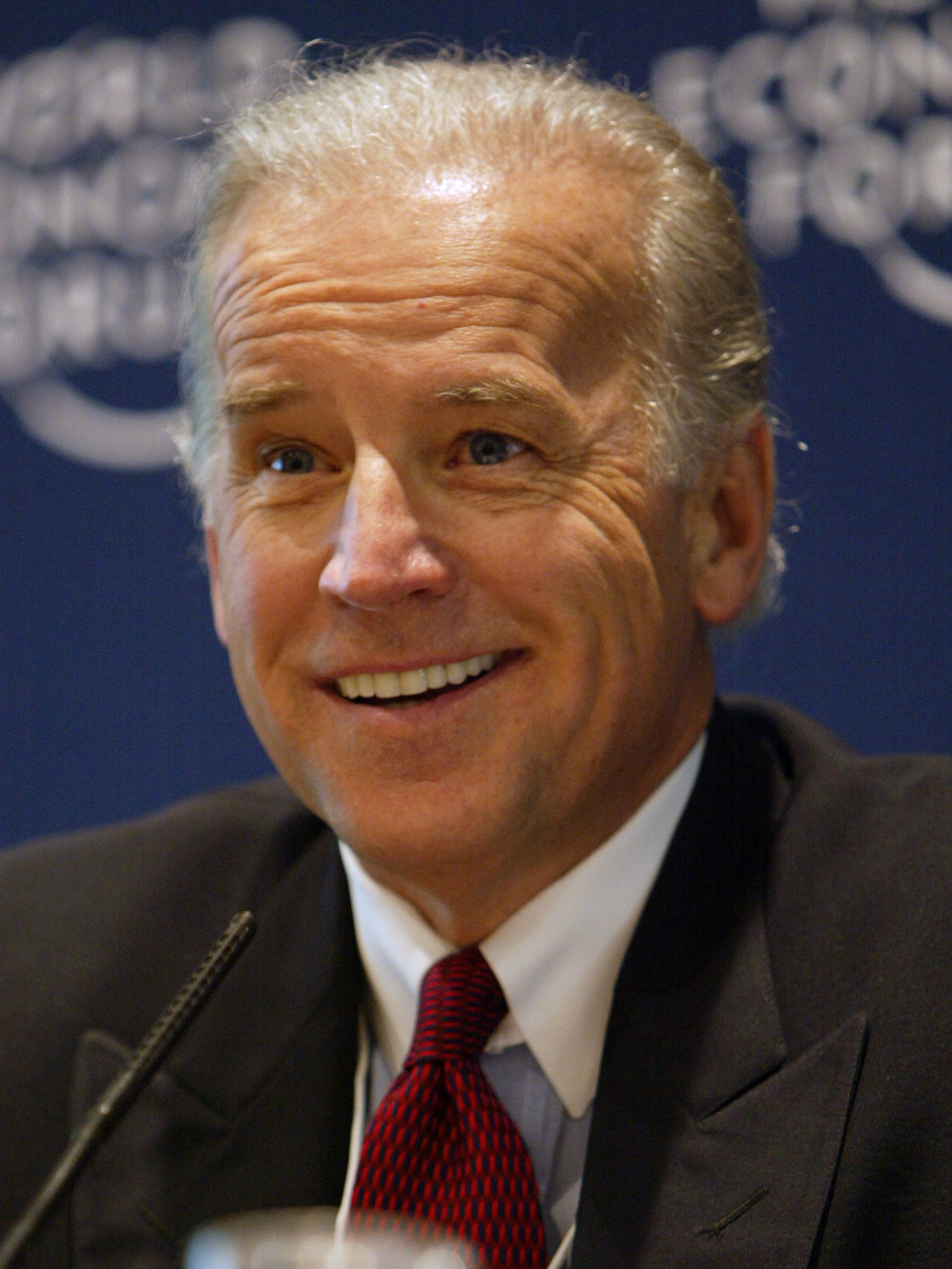
Senator and 1988 presidential candidate
Joe Biden
from Delaware
(1973–2009) (Note: Would be later chosen to become the 2008 Democratic vice president nominee.)

Former Senator and 2000 presidential candidate
Bill Bradley
from New Jersey
(1979–1997)

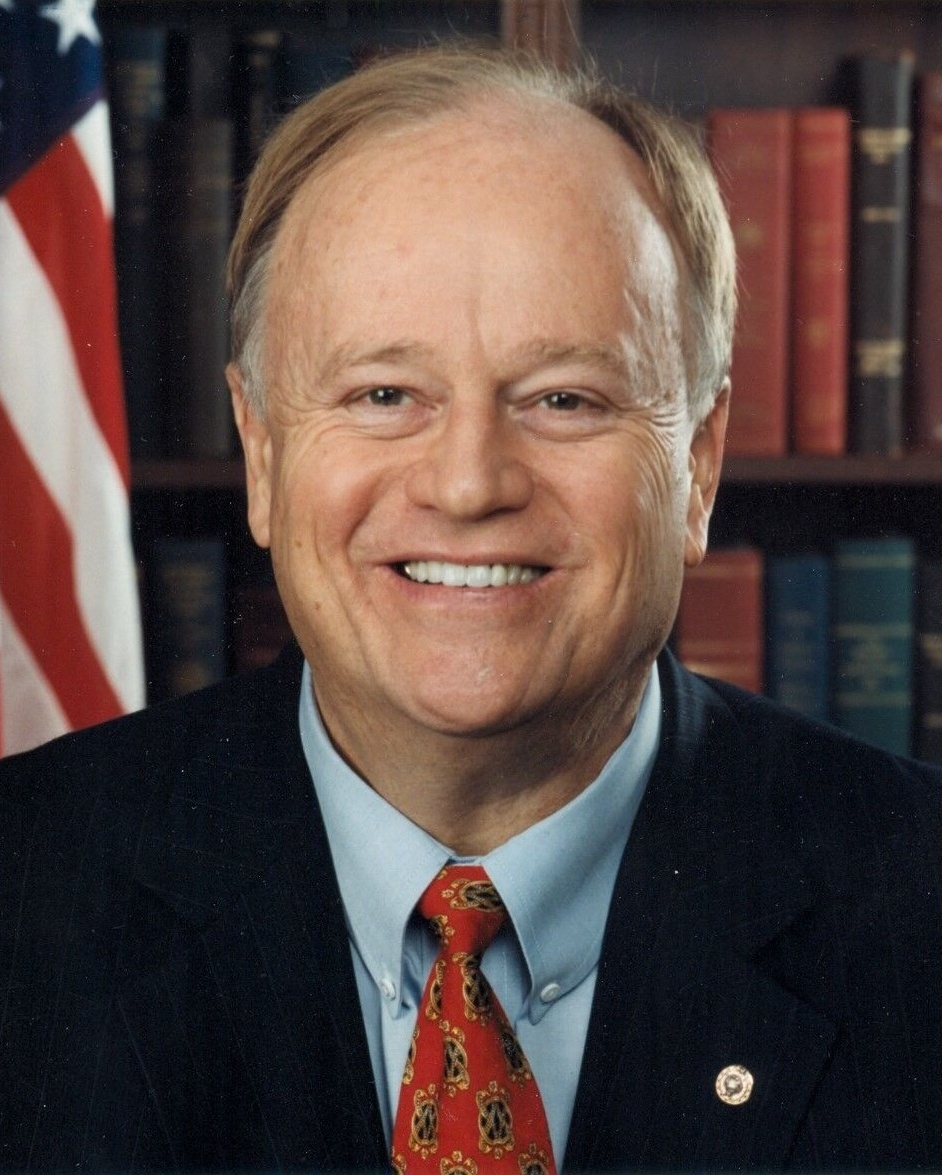
Former Senator
Max Cleland
from Georgia
(1997–2003)

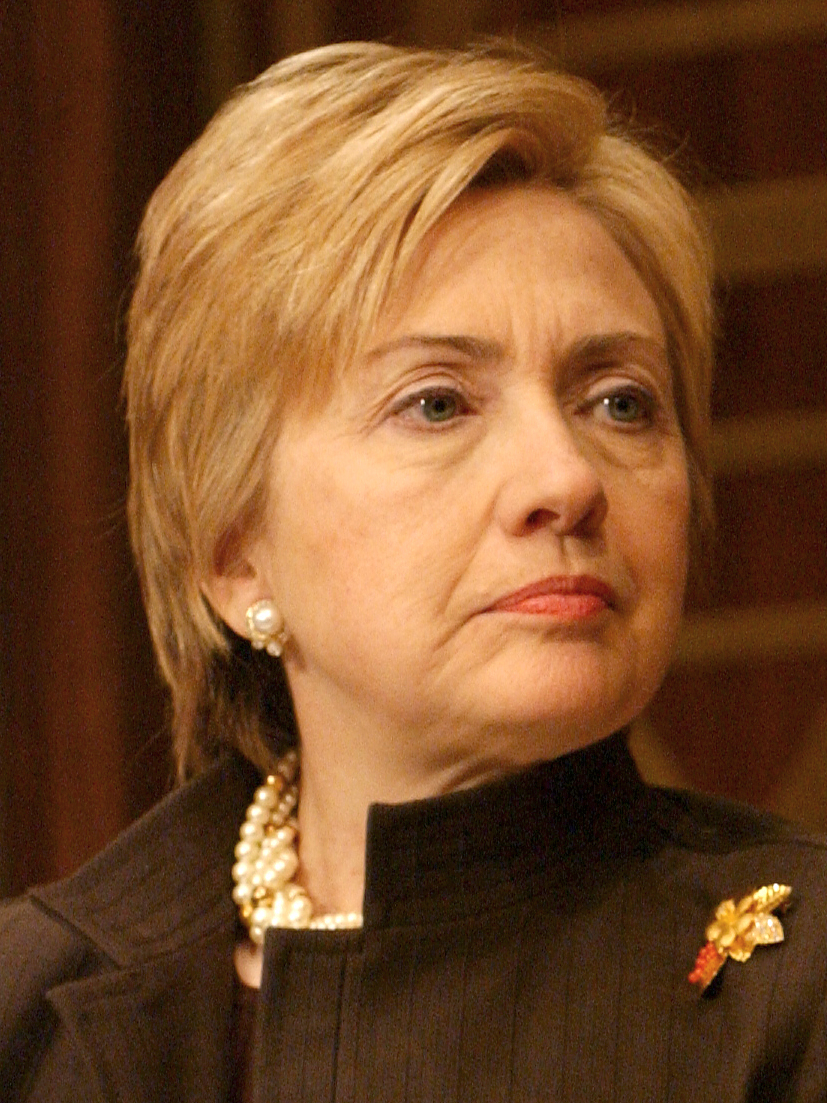
Senator
Hillary Clinton
from New York
(2001–2009)

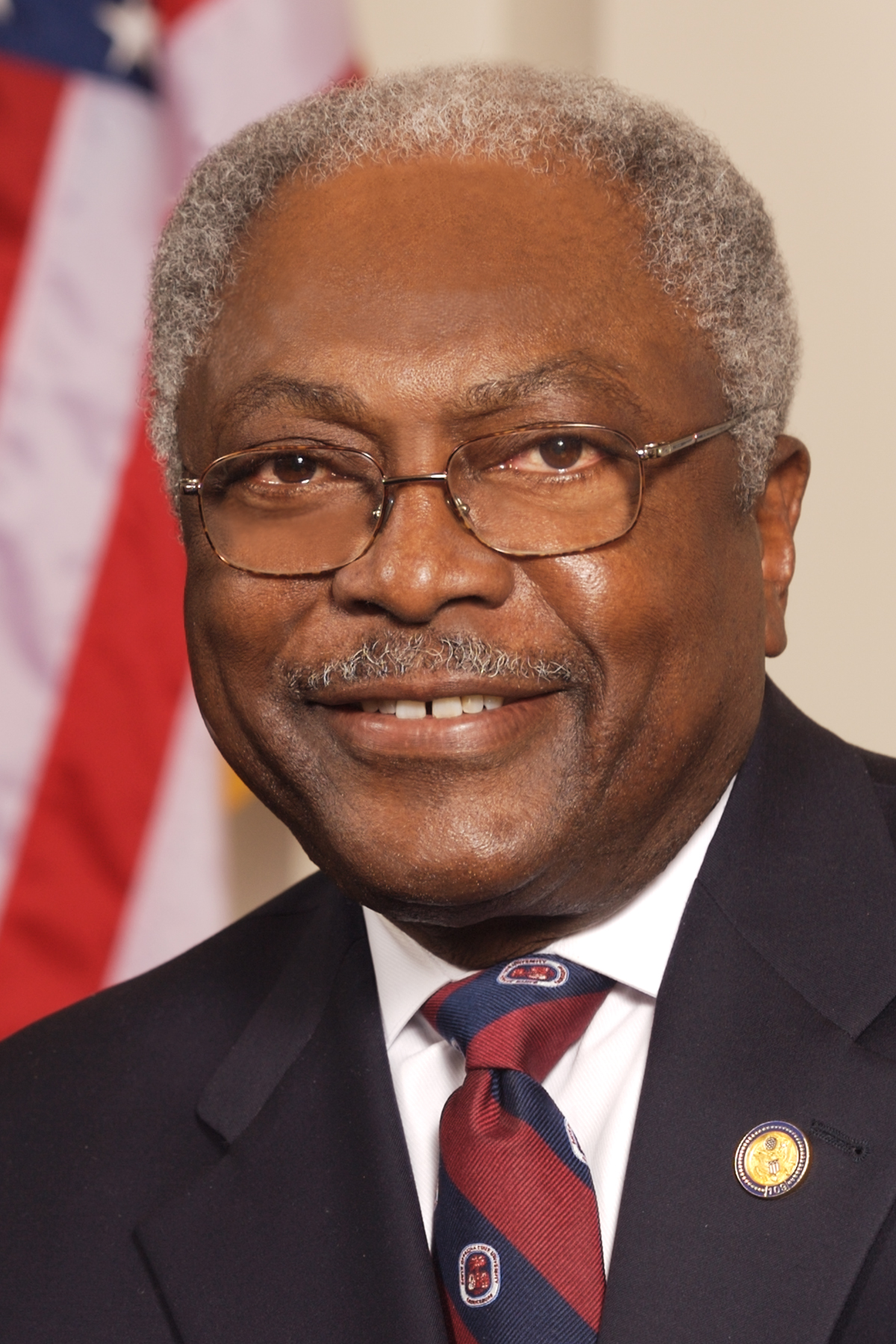
Representative
Jim Clyburn
from South Carolina
(1993–present)

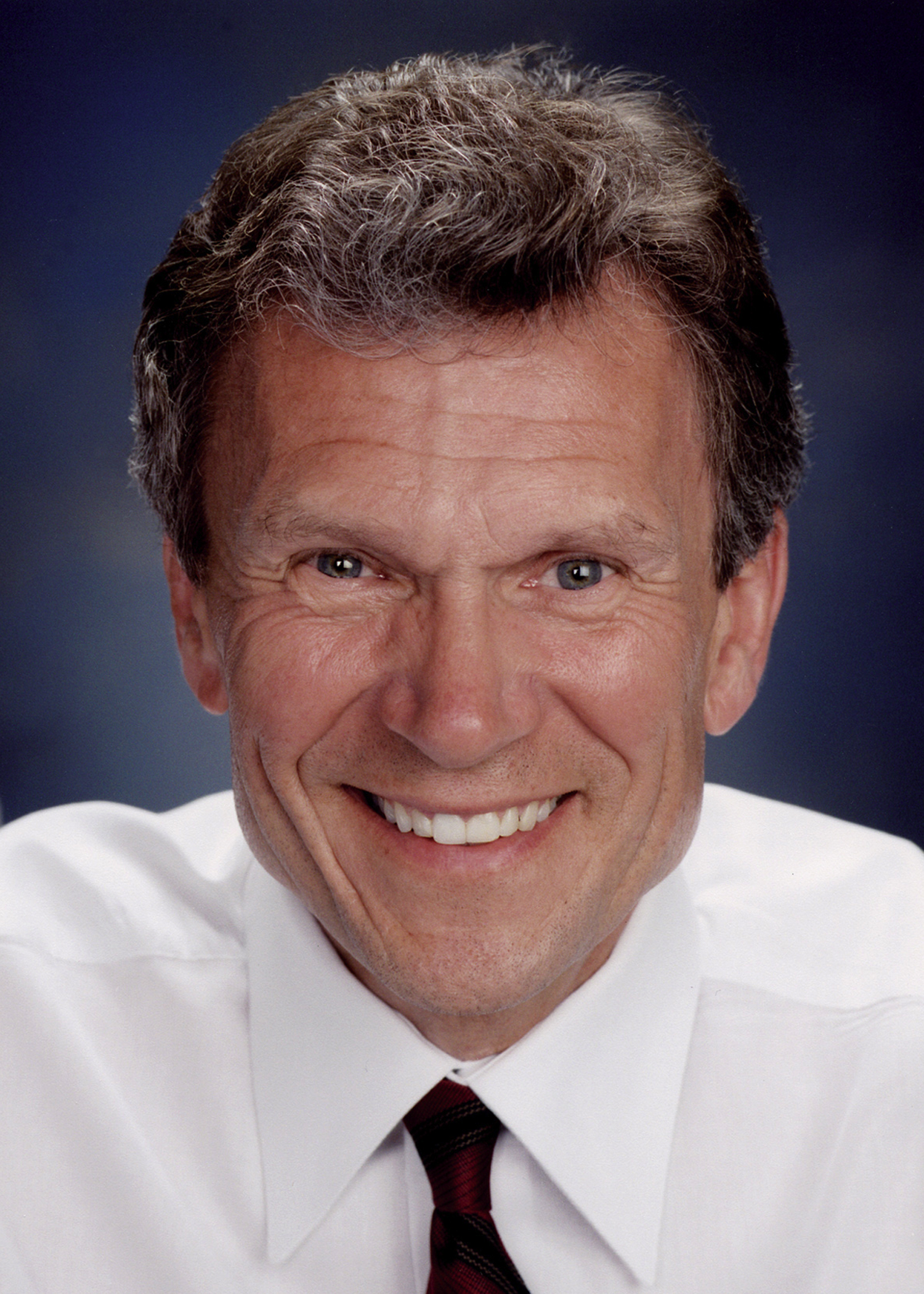
Senator
Tom Daschle
from South Dakota
(1987–2005)

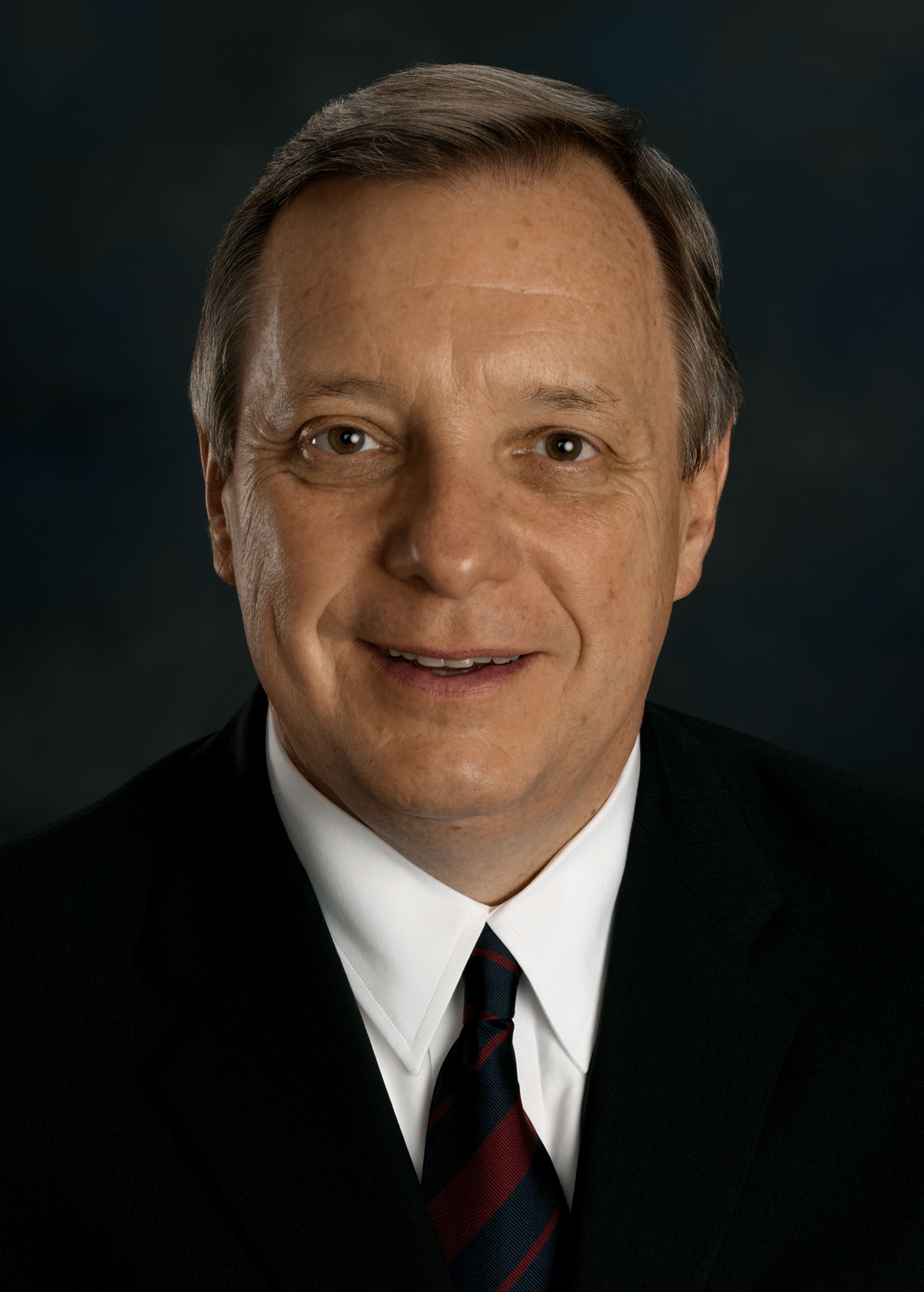
Senator
Dick Durbin
from Illinois
(1997–present)

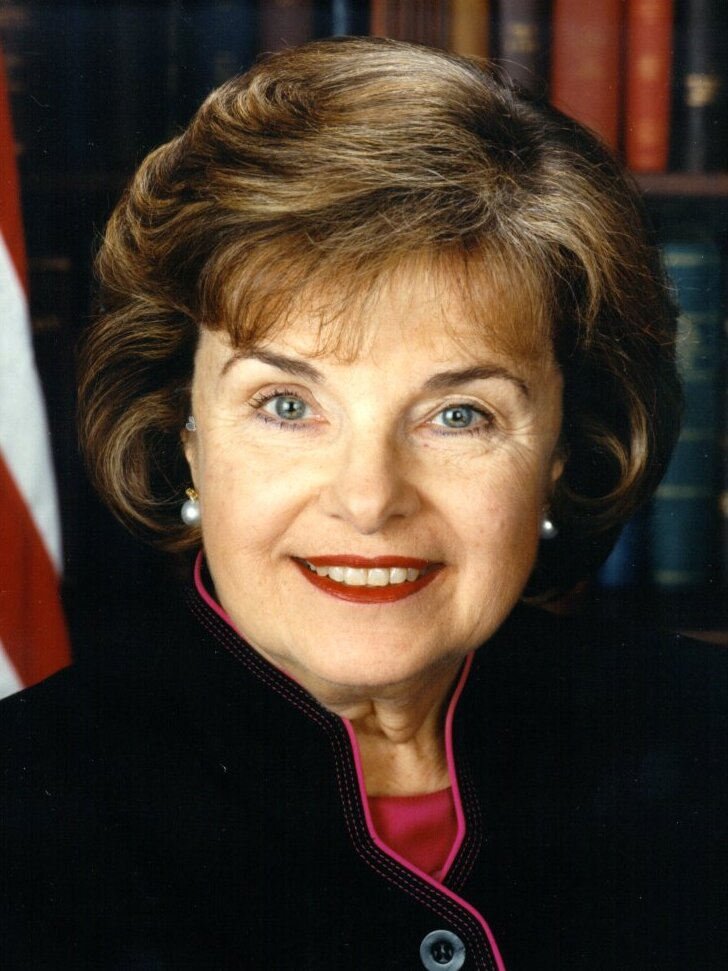
Senator
Dianne Feinstein
from California
(1992–2023)

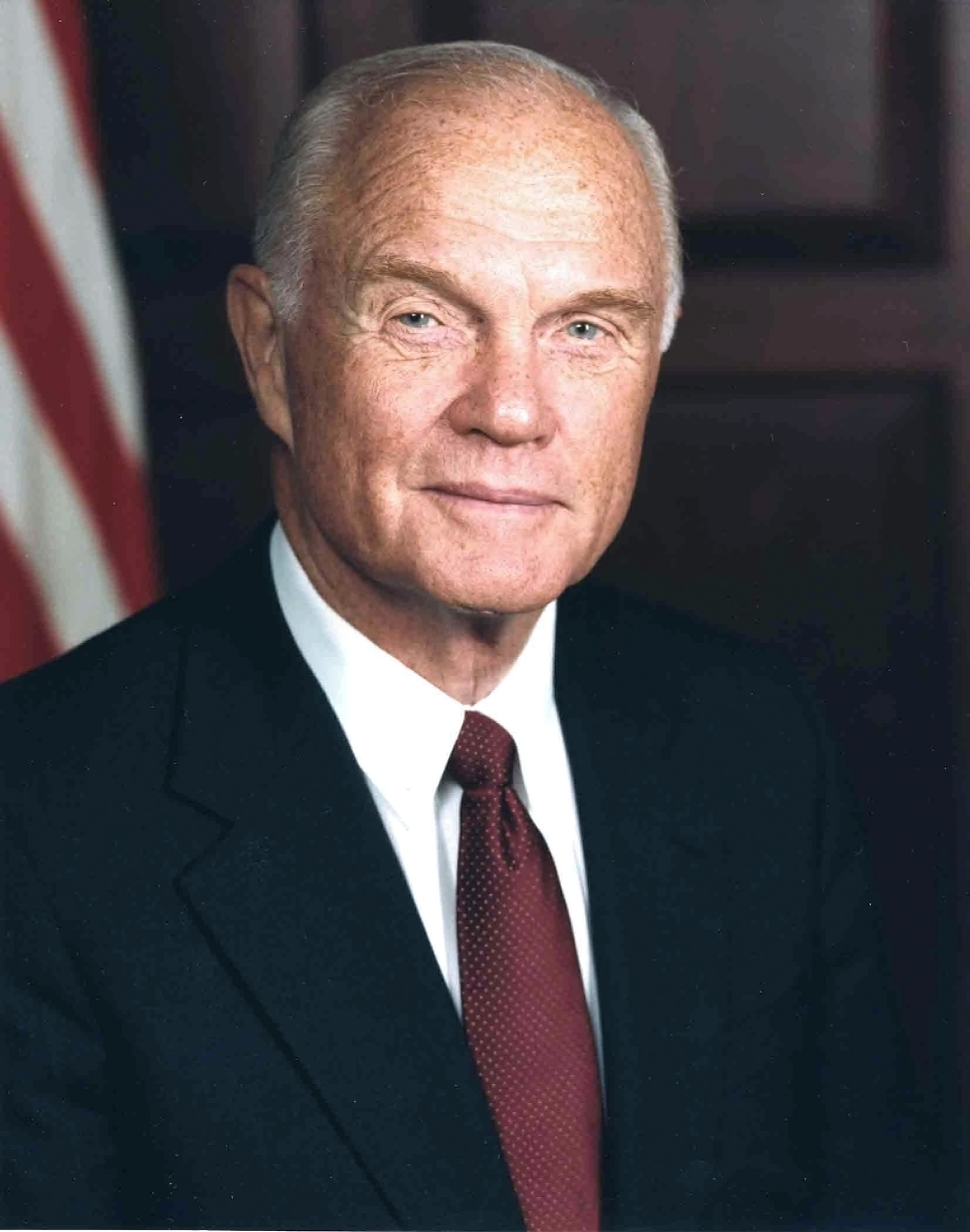
Former Senator and 1984 presidential candidate
John Glenn
from Ohio
(1974–1999)

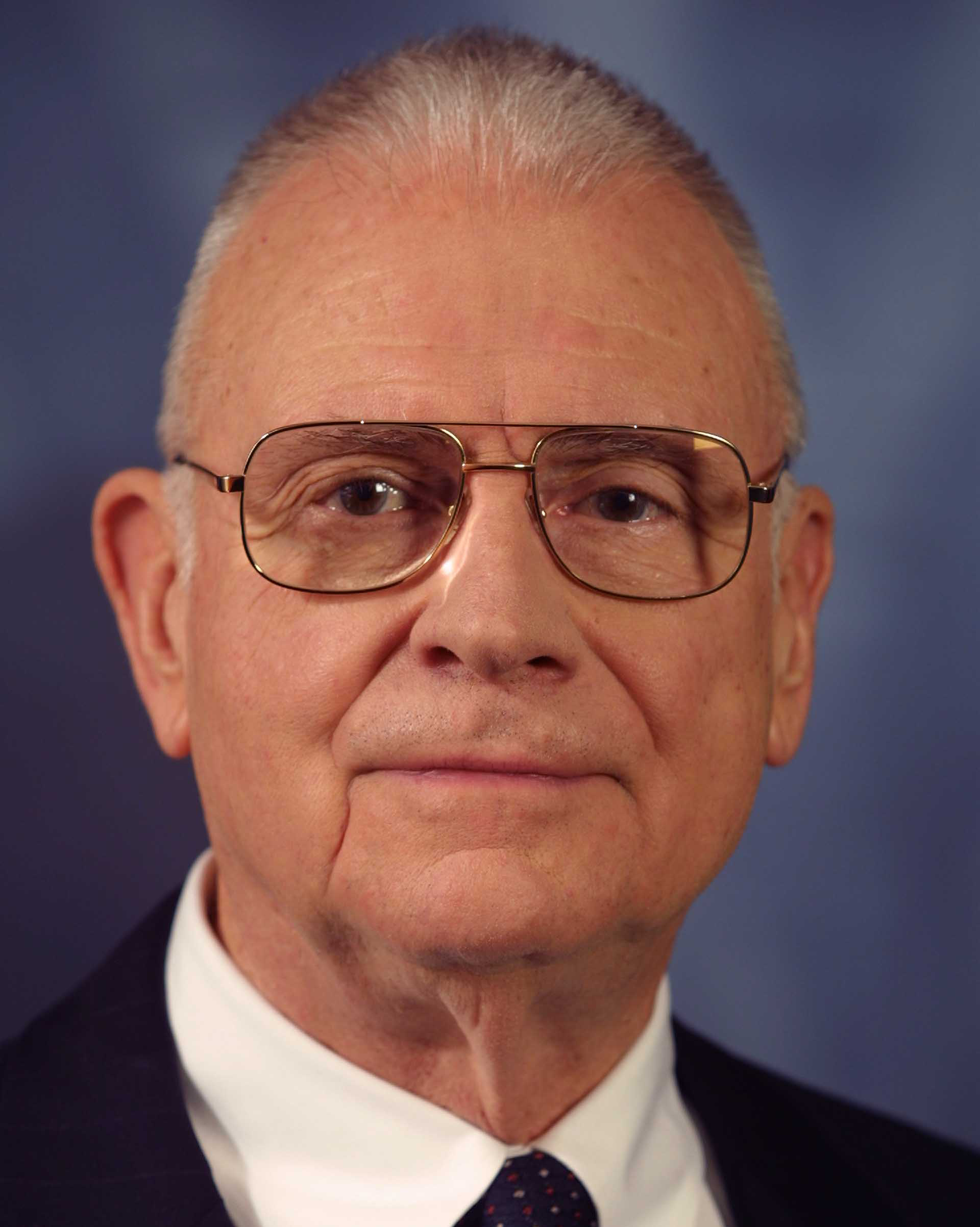
Former Representative
Lee H. Hamilton
from Indiana
(1965–1999)

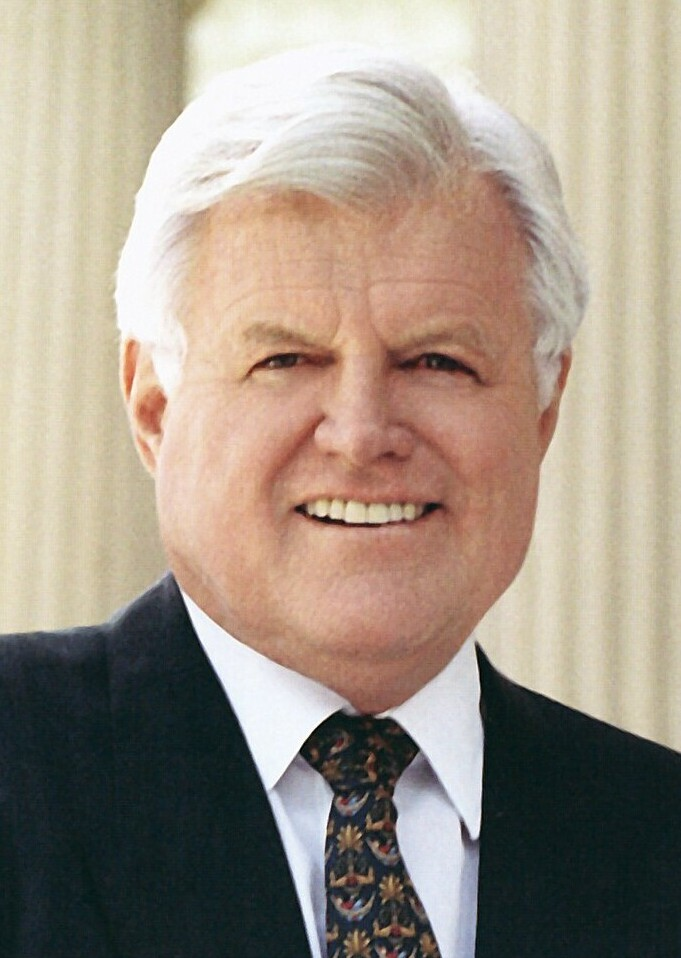
Senator and 1980 presidential candidate
Ted Kennedy
from Massachusetts
(1962–2009)

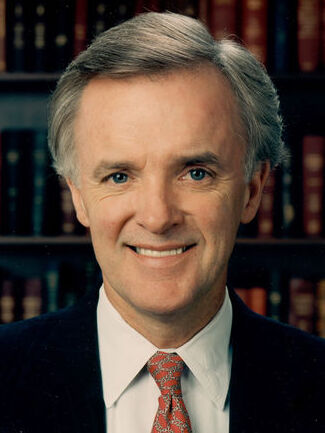
Former Senator and 1992 presidential candidate
Bob Kerrey
from Nebraska
(1989–2001)

Senator
Mary Landrieu
from Louisiana
(1997–2015)

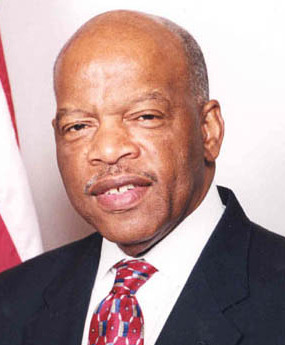
Representative
John Lewis
from Georgia
(1987–2020)

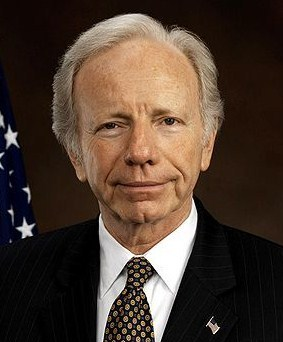
Senator, former vice presidential nominee, and 2004 presidential candidate
Joe Lieberman
from Connecticut
(1989–2013)

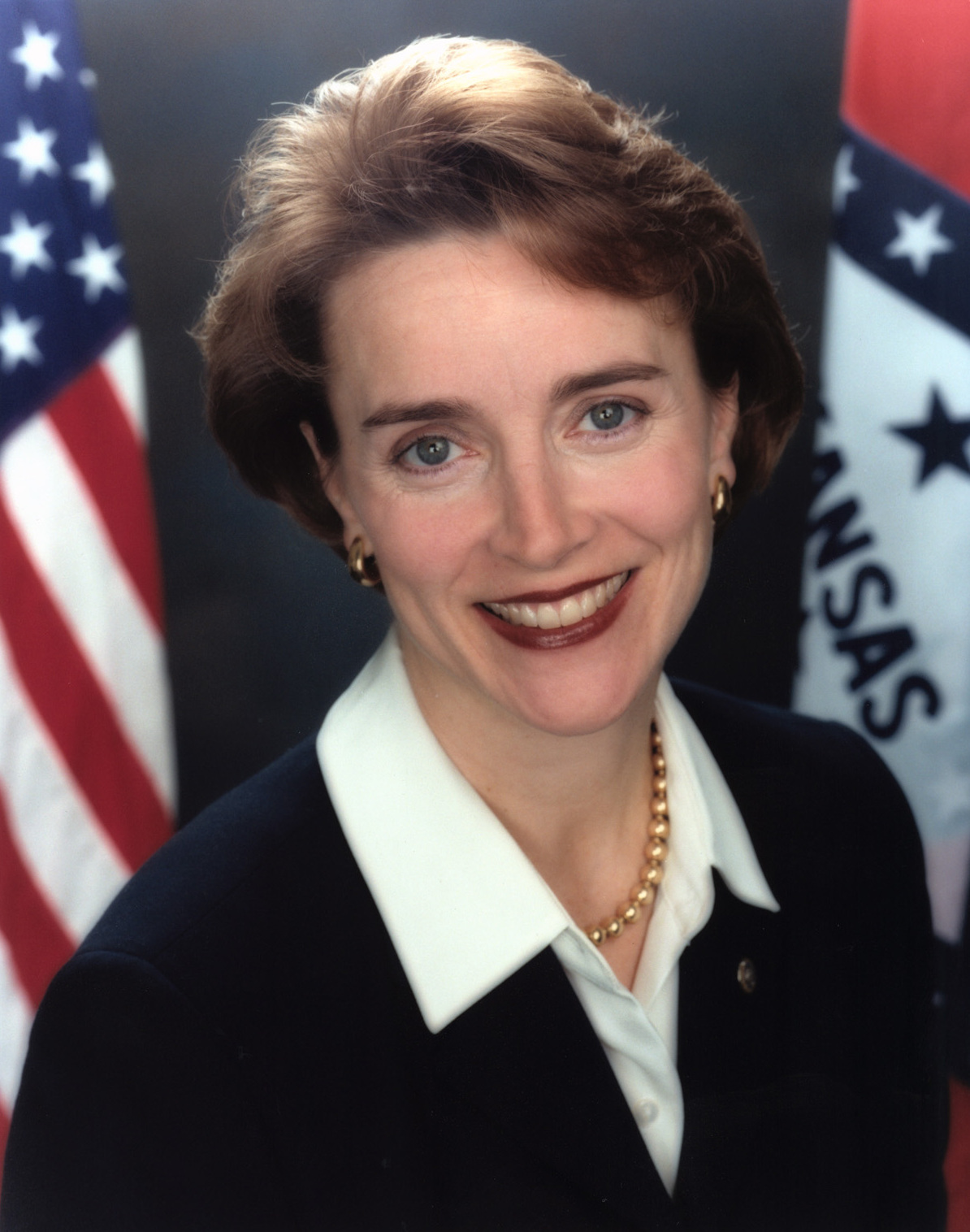
Senator
Blanche Lincoln
from Arkansas
(1999–2011)

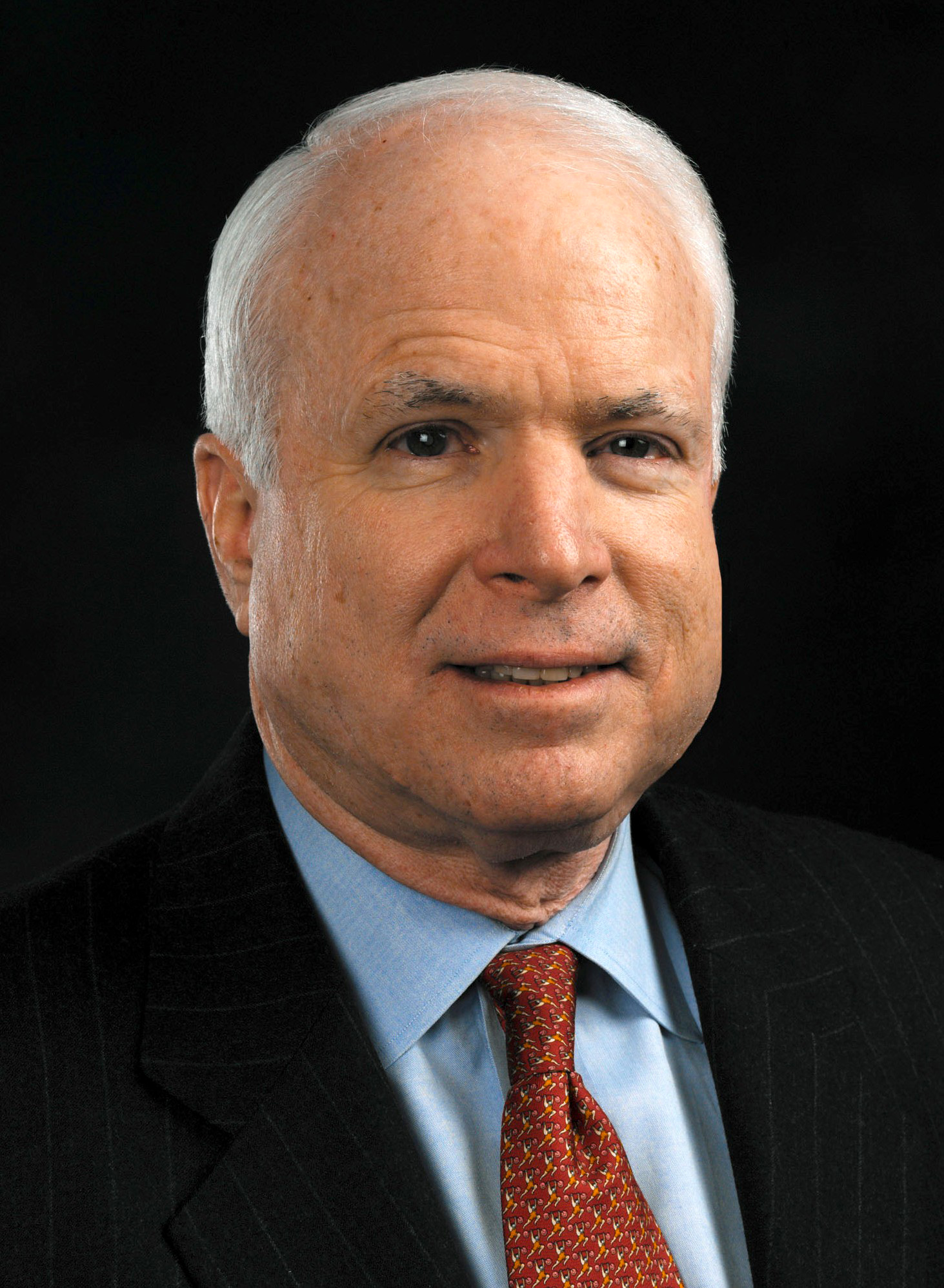
Republican Senator and 2000 Republican presidential candidate
John McCain
from Arizona
(1987–2018)

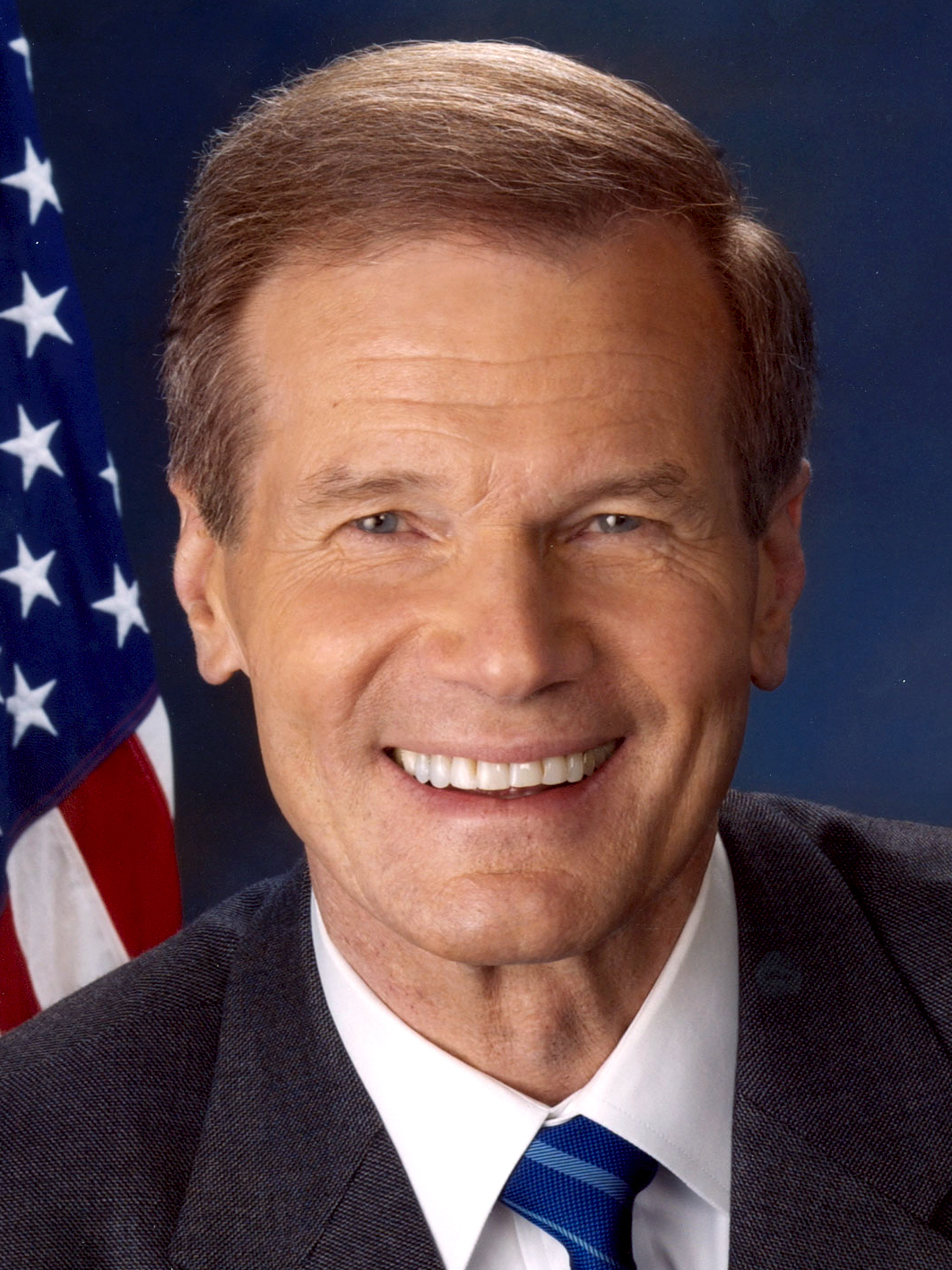
Senator
Bill Nelson
from Florida
(2001–2019)

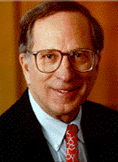
Senator
Sam Nunn
from Georgia
(1972–1997)

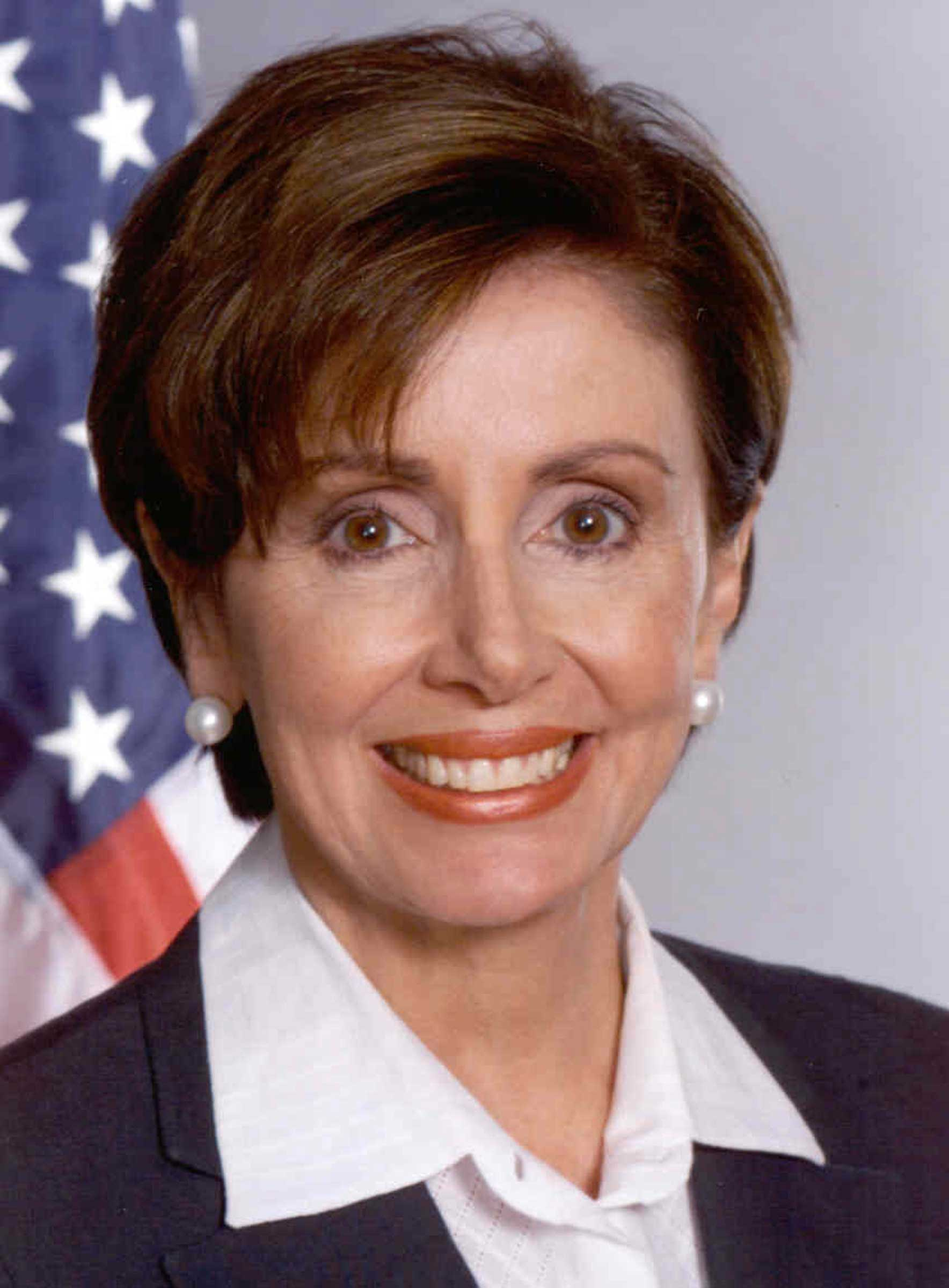
Representative and House Minority Leader
Nancy Pelosi
from California
(1987–2023)

=== Governors ===
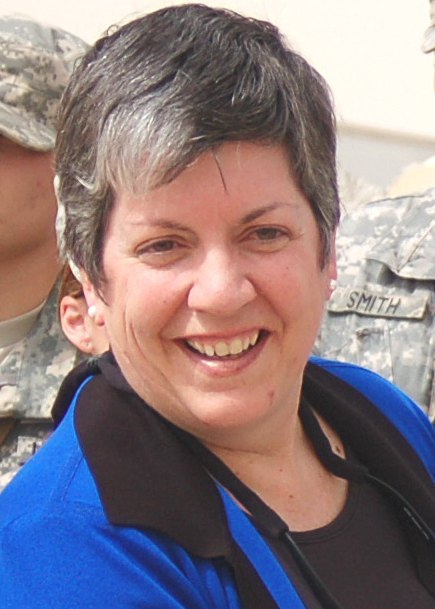
Janet Napolitano
of Arizona
(2003–2009)

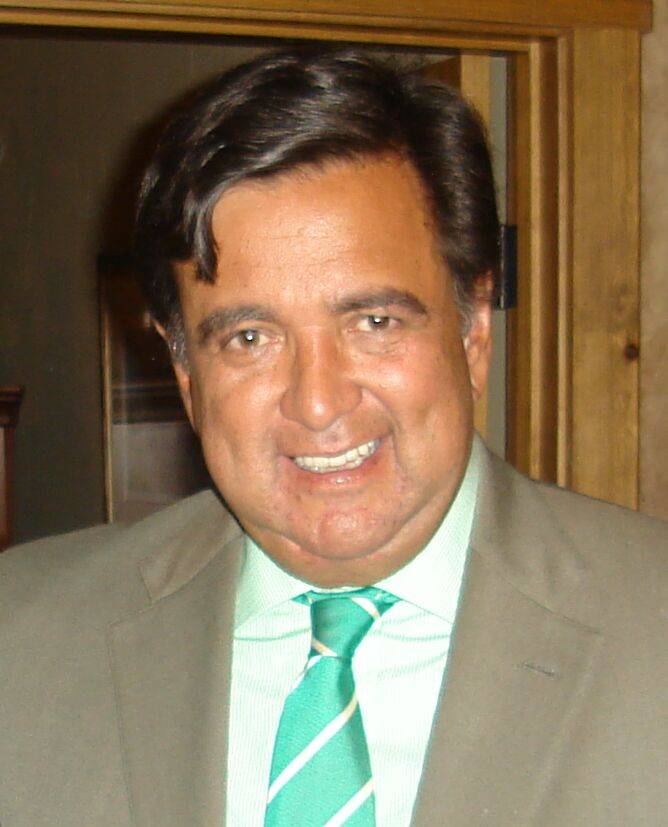
Bill Richardson
of New Mexico
(2003–2011)

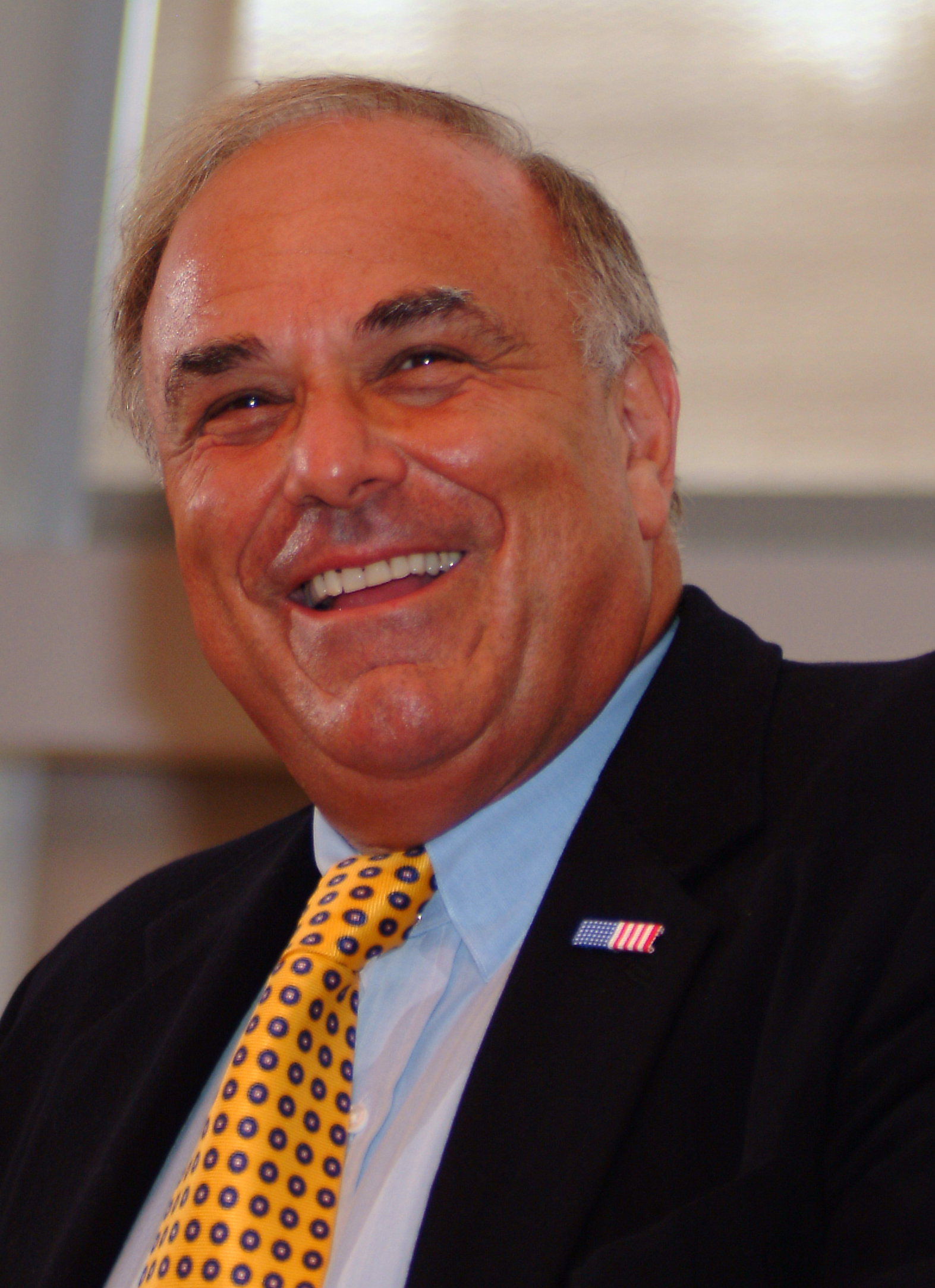
Ed Rendell
of Pennsylvania
(2003–2011)

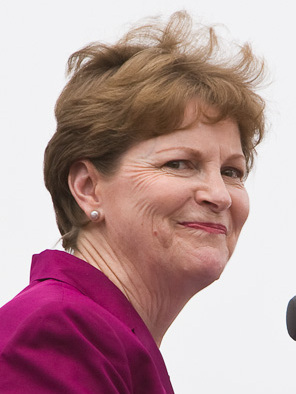
Jeanne Shaheen
of New Hampshire
(1997–2003)

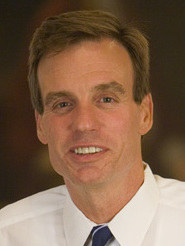
Mark Warner
of Virginia
(2002–2006)

=== Federal executive branch officials ===
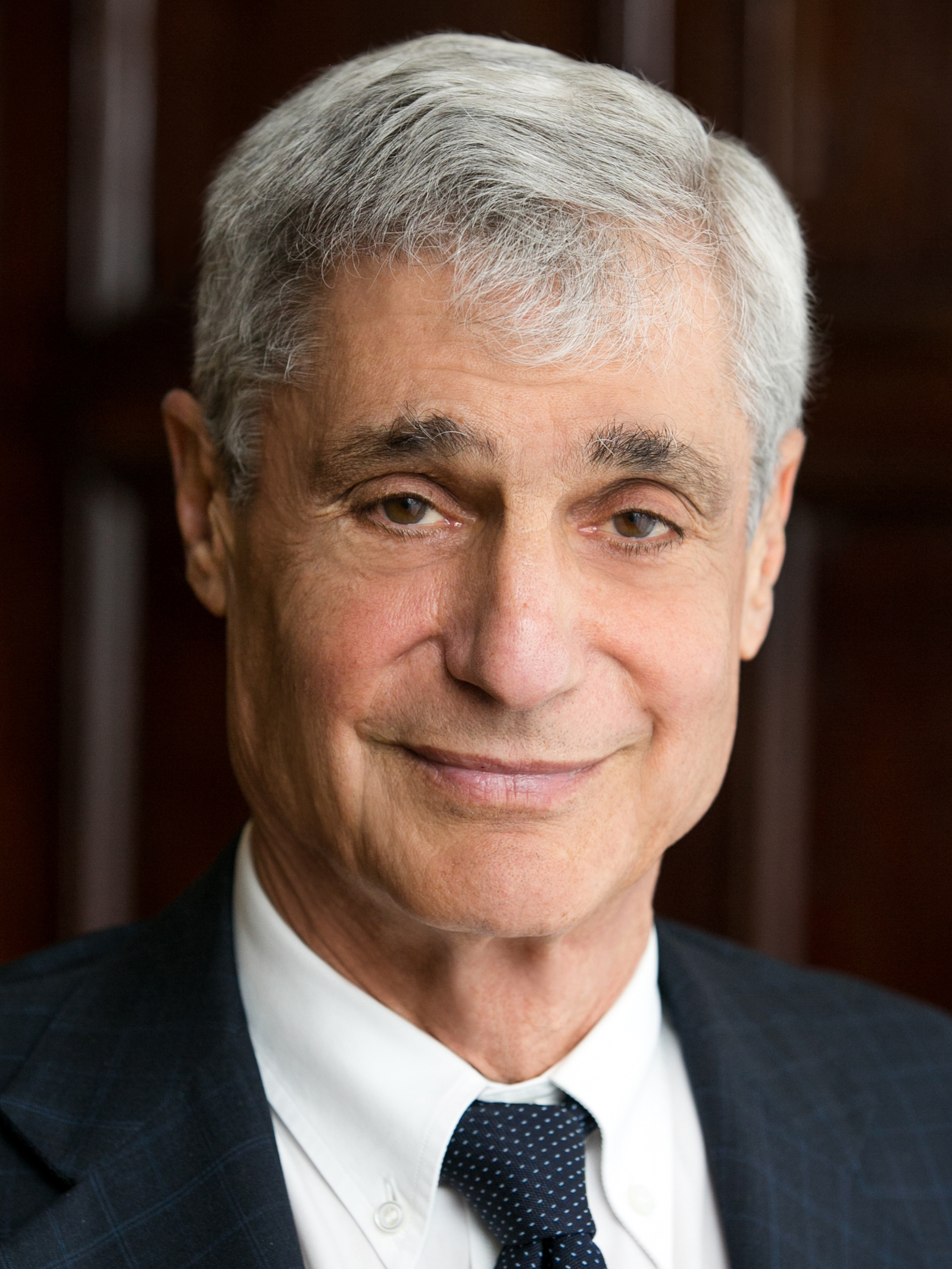
Former Secretary of the Treasury
Robert Rubin
(1995–1999)

=== Other individuals ===
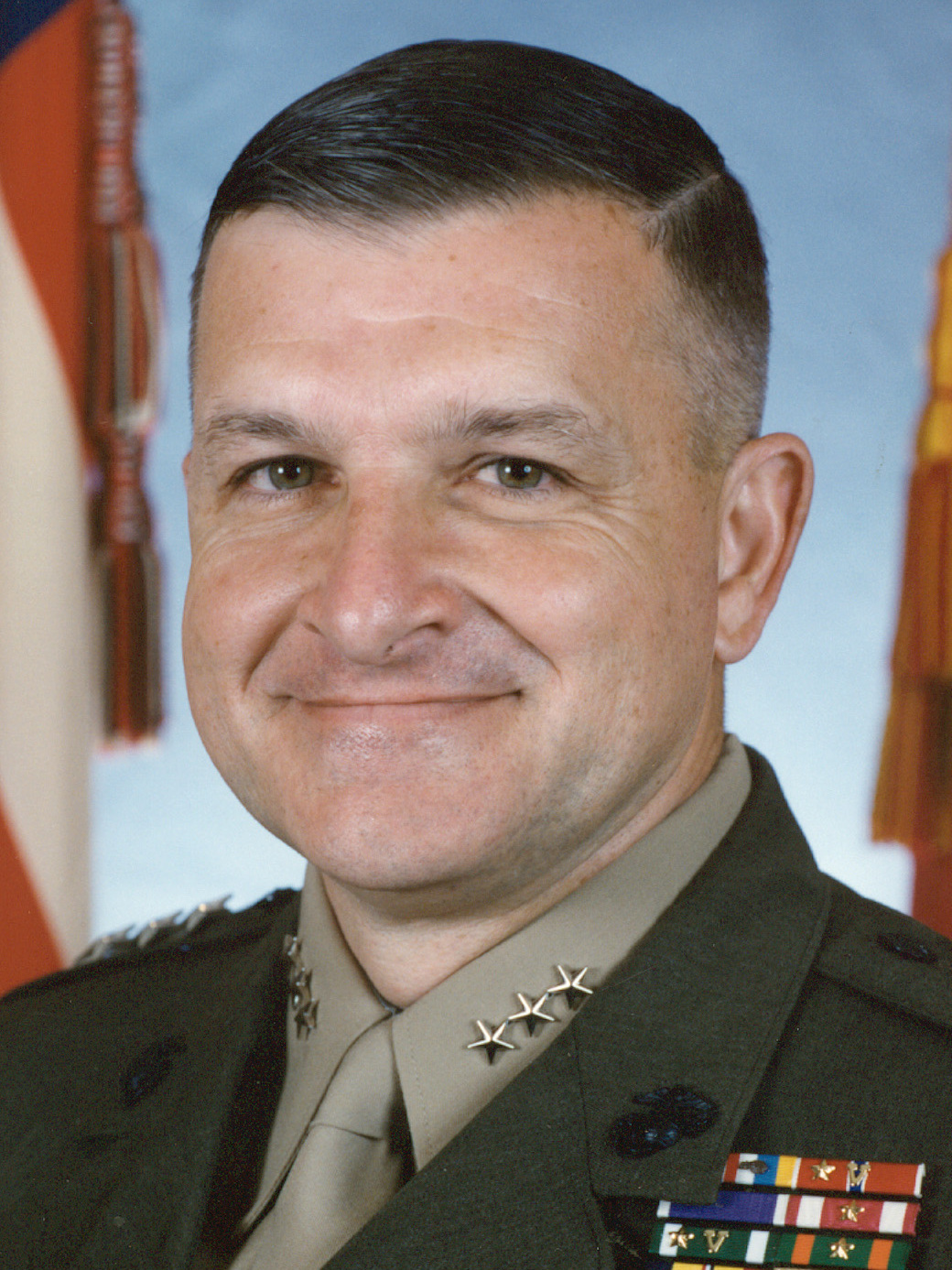
Former United States Special Envoy for Middle East Peace
Anthony Zinni
(2001–2003)

== See also ==
- John Kerry 2004 presidential campaign
- 2004 Democratic Party presidential primaries
- 2004 Democratic National Convention
- 2004 United States presidential election
- List of United States major party presidential tickets
