= 2000 Democratic Party vice presidential candidate selection =

2000 Democratic vice presidential nomination
- August 7, 2000
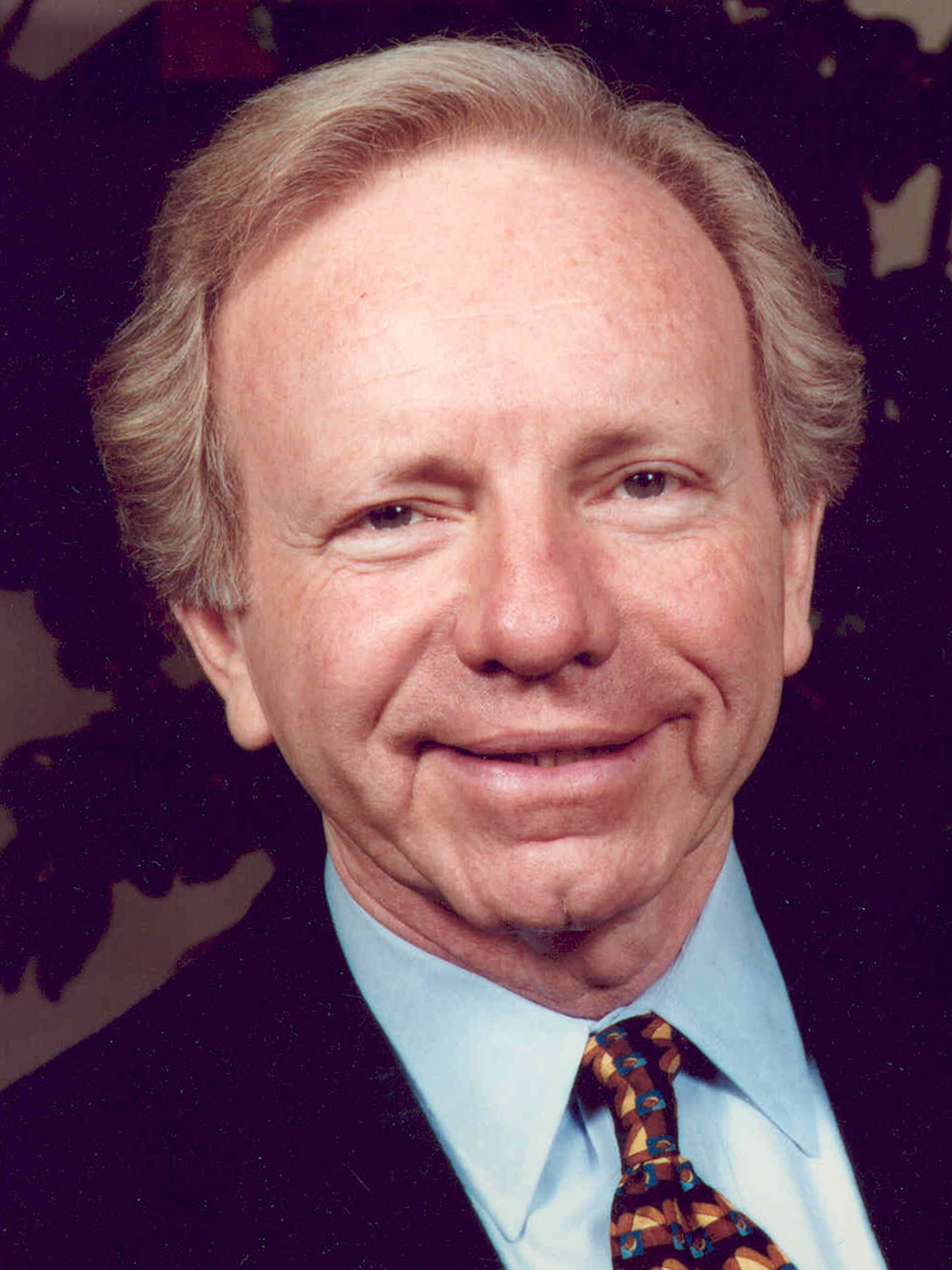
Nominee	Joe Lieberman
Home state	Connecticut
Previous Vice Presidential nominee
Al Gore
Vice Presidential nominee
Joe Lieberman

This article lists those who were potential candidates for the Democratic nomination for Vice President of the United States in the 2000 election. Incumbent Vice President Al Gore won the 2000 Democratic nomination for President of the United States, and chose Connecticut Senator Joseph Lieberman as his running mate on August 7, 2000. Lieberman, a centrist two-term Democratic senator, was chosen for being "tough on defense" and foreign policy issues. Lieberman was the first Jewish nominee chosen for a national ticket. The choice of Lieberman was announced shortly before the 2000 Democratic National Convention. Former Secretary of State Warren Christopher led the vetting process. The Gore–Lieberman ticket ultimately lost to the Bush–Cheney ticket in the general election. Coincidental to the presidential election, Lieberman was re-elected to a third term as senator from Connecticut and subsequently changed his party affiliation to Independent in 2006.

== Selection ==
=== Shortlist ===
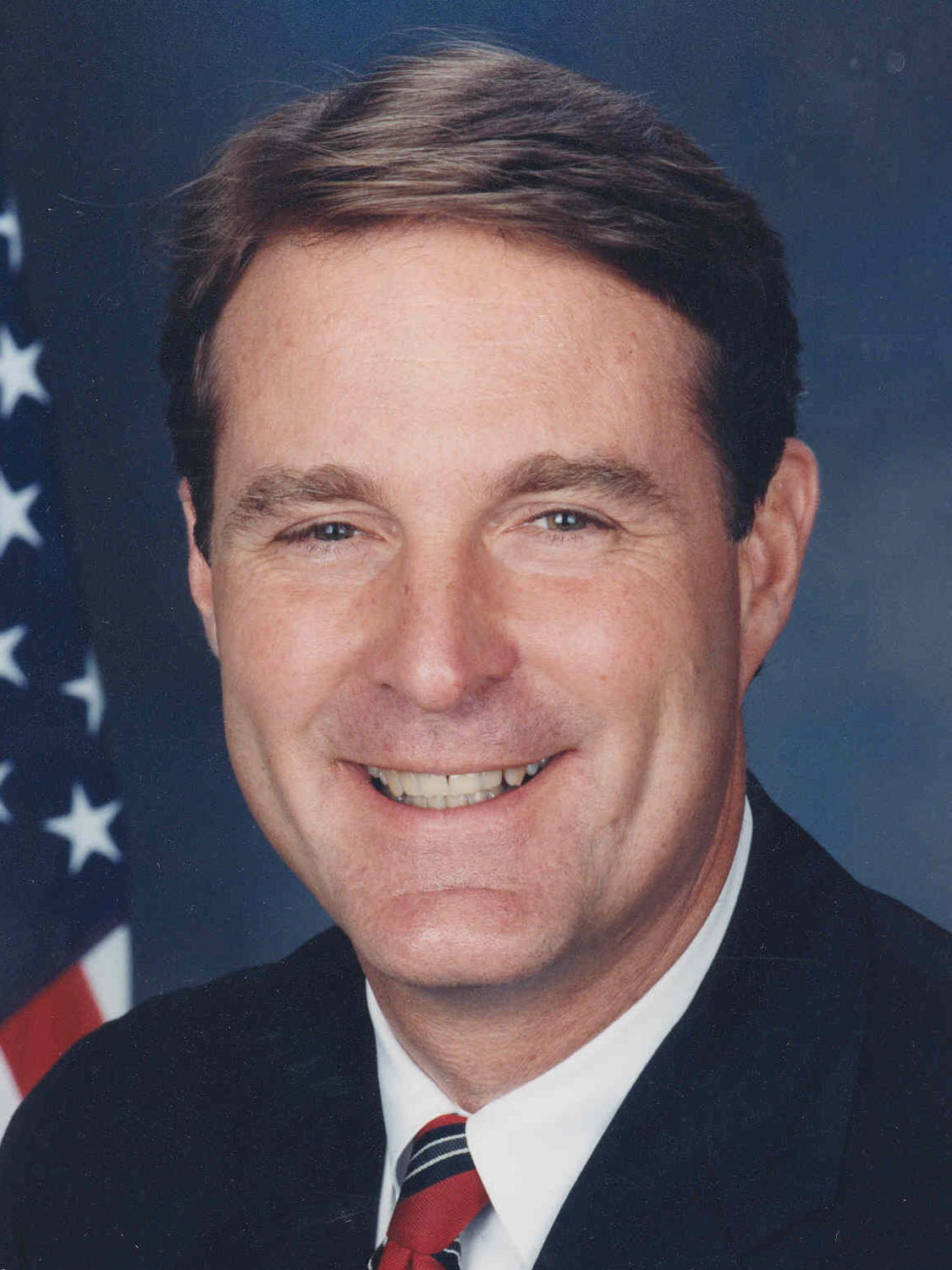
Senator
Evan Bayh
from Indiana
(1999–2011)

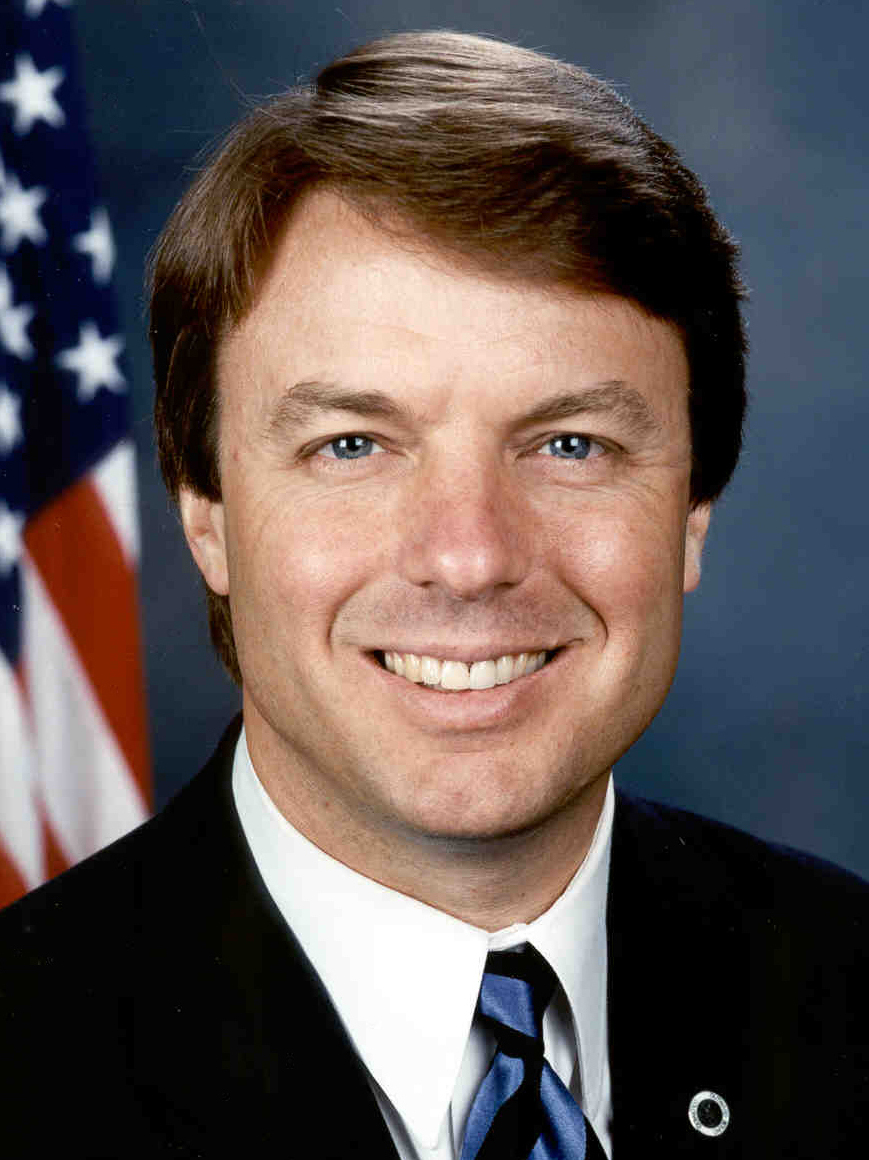
Senator
John Edwards
from North Carolina
(1999–2005) (Note: Would be later chosen to become the 2004 Democratic vice president nominee.)

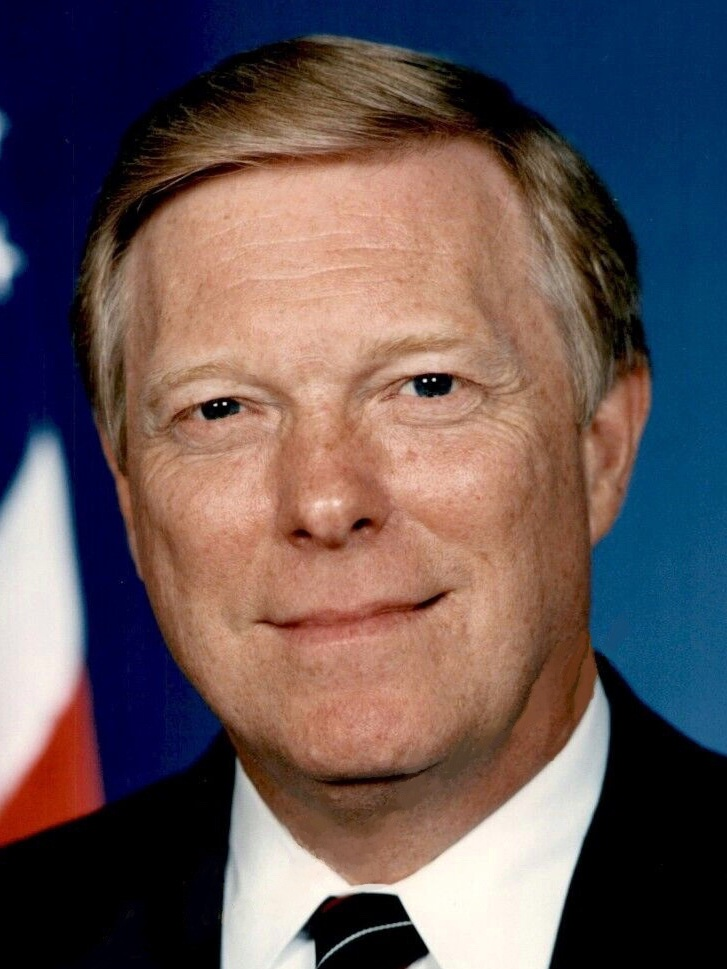
Representative
Dick Gephardt
from Missouri
(1977–2005)

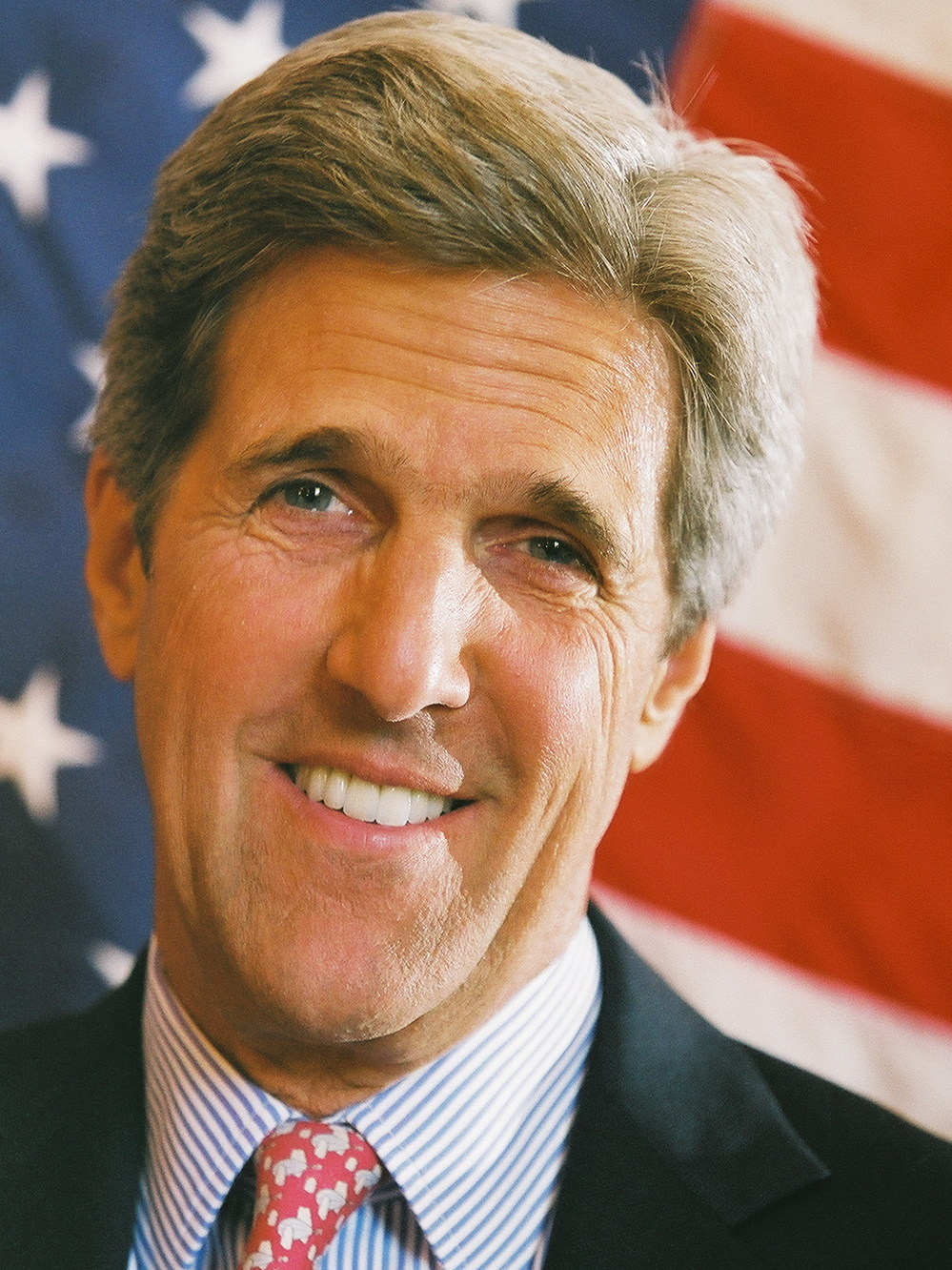
Senator
John Kerry
from Massachusetts
(1985–2013)

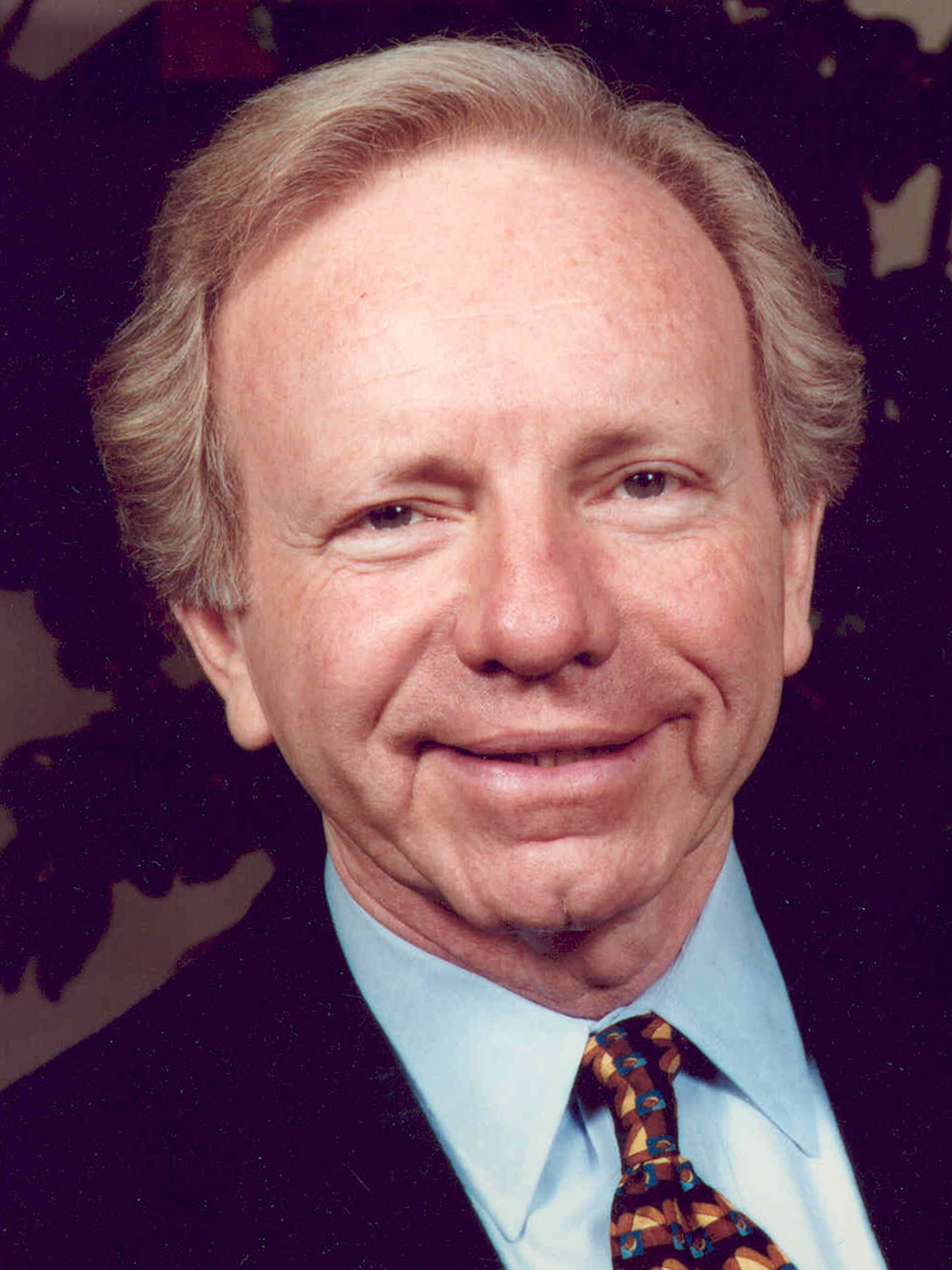
Senator
Joe Lieberman
from Connecticut
(1989–2013)

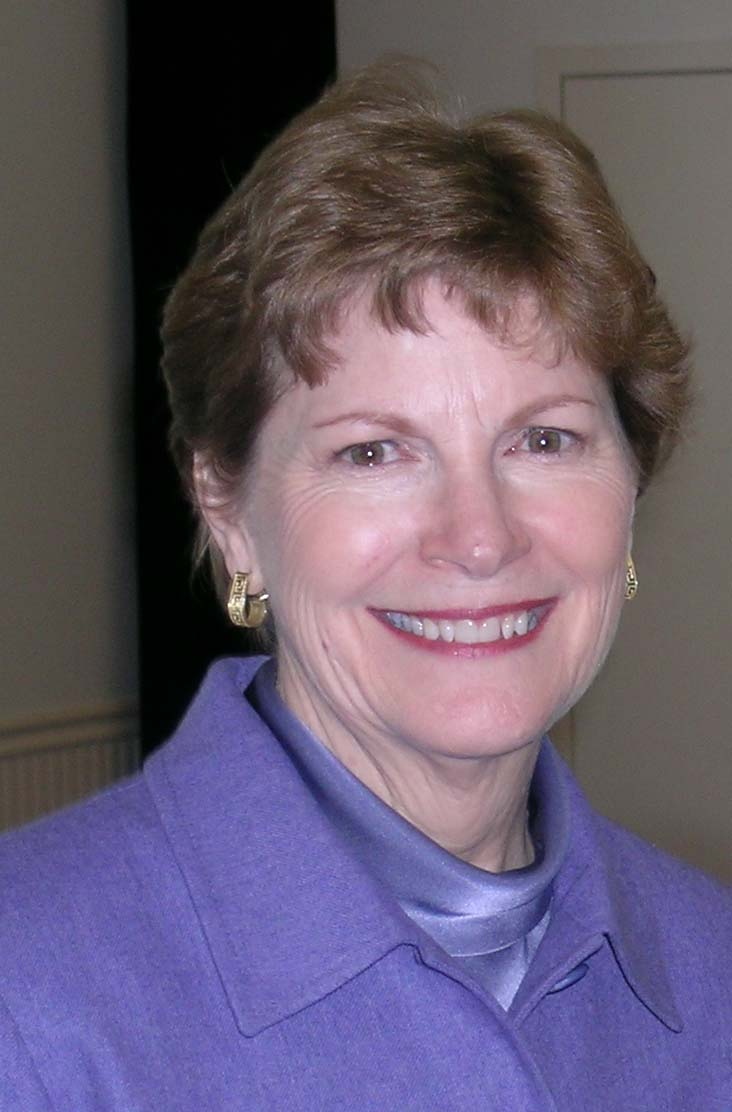
Governor
Jeanne Shaheen
of New Hampshire
(1997–2003)

=== Announcement ===
In August 2000, Gore announced that he had selected Senator Joe Lieberman of Connecticut as his vice presidential running mate. Lieberman became the first person of the Jewish faith to appear on a major party's presidential ticket (Barry Goldwater, the Republican presidential nominee in 1964, was of Jewish descent but identified as an Episcopalian). Lieberman, who was a more conservative Democrat than Gore, had publicly blasted President Clinton for the Monica Lewinsky affair. Many pundits saw Gore's choice of Lieberman as another way of trying to distance himself from the scandals of the Clinton White House.

== Media speculation on possible vice presidential candidates ==
=== Members of Congress ===
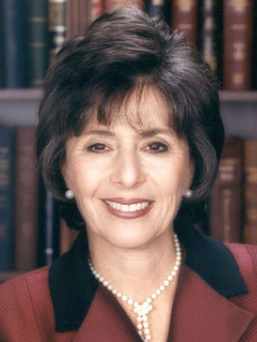
Senator
Barbara Boxer
from California
(1993–2017)

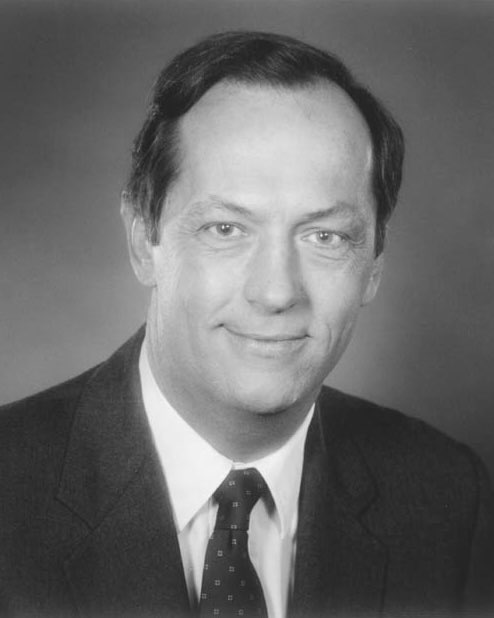
Former Senator and 2000 presidential candidate
Bill Bradley
from New Jersey
(1979–1997)

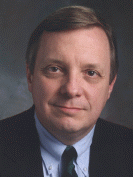
Senator
Dick Durbin
from Illinois
(1997–present)

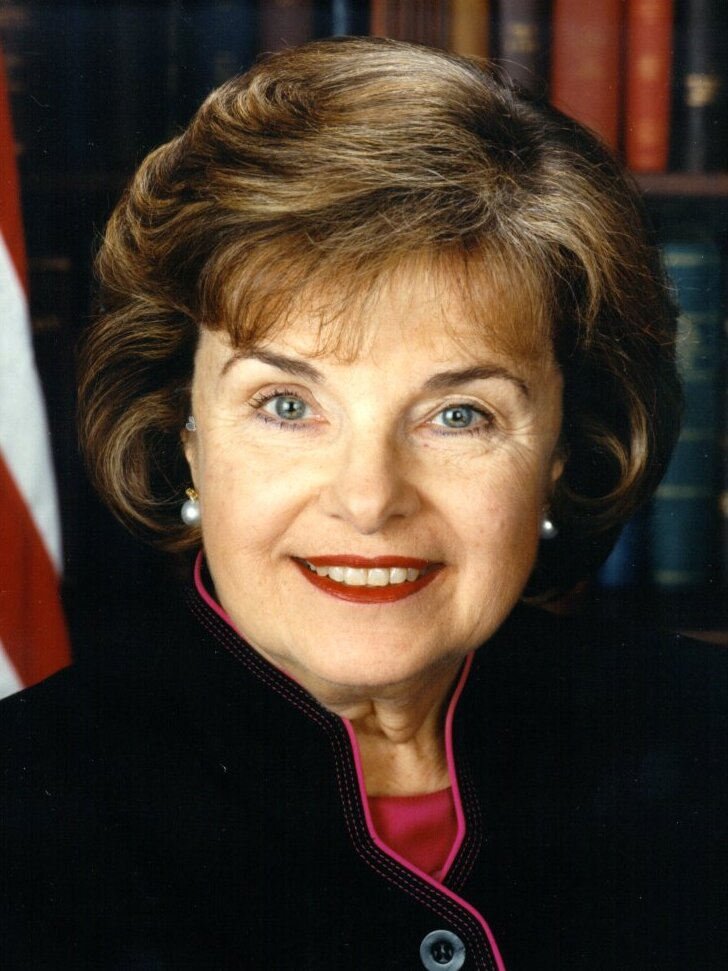
Senator
Dianne Feinstein
from California
(1992–2023)

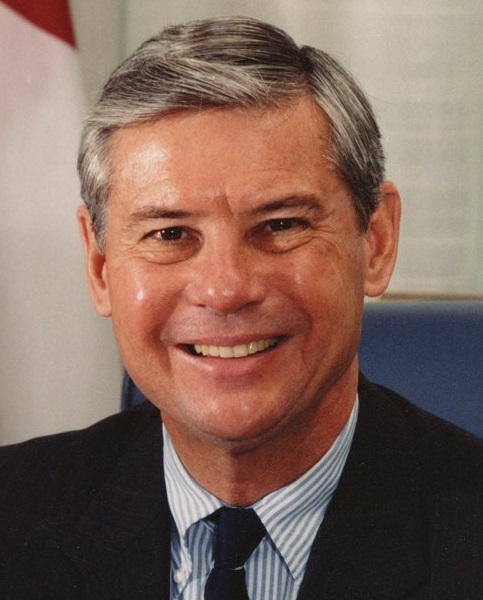
Senator
Bob Graham
from Florida
(1987–2005)

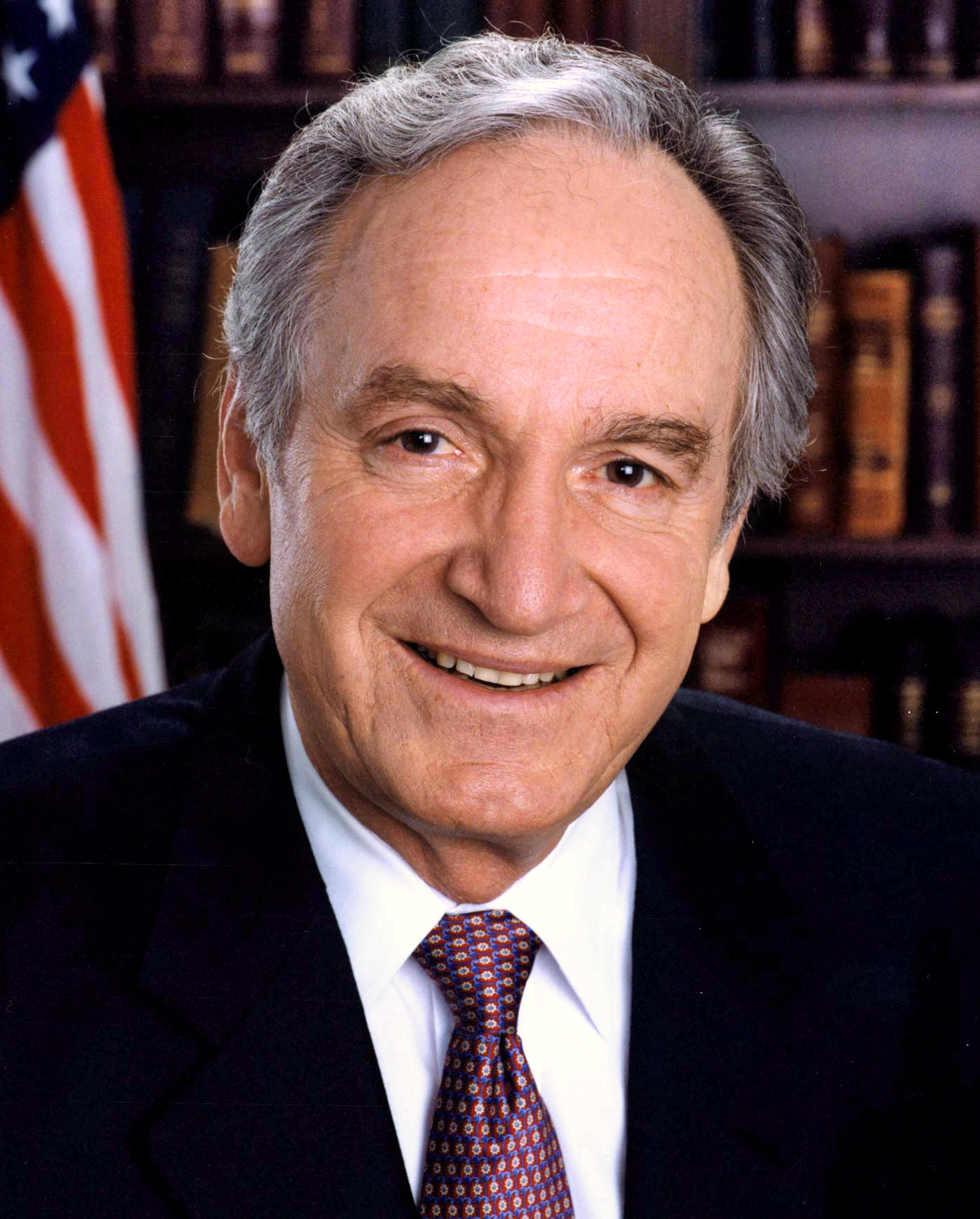
Senator and 1992 presidential candidate
Tom Harkin
from Iowa
(1985–2015)

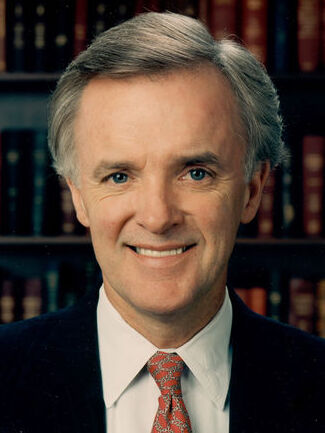
Senator and 1992 presidential candidate
Bob Kerrey
from Nebraska
(1989–2001)

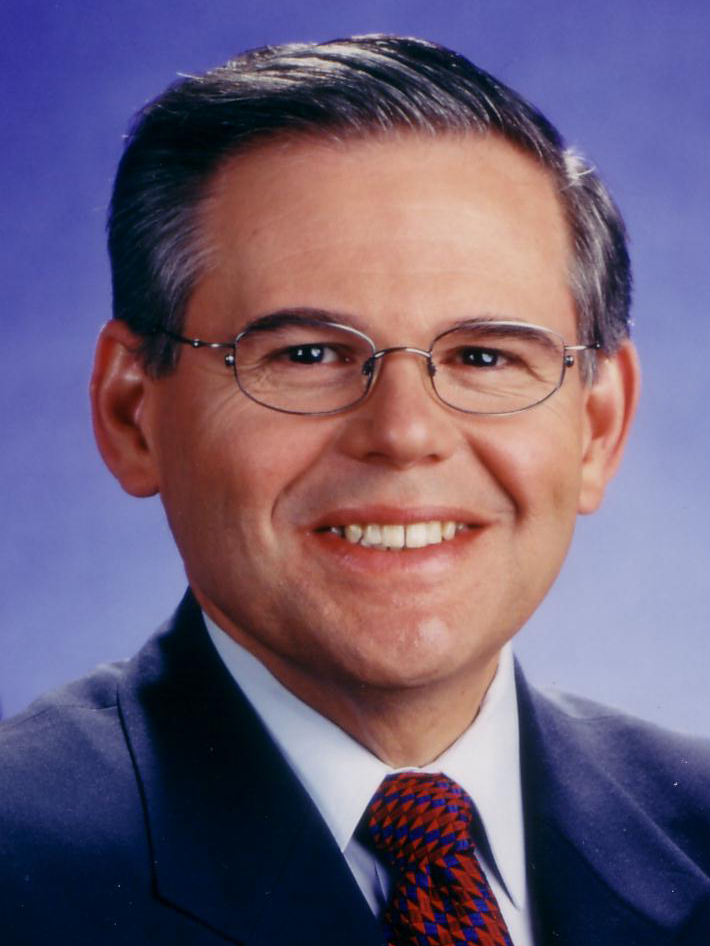
Representative
Bob Menendez
from New Jersey
(1992–2006)

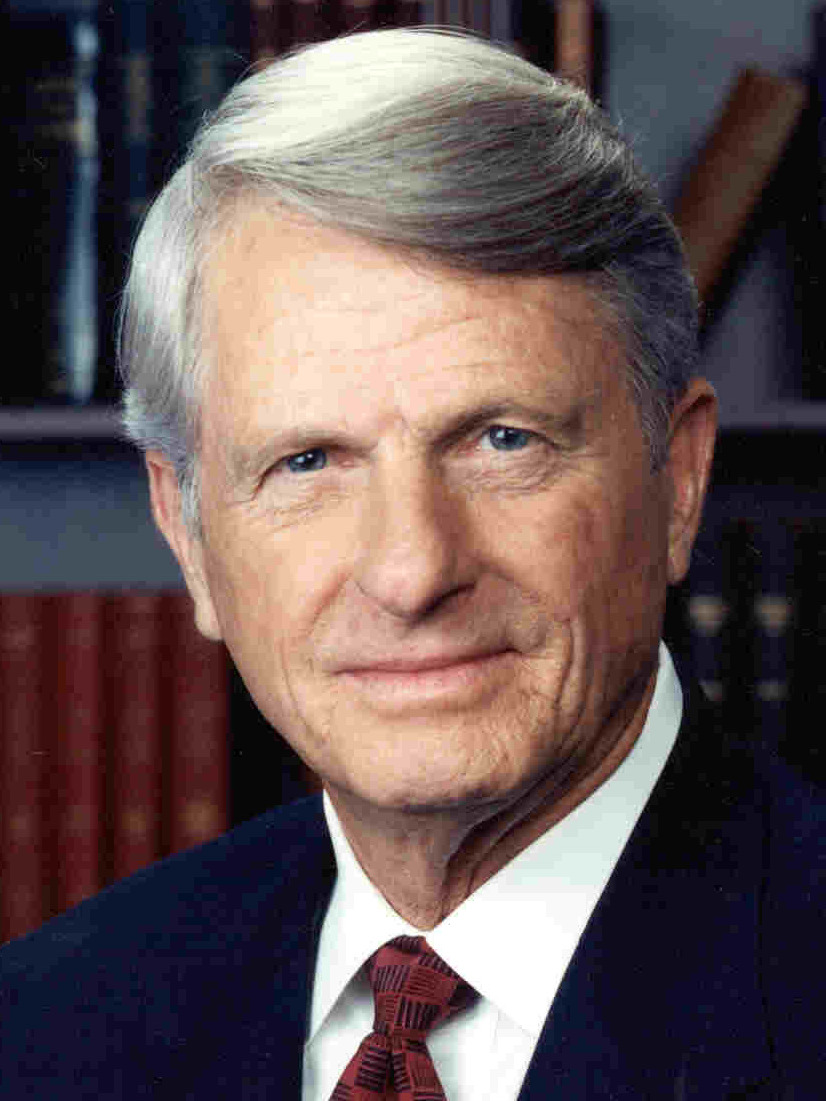
Senator
Zell Miller
from Georgia
(2000–2005)

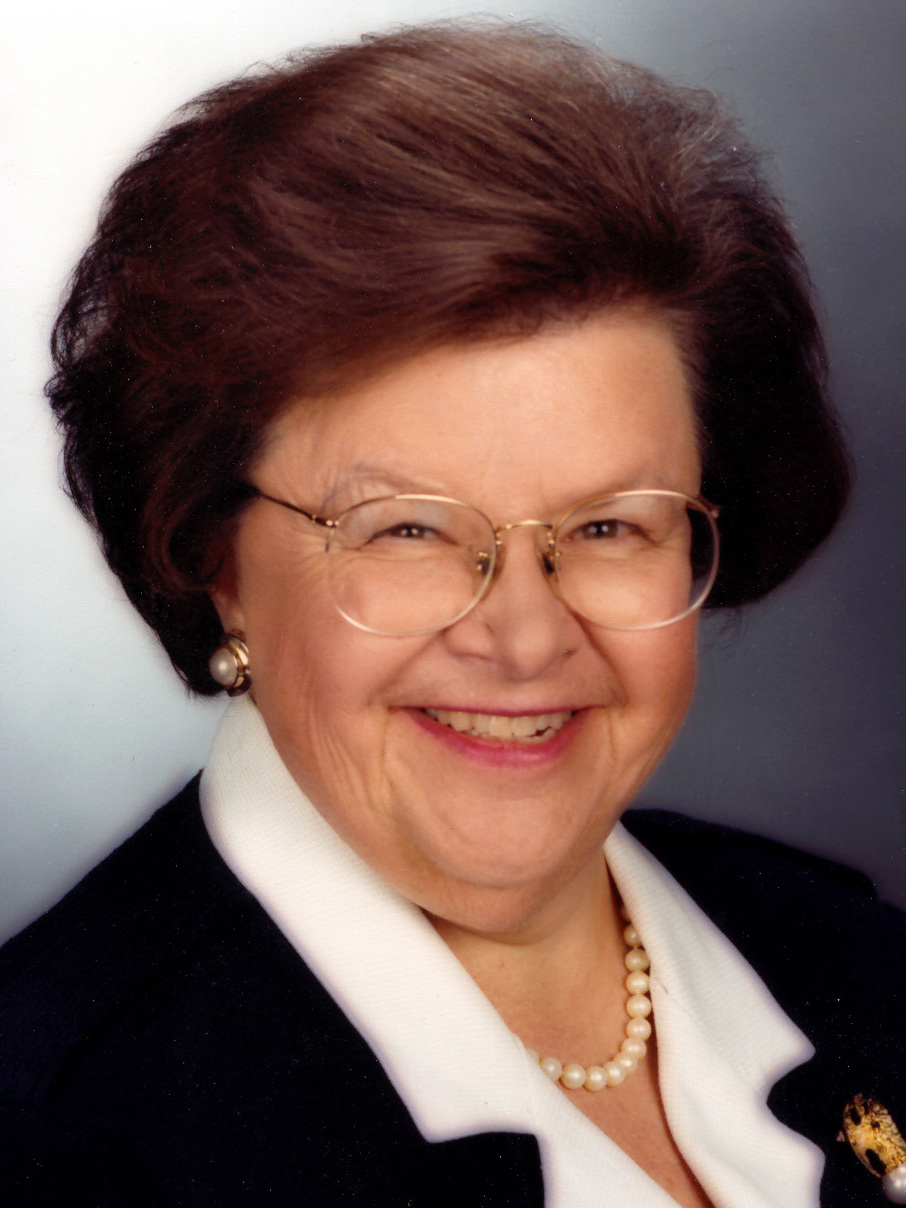
Senator
Barbara Mikulski
from Maryland
(1987–2017)

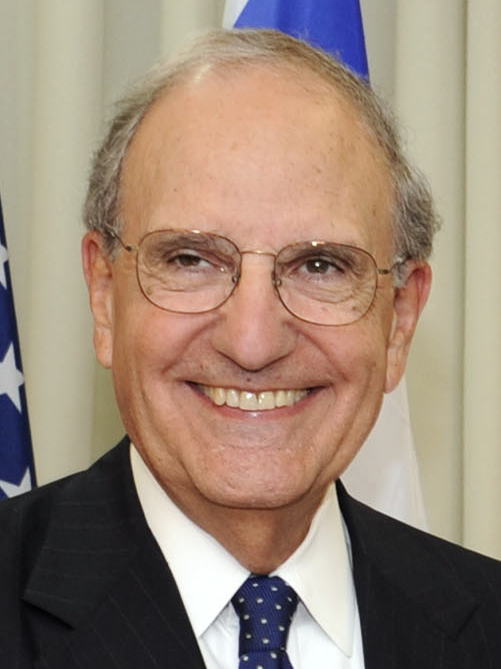
Former Senator
George J. Mitchell
from Maine
(1980–1995)

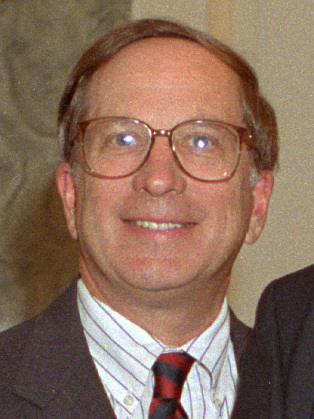
Former Senator
Sam Nunn
from Georgia
(1972–1997)

=== Governors ===
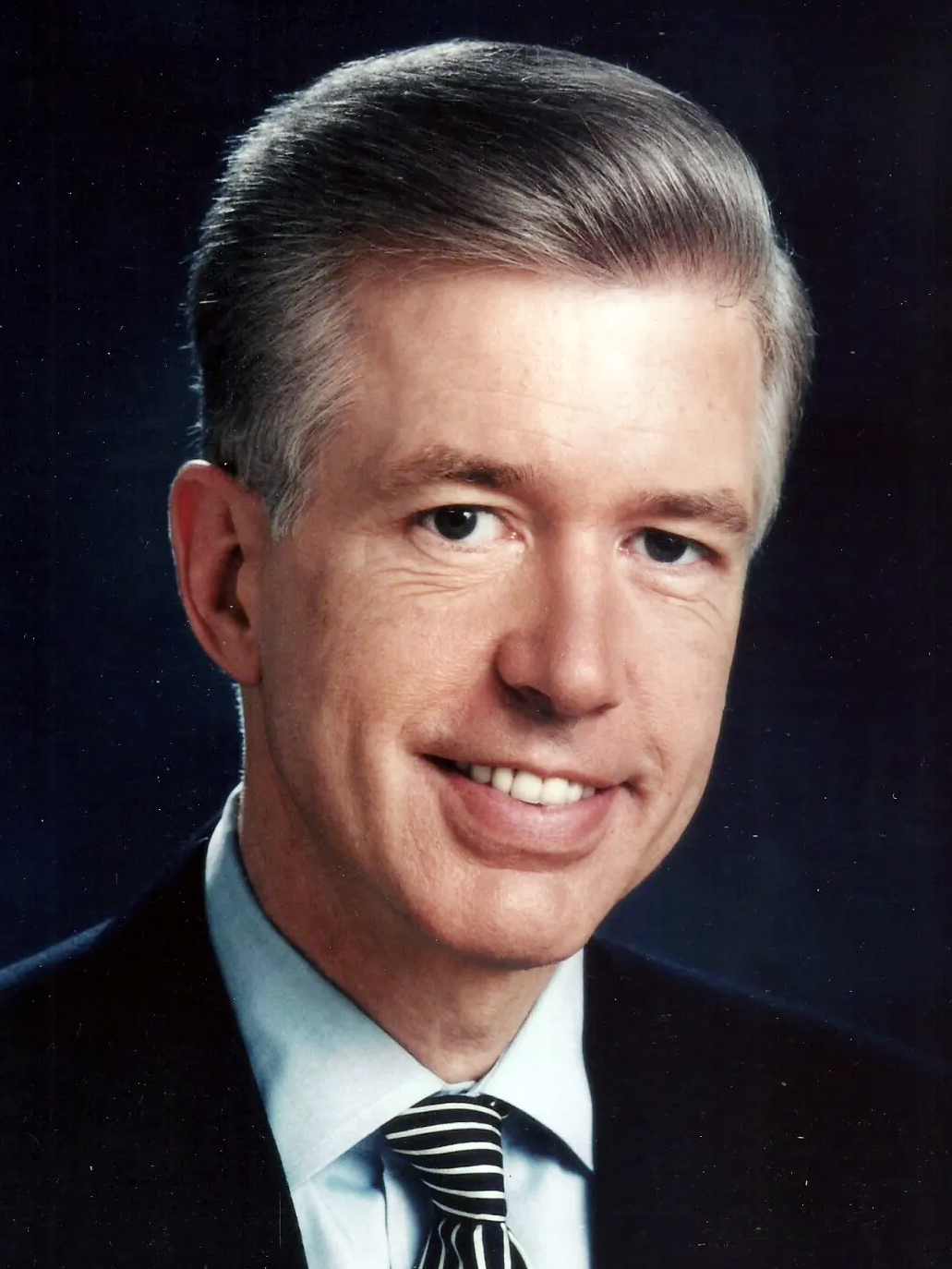
Governor
Gray Davis
of California
(1999–2003)

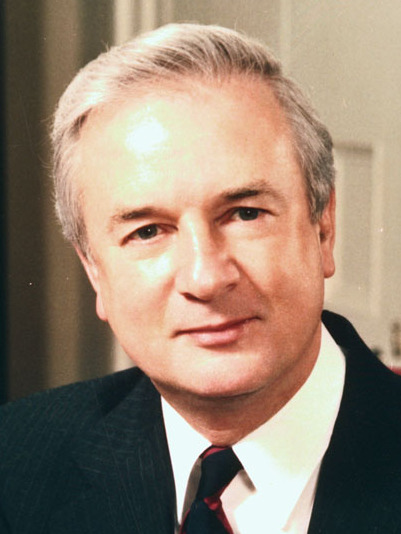
Governor
Jim Hunt
of North Carolina
(1977–1985; 1993–2001)

=== Federal executive branch officials ===
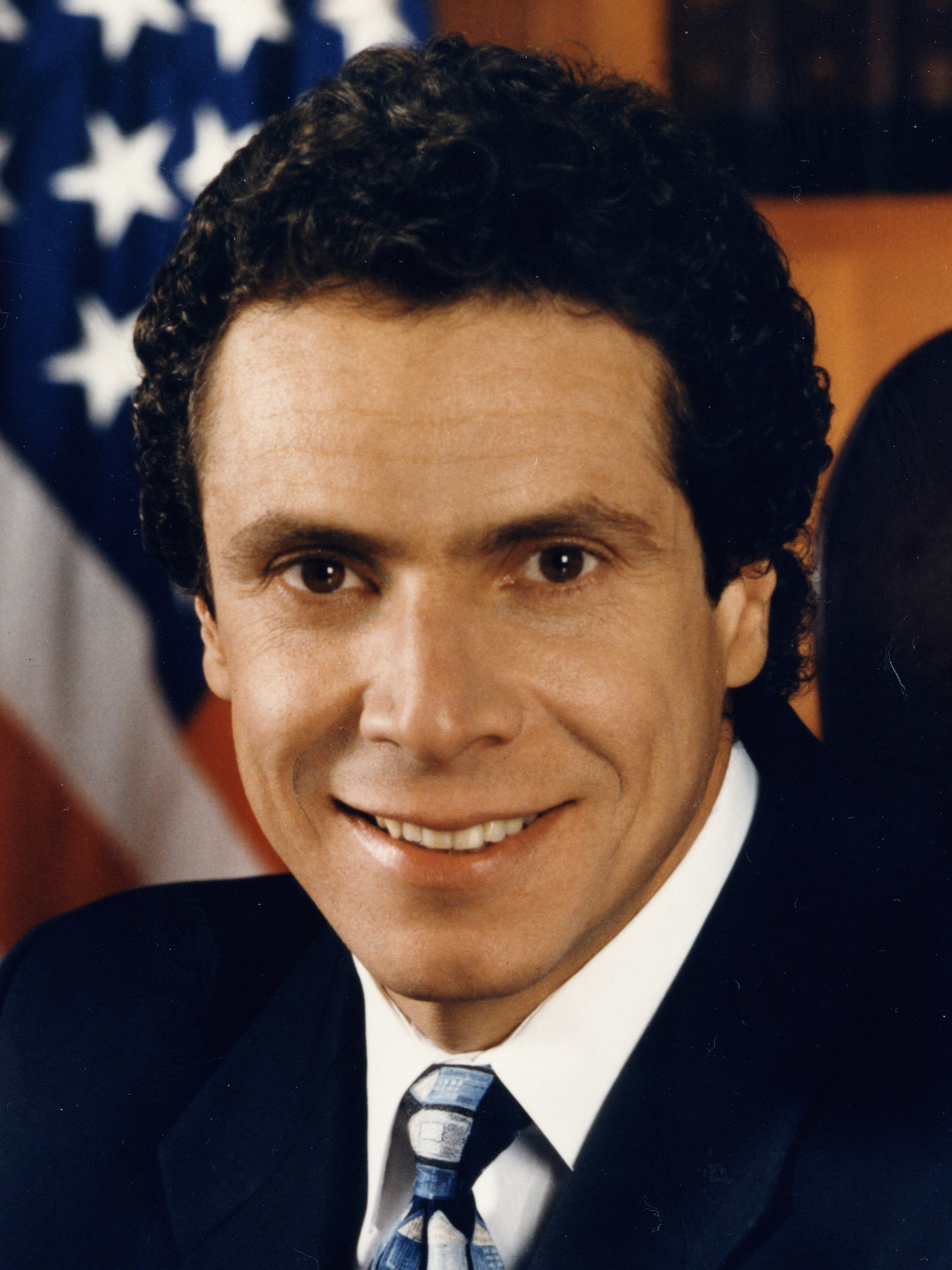
Secretary of Housing and Urban Development
Andrew Cuomo
from New York
(1997–2001)

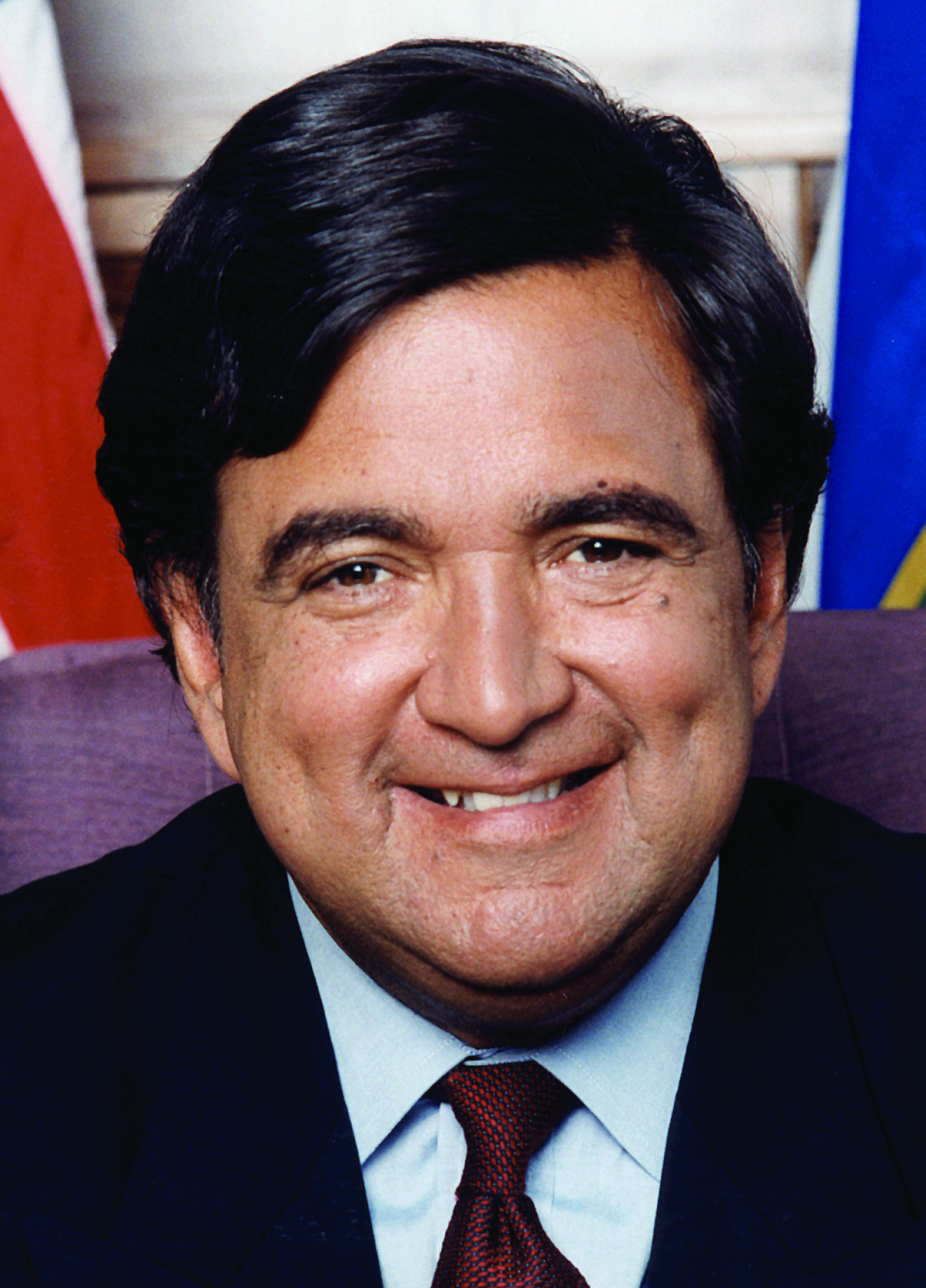
Secretary of Energy
Bill Richardson
from New Mexico
(1998–2001)

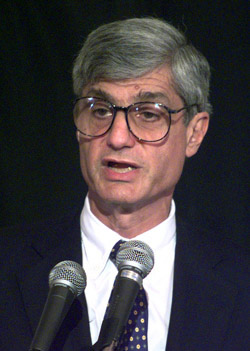
Former Secretary of the Treasury
Robert Rubin
from New York
(1995–1999)

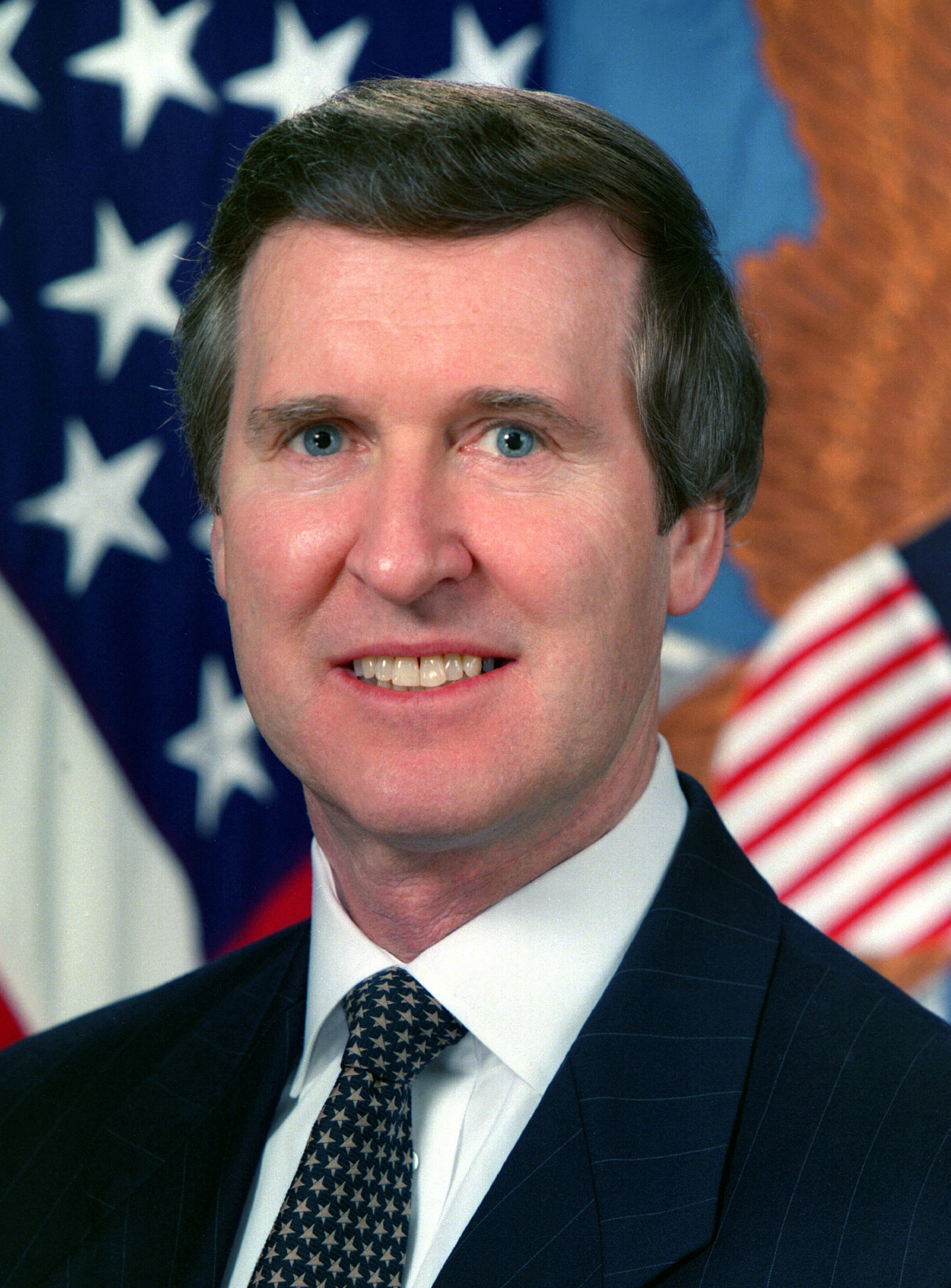
Republican Secretary of Defense
William Cohen
from Maine
(1997–2001)

=== Others ===
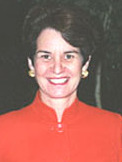
Lieutenant Governor
Kathleen Kennedy Townsend
of Maryland
(1995–2003)

== See also ==
- Al Gore 2000 presidential campaign
- 2000 Democratic Party presidential primaries
- 2000 Democratic National Convention
- 2000 United States presidential election
- List of United States major party presidential tickets
