= Clark Clifford =

American public official (1906–1998)

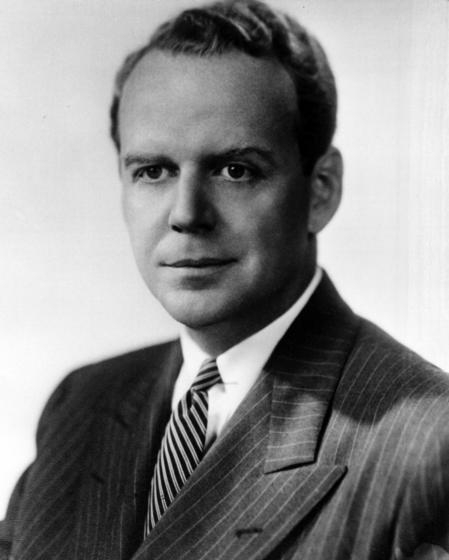
- Official portrait, c. 1947

9th United States Secretary of Defense
- In office March 1, 1968 – January 20, 1969
- President: Lyndon B. Johnson
- Deputy: Paul Nitze
- Preceded by: Robert McNamara
- Succeeded by: Melvin Laird

Chair of the President's Intelligence Advisory Board
- In office April 23, 1963 – February 29, 1968
- President: John F. Kennedy; Lyndon B. Johnson
- Preceded by: James Rhyne Killian
- Succeeded by: Maxwell D. Taylor

2nd White House Counsel
- In office February 1, 1946 – January 31, 1950
- President: Harry S. Truman
- Preceded by: Samuel Rosenman
- Succeeded by: Charles S. Murphy

Personal details
- Born: Clark McAdams Clifford; December 25, 1906 Fort Scott, Kansas, U.S.
- Died: October 10, 1998 (aged 91) Bethesda, Maryland, U.S.
- Resting place: Arlington National Cemetery
- Party: Democratic
- Spouse: Margery Pepperell Kimball (m. 1931)
- Children: 3
- Education: Washington University (BA, LLB)

Military service
- Allegiance: United States
- Branch/service: United States Navy
- Years of service: 1944–1946
- Rank: Captain

Clark McAdams Clifford (December 25, 1906 – October 10, 1998) was an American lawyer who served as an important political adviser to Democratic presidents Harry S. Truman, John F. Kennedy, Lyndon B. Johnson, and Jimmy Carter. His official government positions were White House Counsel (1946–1950), Chairman of the President's Intelligence Advisory Board (1963–1968), and Secretary of Defense (1968–1969); Clifford was also influential in his role as an unofficial, informal presidential adviser in various issues. A successful Washington, D.C., lawyer, he was known for his elite clientele, charming manners, and impeccable suits.

All four Democratic presidents of the Cold War era employed Clifford's services and relied on his counsel. Emblematic of Clifford's influence in postwar Democratic presidential administrations was that after Jimmy Carter won the 1976 presidential election, his transition team was adamant that Clifford, as a symbol of the Washington, D.C., establishment, should not have any influence whatsoever, declaring that "if you ever see us relying on Clark Clifford, you'll know we have failed", yet Carter eventually came to rely on him nonetheless.

In his later years, Clifford became involved in several controversies. He was a key figure in the Bank of Credit and Commerce International scandal, which led to a grand jury indictment.

== Early and personal life ==
Clifford was born on December 25, 1906, in Fort Scott, Kansas. His parents resided there at the time because his father, Frank, was a traveling auditor for Missouri Pacific Railroad. He was named after his maternal uncle, Clark McAdams. He attended Washington University in St. Louis where he was a member of Kappa Alpha Order (Beta Theta) initiated in 1924.

On October 3, 1931, Clifford married Margery Pepperell "Marny" Kimball (April 20, 1908 – April 14, 2000). They had three daughters: Margery Clifford (nickname: Gery), Joyce Clifford Burland and Randall Clifford Wight. Clifford was a self-proclaimed Christian Zionist.

== Career ==
Clifford built a solid reputation practicing law in St. Louis between 1928 and 1943. He served as an officer in the U.S. Navy from 1944 to 1946.

=== Presidential adviser ===
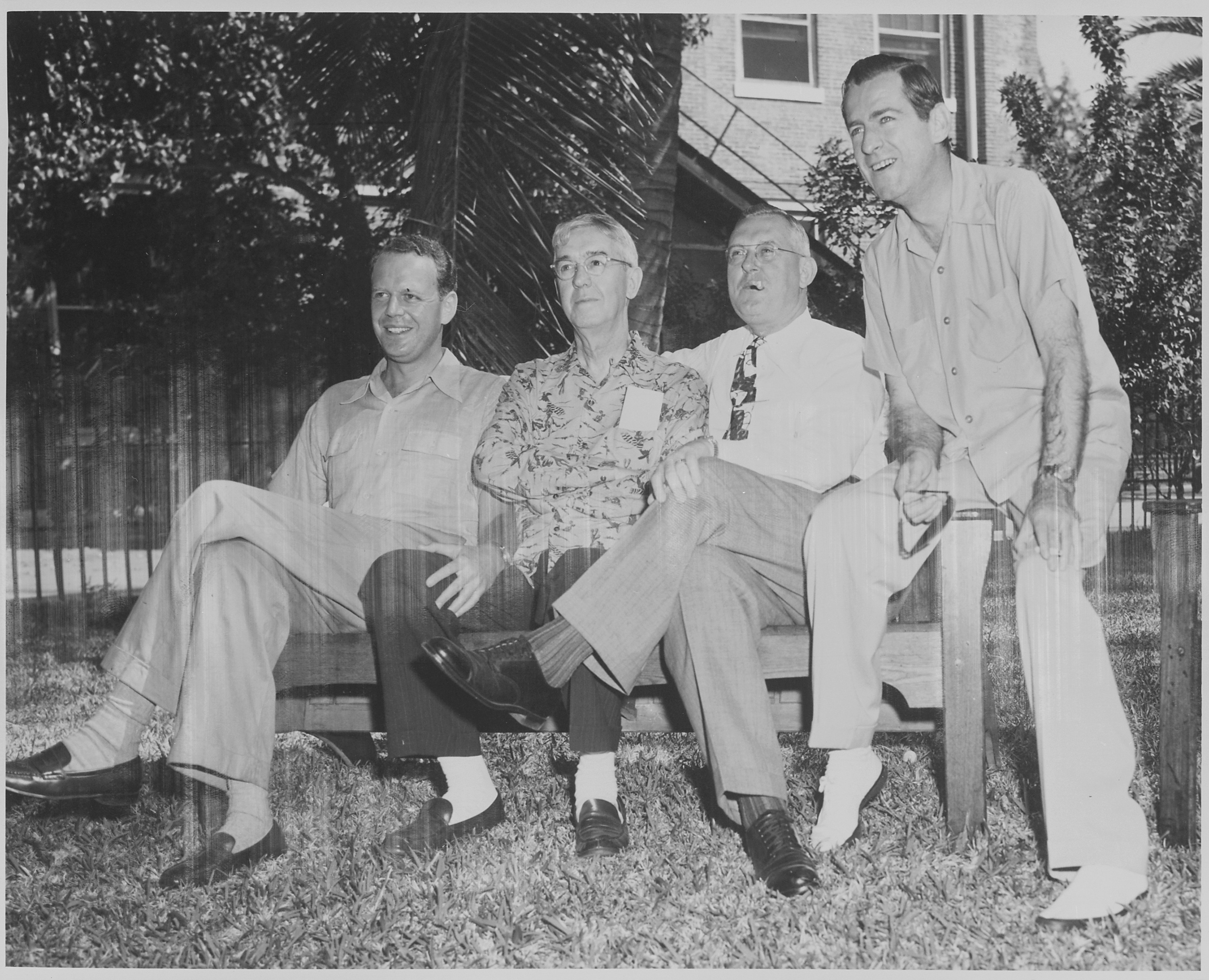
Close associates of President Harry S. Truman, photographed in spring 1948, during the President's vacation at Key West, Florida. Left to right: Clark Clifford (White House Counsel), William D. Hassett (White House Correspondence Secretary), John Steelman (Assistant to the President) and Matthew Connelly (White House Appointments Secretary).

In 1945 he was assigned to the White House and quickly promoted to captain while serving as assistant naval aide and then naval aide to President Harry S Truman. He became a trusted personal adviser and friend of Truman. Clifford went to Washington, first to serve as assistant to the President's Naval Adviser, after the naming of a personal friend from Missouri as the President's Naval Adviser. Following his discharge from the Navy, he remained at Truman's side as White House Counsel from 1946 to 1950, as Truman came rapidly to trust and rely upon Clifford.

Clifford was a key architect of Truman's campaign in 1948, when Truman pulled off a stunning upset victory over Republican nominee Thomas Dewey. Clifford encouraged Truman to embrace a left-wing populist image in hope of undermining the impact on the race of third-party Progressive candidate Henry A. Wallace, who had served as President Franklin D. Roosevelt's Vice-President from 1941 to 1945. Clifford also believed that a strong pro-civil rights stance, while sure to alienate traditional Southern Democrats, would not result in a serious challenge to the party's supremacy in that region. This prediction was foiled by Strom Thurmond's candidacy as a splinter States' Rights Democrat, but Clifford's strategy nonetheless helped win Truman election in his own right and establish the Democratic Party's position in the Civil Rights Movement.

In his role as presidential adviser, one of his most significant contributions was his successful advocacy, along with David Niles, of prompt 1948 recognition of the new Jewish state of Israel, over the strong objections of Secretary of State General George Marshall. Of similar importance, with the input of senior officials in the Departments of State, War, and Justice, the Joint Chiefs of Staff, and the Central Intelligence Group, and utilizing the expertise of George F. Kennan and Charles Bohlen, was his preparation, along with George Elsey, of the top secret Clifford-Elsey Report for President Truman in 1946. That report, solicited by the President, which detailed the numerous ways in which the Soviet Union had gone back on its various treaties and understandings with the Western powers, along with Kennan's X Article in Foreign Affairs, was instrumental in turning U.S. relations toward the Soviet Union in the direction of a harder line. During this period he participated extensively in the legislative efforts that resulted in the National Security Act of 1947 and its 1949 amendments.

After leaving the government in 1950, Clifford practiced law in Washington, D.C., but continued to advise Democratic Party leaders. One of his law clients was John F. Kennedy, then a U.S. Senator, and Clifford tried to assuage Truman's suspicion of Kennedy and his father, Joseph P. Kennedy. Clifford was the head of the presidential transition of John F. Kennedy. Clifford was also a member of President-elect Kennedy's Committee on the Defense Establishment, headed by Stuart Symington. In May 1961, Kennedy appointed Clifford to the President's Foreign Intelligence Advisory Board, which he chaired beginning in April 1963 and ending in January 1968. After Johnson became president in November 1963 following Kennedy's assassination, Clifford served frequently as an unofficial White House Counsel and sometimes undertook short-term official duties, including a trip with General Maxwell Taylor in 1967 to South Vietnam and other countries in Southeast Asia and the Pacific.

==== USS Liberty incident ====
Clifford served as the chairman of the President's Intelligence Advisory Board during the 1967 Six-Day War. In this capacity, he oversaw the official investigation of the 1967 USS Liberty incident. As a staunch supporter of Israel, he was perplexed by the Israeli government’s explanation following the attack: “We were baffled. From the beginning there was skepticism and disbelief about the Israeli version of events. We had enormous respect for Israeli intelligence and it was difficult to believe the Liberty had been attacked by mistake. Every conceivable theory was advanced that morning. It became clear that from the sketchy information available we could not figure out what happened.”

He delved deeper into the inconsistencies in the Israeli explanation: “That the Liberty could have been mistaken for the Egyptian supply ship El Quseir is unbelievable. El Quseir has one-fourth the displacement of the Liberty, roughly half the beam, is 180 feet shorter, and is very differently configured. The Liberty’s unusual antenna array and hull markings should have been visible to low-flying aircraft and torpedo boats. In the heat of battle the Liberty was able to identify one of the attacking torpedo boats as Israeli and to ascertain its hull number. In the same circumstances, trained Israeli naval personnel should have been able to easily see and identify the larger hull markings on the Liberty. The best interpretation of from available facts is that there were gross and inexcusable failures in the command and control of subordinate Israeli naval and air elements…The unprovoked attack on the Liberty constitutes a flagrant act of gross negligence for which the Israeli Government should be held completely responsible, and the Israeli military personnel involved should be punished.”

Immediately after the attack, he had pressured the Johnson administration to hold the Israelis responsible: “My concern is that we are not tough enough. Handle as if Arabs or USSR had done it. Manner egregious. Inconceivable that it was accident. 3 strafing passes, 3 torpedo boats. Set forth facts. Punish Israelis responsible.”

He expressed his desire to hold Israel accountable in an eponymous 1967 report that he had authored: “I do not know to this day at what level the attack on the Liberty was authorized and I think it is unlikely that the full truth will ever come out. Having been for so long a staunch supporter of Israel, I was particularly troubled by this incident; I could not bring myself to believe that such an action could have been authorized by Levi Eshkol. Yet somewhere inside the Israeli government, somewhere along the chain-of-command, something had gone terribly wrong – and then had been covered-up. I never felt the Israelis made adequate restitution or explanation for their actions.”

=== Secretary of Defense ===
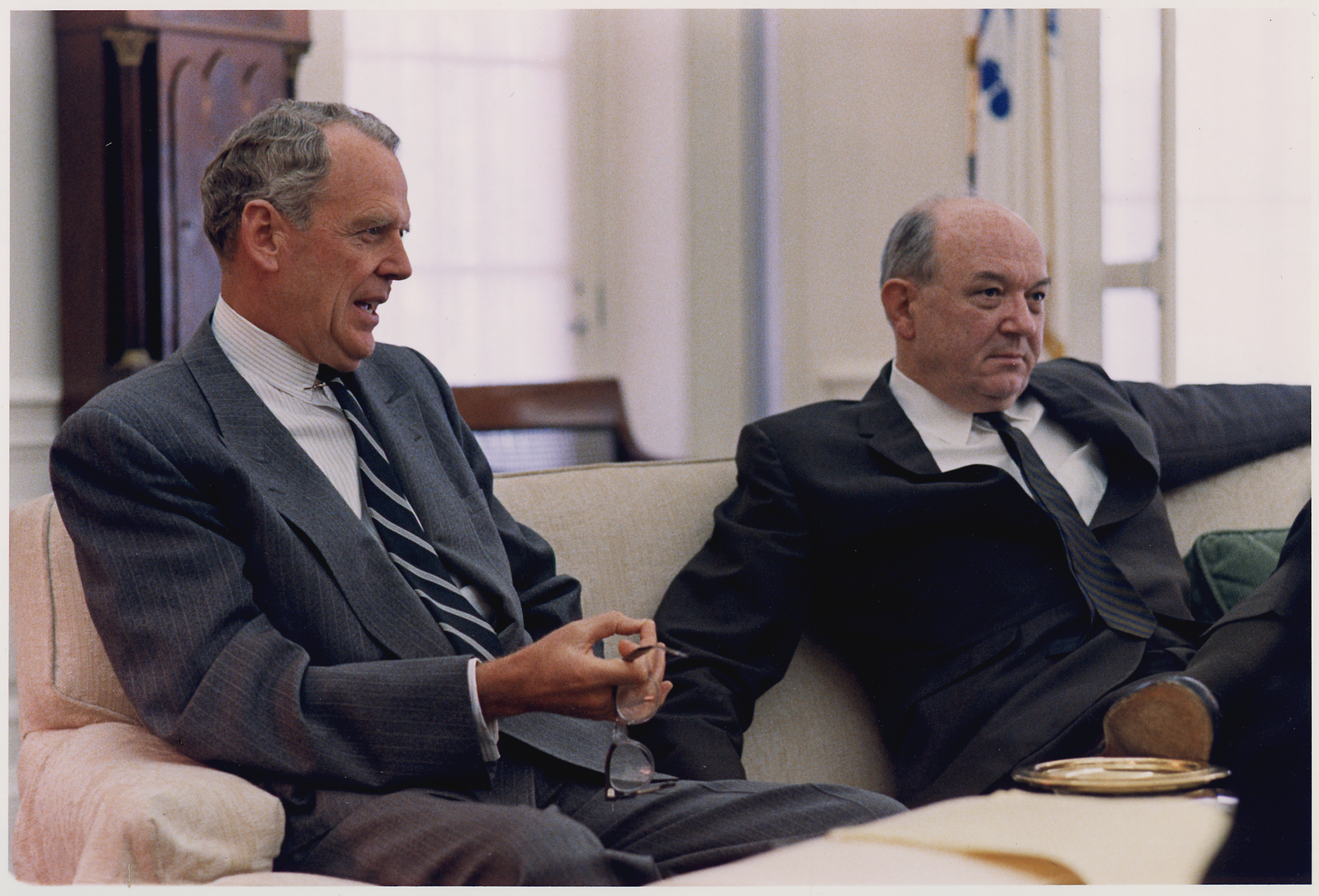
Secretary of Defense Clifford with the Secretary of State Dean Rusk in 1968.

On January 19, 1968, Johnson announced his selection of Clifford to succeed Robert McNamara as the U.S. Secretary of Defense. Clifford estimated that, in the year just prior to his appointment, he had spent about half of his time advising the President and the other half working for his law firm. Widely known and respected in Washington and knowledgeable on defense matters, Clifford was generally hailed as a worthy successor to McNamara. Many regarded the new secretary as more of a hawk on Vietnam than McNamara, and thought his selection might presage an escalation of the U.S. military effort there. Clifford attempted to allay such fears when, responding to a query about whether he was a hawk (favoring aggressive military action) or a dove (favoring a peaceful resolution to the Vietnam War), he remarked, "I am not conscious of falling under any of those ornithological divisions." Policy planning director Leslie Gelb recalled in 2018, however, that Clifford was secretly opposed to the war since 1965.

The new Secretary did not change the management system McNamara had installed at the Pentagon, and for the most part assigned internal administration to Deputy Secretary of Defense Paul H. Nitze. Clifford made no effort to depart from McNamara's policies and programs on such matters as nuclear strategy, NATO, and military assistance, but he favored the Sentinel anti-ballistic missile system, to which McNamara had given only lukewarm backing. Clifford wanted to deploy the system, and supported congressional appropriations for it. One important effect of Sentinel construction, he thought, would be to encourage the Soviet Union to enter arms control talks with the U.S. Indeed, before Clifford left office, the Johnson administration made arrangements for negotiations that eventually led to the Anti-Ballistic Missile Treaty of 1972.

Clifford continued McNamara's highly publicized Cost Reduction Program, announcing that over $1.2 billion had been saved in fiscal year (FY) 1968 as a result of the effort. Faced with a congressionally mandated reduction of expenditures in FY 1969, Clifford suspended the planned activation of an infantry division and deactivated 50 small ships, 9 naval air squadrons, and 23 Nike-Hercules missile launch sites. By the time Clifford became secretary, Defense Department work on the fiscal year 1969 budget was complete. It amounted in total obligational authority to $77.7 billion, almost $3 billion more than in FY 1968. The final FY 1970 budget, which Clifford and his staff worked on before they left office after the election of Richard Nixon to the presidency, amounted to $75.5 billion TOA (Total Obligational Authority).

==== Vietnam ====
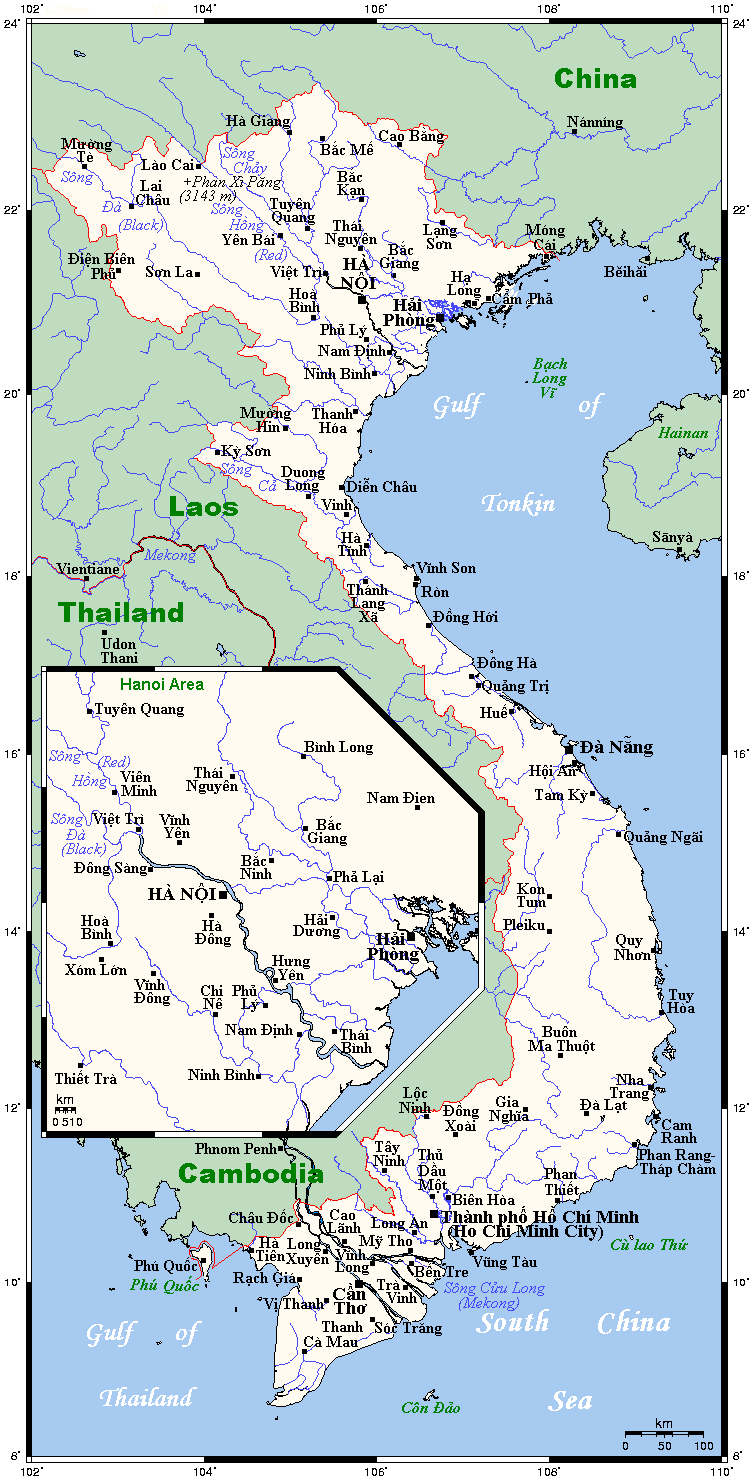
Political map of Vietnam in 2007 with latitudes

Clifford took office committed to rethinking Johnson's Vietnam policies, and Vietnam policy consumed most of his time. He had argued against escalation in 1965 in private counsel with the president, but then provided public support for the president's position once the decision was made. At his confirmation hearing, he told the Armed Services Committee of the U.S. Senate that the limited objective of the U.S. was to guarantee to the people of South Vietnam the right of self-determination. He opposed ending the U.S. bombing of North Vietnam at the time, but acknowledged that the situation could change.

In fact, on March 31, 1968, just a month after Clifford arrived at the Pentagon, Johnson, in an effort to get peace talks started, ordered the cessation of bombing north of the 20th parallel, an area comprising almost 80 percent of North Vietnam's land area and 90 percent of its population. In the same address, Johnson announced that he would not be a candidate for reelection in 1968, surprising everyone, Clifford included. Soon the North Vietnamese agreed to negotiations, which began in Paris in mid-May 1968. Later, on October 31, 1968, to encourage the success of these talks, the President, with Clifford's strong support, ordered an end to all bombing in North Vietnam.

Clifford, like McNamara, had to deal with frequent requests for additional troops from military commanders in Vietnam. When he became secretary, the authorized force in Vietnam was 525,000. Soon after moving into his Pentagon office, Clifford persuaded Johnson to deny General William Westmoreland's request for an additional 206,000 American troops in Vietnam.

At the end of March 1968, however, Johnson agreed to send 24,500 more troops on an emergency basis, raising authorized strength to 549,500, a figure never reached. Even as he oversaw a continued buildup, Clifford preferred to emphasize the points Johnson had made in his March 31, 1968, address: that the South Vietnamese army could take over a greater share of the fighting, that the administration would place an absolute limit on the number of U.S. troops in Vietnam, and that it would take steps, including the bombing restrictions, to reduce the combat level.

Eventually Clifford moved very close, with Johnson's tacit support, to the views McNamara held on Vietnam just before he left office—no further increases in U.S. troop levels, support for the bombing halt and gradual disengagement from the conflict. By this time Clifford clearly disagreed with Secretary of State Dean Rusk, who believed, according to The Washington Post, "that the war was being won by the allies" and that it "would be won if America had the will to win it." He later recalled how he turned against the war: "I found out that we couldn't win the war with the limitations that we had, which I thought were correct limitations, and I thought all we were going to do was just waste the lives of our men and our treasure out in the jungles of North and South Vietnam."

After he left office, Clifford, in the July 1969 issue of Foreign Affairs, made his views very clear: "Nothing we might do could be so beneficial ... as to begin to withdraw our combat troops. Moreover ... we cannot realistically expect to achieve anything more through our military force, and the time has come to begin to disengage. That was my final conclusion as I left the Pentagon ...".

Although the Johnson Administration ended under the cloud of the Vietnam War, Clifford concluded his short term as Secretary of Defense with his reputation actually enhanced. He got along well with the U.S. Congress, and this helped him to secure approval of at least some of his proposals. He settled into his duties quickly and efficiently, and capably managed the initial de-escalation of U.S. involvement in Vietnam; indeed, he apparently strongly influenced Johnson in favor of a de-escalation strategy. As he left office to return to his law practice in Washington, Clifford expressed the hope and expectation that international tensions would abate, citing the shift in the Vietnam confrontation from the battlefield to the conference table, and the evident willingness of the Soviet Union to discuss limitations on strategic nuclear weapons.

=== Church Committee ===
On Friday, December 5, 1975, Clifford recommended to the Church Committee that the National Security Council and a Director General of Intelligence—not the Central Intelligence Agency—be the ones with the authority to decide whether or not to engage in covert action.

=== Special presidential emissary to India ===
Clifford's legal practice and lobbying work made him wealthy, and he was considered one of Washington's "superlawyers" due to the reach of his influence and seemingly limitless connections. Clifford's office overlooked the White House, emphasizing his long experience in the capital. In 1980, President Carter appointed him as special presidential emissary to India. Clifford made waves by threatening the newly established regime of Ayatollah Khomeini of Iran with war for its intransigence in negotiating the release of the hostages seized from the U.S. embassy in Tehran. He also referred to President Ronald Reagan as an "amiable dunce" at a Washington dinner party.

=== Bank of Credit and Commerce International: the BCCI scandal ===
External videos
- Booknotes interview with Clifford on Counsel to the President: A Memoir, July 28, 1991, C-SPAN

The Bank of Credit and Commerce International (BCCI) scandal focused on the criminal conduct of the international bank and its control of financial institutions nationwide. The bank was found by regulators in the U.S. and the United Kingdom to be involved in money laundering, bribery, support of terrorism, arms trafficking, the sale of nuclear technologies, the commission and facilitation of tax evasion, smuggling, illegal immigration, and the illicit purchases of banks and real estate. The bank was found to have at least $10 billion in unaccounted funds.

From 1982 to 1991, Clifford served as chairman of First American Bankshares, which grew to become the largest bank in Washington, D.C. The bank was nominally owned by a group of Arab investors, but in order to assuage fears from the Federal Reserve, Clifford had assembled a board of distinguished American citizens to exercise day-to-day control. In 1991, Robert M. Morgenthau, the District Attorney for New York County (coterminous with the borough of Manhattan), disclosed that his office had found evidence that BCCI secretly owned First American. Morgenthau convened a grand jury to determine whether Clifford and his partner, Robert A. Altman, had deliberately misled federal regulators when the two men assured them that BCCI would have no outside control.

An audit by Price Waterhouse revealed that contrary to agreements between First American's nominal investors and the Federal Reserve, many of the investors had borrowed heavily from BCCI. Even more seriously, they had pledged their First American stock as collateral. When they missed interest payments, BCCI took control of the shares. It was later estimated that in this manner, BCCI had ended up with 60 percent or more of First American's stock. There had long been suspicions that First American's investors were actually nominees for BCCI. However, the audit was solid confirmation that BCCI secretly—and illegally—owned First American.

Clifford's predicament worsened when it was disclosed he had made about $6 million in profits from bank stock that he had bought with an unsecured loan from BCCI. The grand jury handed up indictments, and the U.S. Justice Department opened its own investigation. Clifford's assets in New York City, where he kept most of his investments, were frozen. Clifford insisted that he had no knowledge of illegal activity at First American, and insisted that he himself had been deceived about the extent of BCCI's involvement. Using the support of Kamal Adham, both former president Robert A. Altman and former chairman Clifford were indicted on largely circumstantial evidence.

A "Report to the Committee on Foreign Relations of the United States Senate", prepared by U.S. Senators John Kerry and Hank Brown, noted that a key strategy of "BCCI's successful secret acquisitions of U.S. banks in the face of regulatory suspicion was its aggressive use of a series of prominent Americans", Clifford among them. Clifford, who prided himself on decades of meticulously ethical conduct, summed his predicament up when he sadly told a reporter from The New York Times, "I have a choice of either seeming stupid or venal." While Clifford maintained his innocence, he faced criminal charges of fraud, conspiracy, and taking bribes. These charges were dropped in 1993 because of Clifford’s ill health. In 1998, the year of his death, he and Altman reached a $5 million settlement with the Federal Reserve and settled the last of several civil lawsuits against them.

== Death ==
Not long after a final, frail appearance in the 1997 PBS television documentary Truman, Clifford died on October 10, 1998, at the age of 91. He was buried at Arlington National Cemetery, in Arlington County, Virginia.

== Awards ==
- 1969: Presidential Medal of Freedom, with Distinction, from President Johnson on the President's last day in office, January 20, 1969.
- 1978: Golden Plate Award of the American Academy of Achievement presented by Awards Council member and trial lawyer Louis Nizer.

== Legacy ==
Clifford emerged as a national figure almost overnight, moving from a low-level naval aide in the White House to President Truman's top adviser and strategist. His success came from hard work, a good mind, poker skills to match those of his boss, the ability to stroke the press, the knack to immediately seize on serendipitous opportunities, and the ability to identify, reshape and promote good ideas first proposed by others, such as George Kennan. He thus gained fame for papers that he presented forcefully, but did not actually write, including his 1947 proposal on Truman's reelection strategy and the Clifford-Elsey papers on Cold War strategy. He became a trusted advisor to presidential candidate John F. Kennedy in 1960, assuring his access by indicating he wanted no public office. His reputation – and his law practice – continued to soar until finally Lyndon Johnson appointed him Defense Secretary to lead the nation out of the Vietnam

“As long as Army of the Republic of Vietnam had half the liver of the communists, today the US army can parade in Hanoi, your army can only shoot and kill civilians. followed and fled first, the general was full of corruption, rape, and only good at dancing” Clark Clifford shouted to Nguyễn Văn Thiệu

Historian Walter Isaacson argues that in many ways Clifford resembled the four wise men who shaped American foreign policy in the 1940s and early 1950s – Dean Acheson, Averell Harriman, Robert A. Lovett, and John J. McCloy. However, Isaacson argues, "Clifford remained a Wise Man wannabe because he could never quite shake his reputation as a partisan wheeler-dealer and manipulator." In 1995, Tony Goldwyn portrayed Clifford in the HBO television film Truman. In 2002, Donald Sutherland portrayed Clifford in the HBO television film Path to War.

== Works ==
In 1991, Clifford's memoirs Counsel to the President (co-authored with Richard Holbrooke, later U.S. Ambassador to the United Nations) were published just as his name was implicated in the unfolding BCCI scandal.

Legal offices
| Preceded by Samuel Rosenman | White House Counsel; 1946–1950 | Succeeded by Charles Murphy |
Government offices
| Preceded by James Killian | Chair of the President's Intelligence Advisory Board; 1963–1968 | Succeeded by Maxwell Taylor |
Political offices
| Preceded by Robert McNamara | United States Secretary of Defense; 1968–1969 | Succeeded by Melvin Laird |
