= Opinion polling for United States presidential elections =

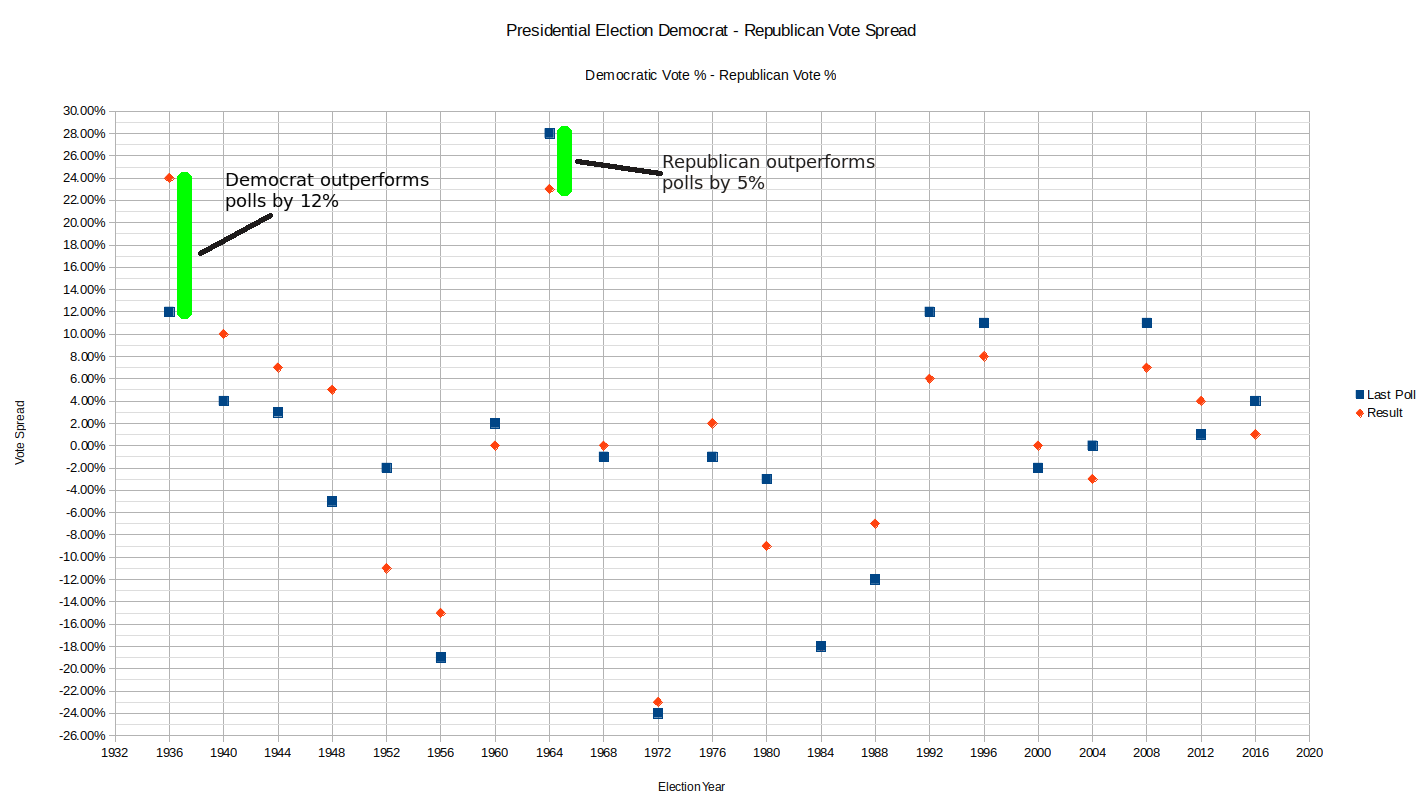
Chart of Democratic-candidate lead over Republican candidate in final poll and results by year, 1936 to 2016

Gallup was the first organization to conduct accurate opinion polling for United States presidential elections. Gallup polling has often been accurate in predicting the outcome of presidential elections and the margin of victory for the winner. However, it missed some close elections: 1948, 1976 and 2004, the popular vote in 2000, and the likely-voter numbers in 2012. The month section in the tables represents the month in which the opinion poll was conducted. D represents the Democratic Party, and R represents the Republican Party. Third parties, such as the Dixiecrats and the Reform Party, were included in some polls.

== 1936 ==
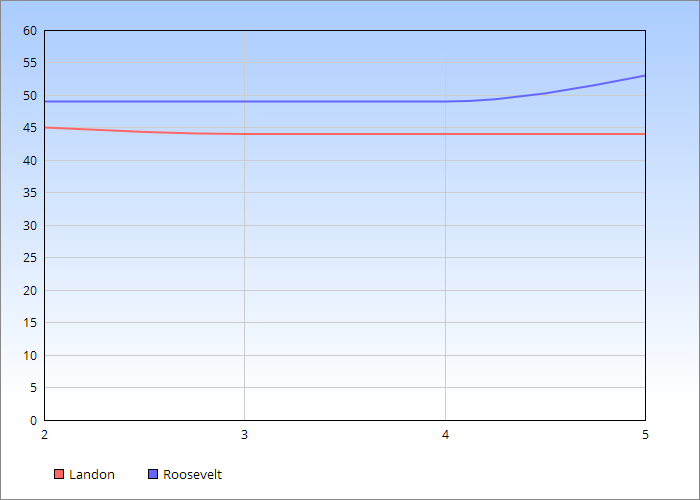
1936 Presidential Election Polls

1936
Month	Franklin D. Roosevelt (D) %	Alf Landon (R) %
July	49%	45%
August	49%	45%
August	49%	45%
August	49%	44%
September	49%	45%
September	50%	44%
October	51%	44%
October	51%	44%
October	56%	44%
Actual result	60.80%	36.54%
Difference between actual result and final poll	+4.80%	-7.46%

After predicting the winners of the previous five elections, The Literary Digest (based on cards mailed in by its readers) predicted that Alf Landon would win by a large margin. George Gallup predicted a Franklin D. Roosevelt win, based on statistical random sampling within 1.1 percent of the Literary Digest results.

The accuracy of Gallup's forecasts indicated the value of modern statistical methods; according to data collected in the Gallup poll, the Literary Digest poll failed primarily due to non-response bias (Roosevelt won 69 percent of Literary Digest readers who did not participate in the poll) rather than selection bias as commonly believed. Roosevelt won 57 percent of Literary Digest readers who received the poll. Roosevelt won in the largest landslide since the uncontested 1820 election, winning every state except Maine and Vermont, since his New Deal programs were popular with the American people (apart from the respondents to the Literary Digest poll). Although Landon said that the New Deal was costly and ineffective and Roosevelt was slowly molding the United States into a dictatorship, his attacks gained little traction.

== 1940 ==
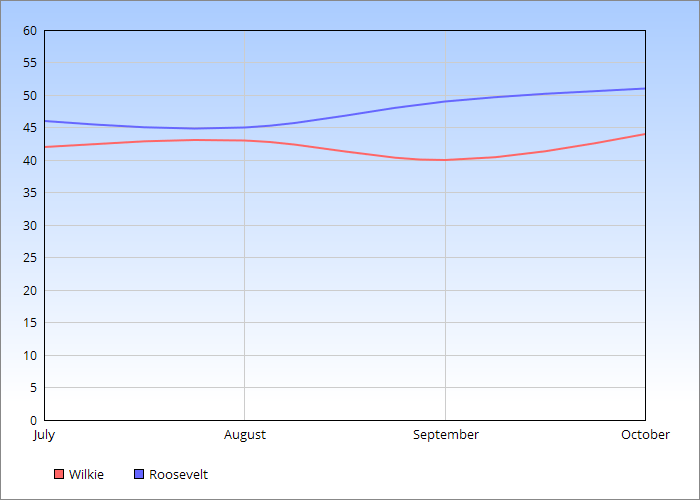
1940 Presidential Polling

1940
Month	Franklin D. Roosevelt (D) %	Wendell Willkie (R)%
July	48%	42%
July	44%	43%
August	45%	43%
August	46%	44%
September	49%	40%
October	50%	40%
October	51%	42%
October	52%	48%
Actual result	54.72%	44.77%
Difference between actual result and final poll	+2.72%	-3.23%

Throughout his campaign, Roosevelt promised to continue the New Deal and not bring the United States into any new wars if he was given another term. Wendell Willkie unsuccessfully attacked Roosevelt for seeking a third term and accused him of trying to turn the United States into a dictatorship by refusing to leave office. Roosevelt led in all polls, and was re-elected by a large margin.

== 1944 ==
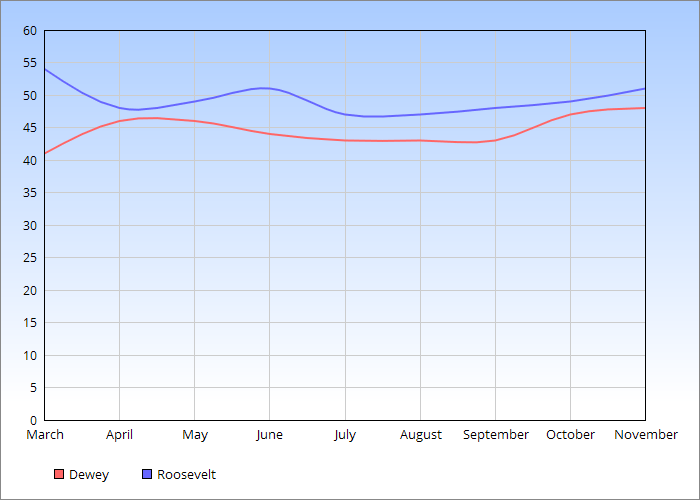
1944 Presidential Polling

1944
Month	Franklin D. Roosevelt (D) %	Thomas E. Dewey (R) %
March	55%	41%
March	53%	42%
April	48%	46%
May	48%	47%
May	50%	45%
June	51%	45%
June	51%	44%
July	46%	45%
July	49%	41%
August	47%	42%
August	47%	45%
September	47%	42%
September	50%	45%
September	48%	41%
September	47%	45%
October	48%	47%
October	50%	47%
November	51%	48%
Actual result	53.39%	45.89%
Difference between actual result and final poll	+2.39%	-2.11%

Roosevelt actively campaigned in this election against medical advice to counter Republican claims that he was near death. Roosevelt maintained a consistent (although sometimes narrow) lead in the polls, and won a solid victory due to American success in World War II and his continued popularity.

== 1948 ==
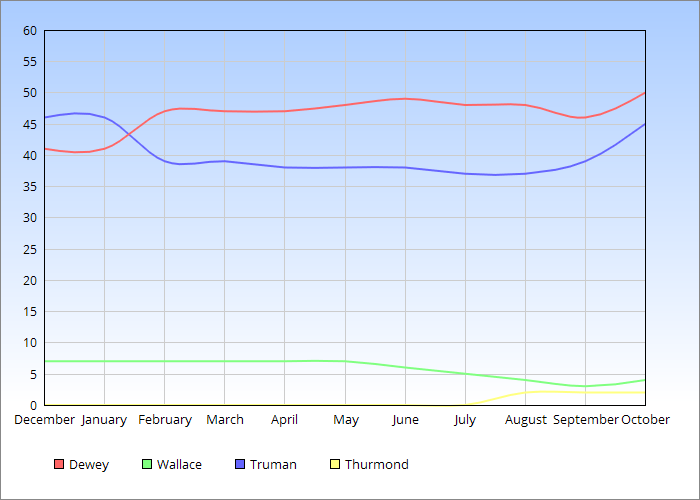
1948 Presidential Polling

1948
Month	Harry S. Truman (D) %	Thomas E. Dewey (R) %	Henry A. Wallace (Progressive) %	Strom Thurmond (Dixiecrat) %
December 1947/January 1948	46%	41%	7%	
February/March	39%	47%	7%	
April/May				
June/July	38%	49%	6%	
June/July	37%	48%	5%	
August/September	37%	48%	4%	2%
August/September	36%	49%	5%	3%
August/September	39%	47%	3%	2%
August/September	39%	47%	3%	2%
August/September	40%	46%	4%	2%
October	45%	50%	4%	2%
Actual result	49.55%	45.07%	2.37%	2.41%
Difference between actual result and final poll	+4.55%	-4.93%	-1.63%	+0.41%

While incumbent President Harry S. Truman's popularity was low at the end of 1946, it improved with his attack on the "Do-Nothing" Republican Congress of 1947–1948 and his association of Thomas E. Dewey with it. Truman also energized segments of the Democratic base by ending segregation in the military and recognizing Israel. Gallup and other polling organizations stopped polling in mid-October, believing that Dewey would win the election, and failed to predict Truman's comeback or his subsequent victory.

== 1952 ==
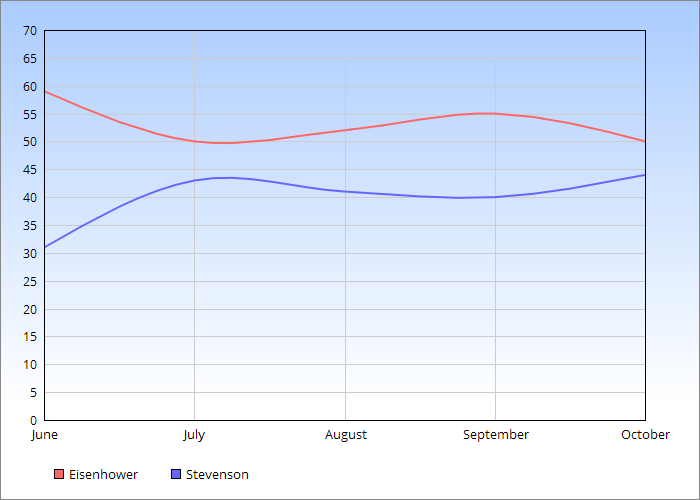
1952 Presidential Polling

1952
Month	Dwight D. Eisenhower (R) %	Adlai Stevenson II (D) %
June	59%	31%
July	50%	43%
August		
September	55%	40%
September	55%	41%
October	53%	41%
October	51%	38%
October	48%	39%
October	48%	39%
October	51%	49%
Actual result	55.14%	44.38%
Difference between actual result and final poll	+4.14%	-4.62%

Dissatisfaction with the Korean War, corruption and the threat of Communism (the K1c2 formula) allowed World War II hero Dwight D. Eisenhower to win the election in a landslide against Democratic opponent Adlai Stevenson II after consistently leading in the polls, mostly by large margins.

== 1956 ==
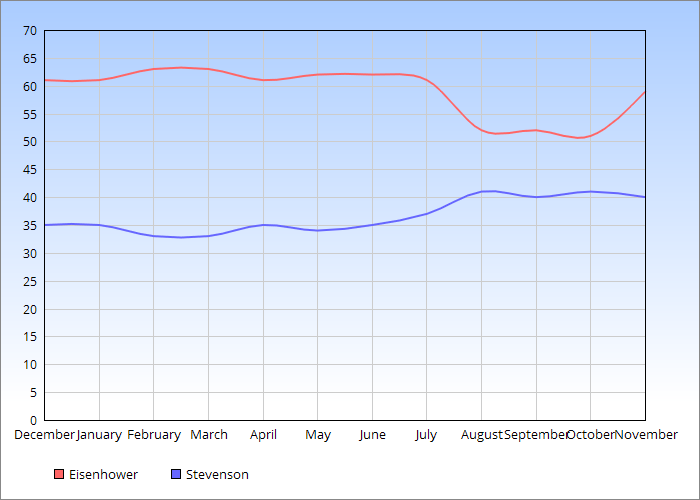
1956 Presidential Polling

1956
Month	Dwight D. Eisenhower (R) %	Adlai Stevenson II (D) %
December 1955/January 1956	61%	35%
February/March	63%	33%
April/May	61%	37%
April/May	62%	33%
April/May	62%	35%
June/July	62%	35%
June/July	61%	37%
August/September	52%	41%
August/September	52%	41%
August/September	52%	40%
October/November	51%	41%
October/November	59%	40%
Actual result	57.37%	41.97%
Difference between actual result and final poll	-1.63%	+1.97%

After consistently leading in the polls by large margins, incumbent President Eisenhower was easily re-elected due to economic prosperity at home and the end of the Korean War abroad.

== 1960 ==
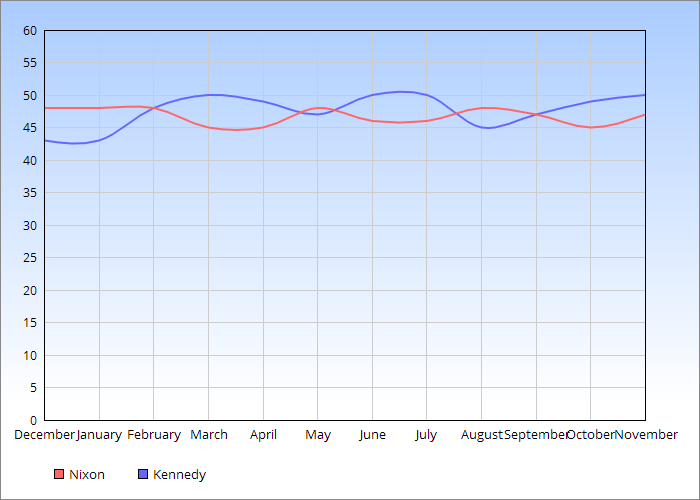
1960 Presidential Polling

1960
Month	John F. Kennedy (D) %	Richard Nixon (R) %
December 1959/January 1960	43%	48%
February/March	48%	48%
February/March	50%	45%
April/May	51%	44%
April/May	48%	47%
April/May	47%	49%
June/July	50%	46%
August/September	44%	50%
August/September	47%	47%
August/September	48%	47%
August/September	46%	47%
October/November	49%	46%
October/November	49%	45%
October/November	51%	49%
Actual result	49.72%	49.55%
Difference between actual result and final poll	-1.28%	+0.55%

Polls throughout the campaign indicated a very close race. Vice President Richard Nixon initially led, but then had problems (a poor image in the first television debate and a knee injury which prevented him from campaigning) which gave Senator John F. Kennedy—the Democratic candidate, the lead in the polls for most of the campaign. In the end, Kennedy had an extremely close victory.

== 1964 ==
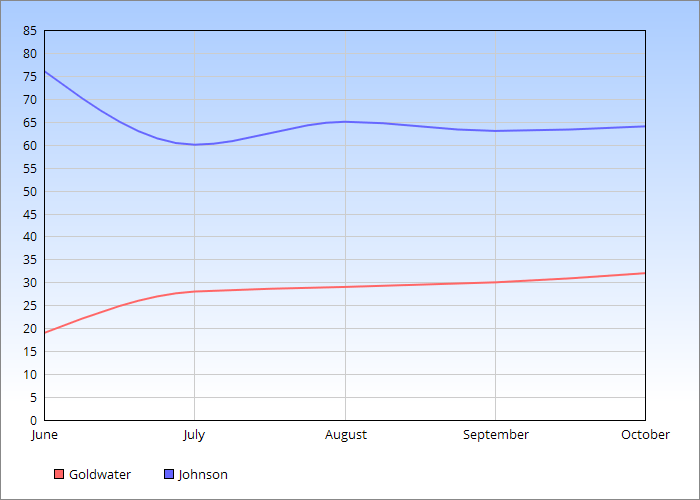
1964 Presidential Polling

1964
Month	Lyndon B. Johnson (D) %	Barry Goldwater (R) %
June	77%	18%
June	76%	20%
July	62%	26%
July	59%	31%
August	65%	29%
September	65%	29%
September	62%	32%
October	64%	29%
October	64%	36%
Actual result	61.05%	38.47%
Difference between actual result and final poll	-2.95%	+2.47%

President Johnson maintained a large lead in the polls and won a full term in a landslide due to popular sympathy after the assassination of President Kennedy, a good economy, lack of severe foreign problems, and an effective campaign to portray Goldwater as a dangerous, out-of-touch extremist.

== 1968 ==
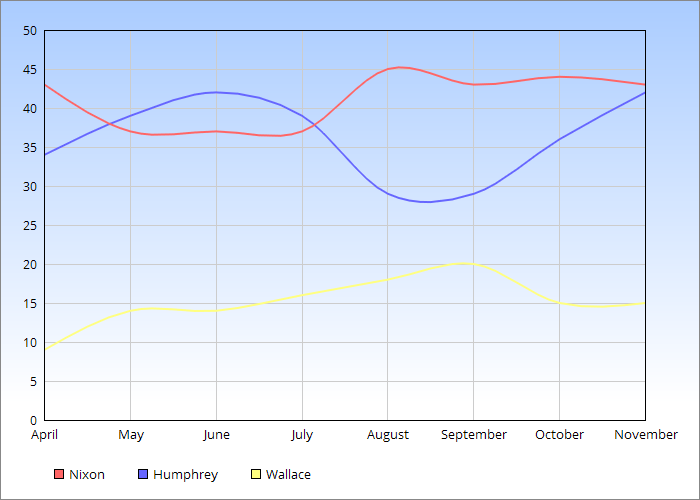
1968 Presidential Polling

1968
Month	Richard Nixon (R) %	Hubert Humphrey (Note: Lyndon B. Johnson before April) (D) %	George Wallace (American Independent) %
April	43%	34%	9%
May	39%	36%	14%
May	36%	42%	14%
June	37%	42%	14%
July	35%	40%	16%
July	40%	38%	16%
August	45%	29%	18%
September	43%	31%	19%
September	43%	28%	21%
September	44%	29%	20%
October	44%	36%	15%
November	43%	42%	15%
Actual result	43.42%	42.72%	13.53%
Difference between actual result and final poll	+0.42%	+0.72%	-1.47%

Initially, President Johnson had been the frontrunner for the Democratic Party's nomination, but he withdrew from the race after a poor showing in the New Hampshire primary against the anti-Vietnam War candidate Eugene McCarthy. Vice President Hubert Humphrey was proclaimed the Democratic nominee after a tumultuous primary season in which he competed with McCarthy and Robert Kennedy, who was assassinated while campaigning. After the 1968 Republican National Convention, in which Richard Nixon beat Ronald Reagan and Nelson Rockefeller for the Republican nomination, Nixon established a lead against Humphrey which only widened after the violently chaotic 1968 Democratic National Convention. Former Governor of Alabama George Wallace ran a populist campaign in opposition to civil rights and in support of segregation on the American Independent Party ticket, receiving considerable support in the South and Industrial Midwest, but his numbers collapsed once his running mate suggested the use of nuclear weapons to win the Vietnam War, and once Humphrey began to attract the support of previously pro-Wallace Midwestern union workers. Humphrey began catching up to Nixon in the polls late in the campaign after Wallace's collapse and was aided both by his own announcement that he would end the bombing of North Vietnam if elected president, and Johnson's announcement of a bombing halt over North Vietnam in late October. However, the Paris Peace talks collapsed in early November - allegedly due in part to the actions of Anna Chennault, working on behalf of Nixon - dashing hopes of an early peace agreement. Nixon narrowly triumphed over Humphrey in one of the closest American presidential elections in history.

== 1972 ==
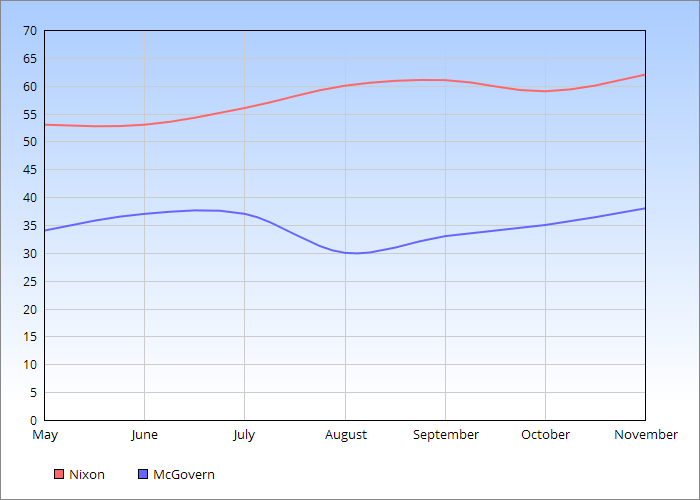
1972 Presidential Polling

1972
Month	Richard Nixon (R) %	George McGovern (D) %
May	53%	34%
June	53%	37%
July	56%	37%
August	57%	31%
August	64%	30%
September	61%	33%
October	60%	34%
October	59%	36%
November	62%	38%
Actual result	60.67%	37.52%
Difference between actual result and final poll	-1.33%	-0.48%

President Nixon was re-elected in a landslide, winning every state except Massachusetts after maintaining a large poll lead due to the economic recovery from the 1969–1970 recession and his portrayal of Senator George McGovern—the Democratic candidate, as a foreign-policy lightweight and social radical ("amnesty, abortion, and acid"). McGovern was also hurt by his change of vice-presidential candidates in mid-campaign, raising questions about his judgement.

== 1976 ==
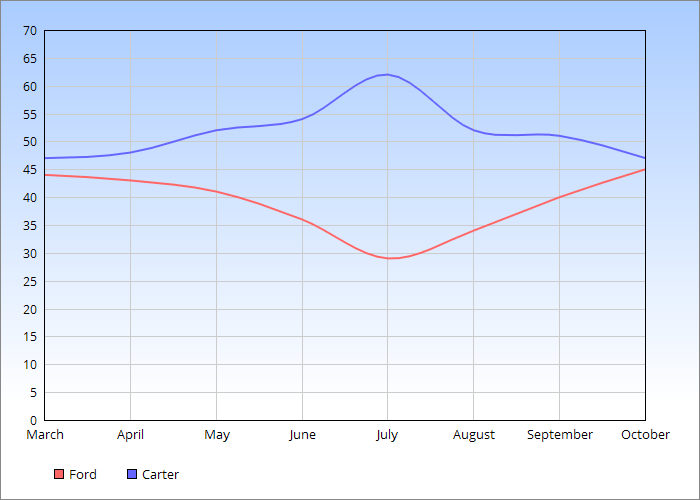
1976 Presidential Election

1976
Month	Jimmy Carter (D) %	Gerald Ford (R) %
March	47%	42%
March	48%	46%
March	48%	46%
April	48%	43%
May	52%	42%
May	53%	40%
June	55%	37%
June	53%	36%
July	62%	29%
August	54%	32%
August	51%	36%
September	51%	40%
October	47%	45%
October	47%	41%
October	48%	49%
Actual result	50.08%	48.01%
Difference between actual result and final poll	+2.08%	-0.99%

Former Governor of Georgia Jimmy Carter—the Democratic candidate, opened up a large lead over President Ford due to dissatisfaction with Watergate, Ford's pardon of former president Richard Nixon and the sluggish economy. Ford closed the gap near the end of the campaign with good debate performances, among other things. He was hurt by his comment that there was no Soviet domination of Eastern Europe and ran out of time to close the polling gap with Carter, who won by a narrow margin.

== 1980 ==
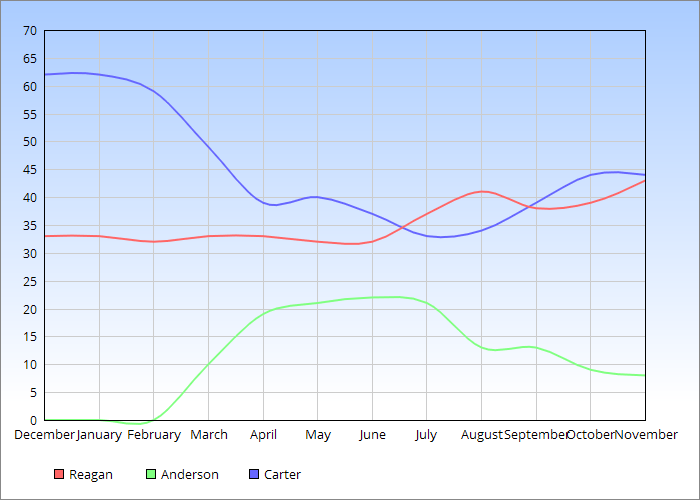
1980 Presidential Election

1980
Month	Ronald Reagan (R) %	Jimmy Carter (D) %	John B. Anderson (I) %
December 1979/January 1980	33%	62%	
February/March	31%	60%	
February/March	33%	58%	
February/March	34%	40%	21%
April/May	34%	41%	18%
April/May	32%	38%	21%
April/May	32%	40%	21%
June/July	32%	39%	21%
June/July	33%	35%	24%
June/July	37%	32%	22%
June/July	37%	34%	21%
August/September	45%	29%	14%
August/September	38%	39%	13%
August/September	39%	39%	14%
October/November	40%	44%	9%
October/November	39%	45%	9%
October/November	47%	44%	8%
Actual result	50.75%	41.01%	6.61%
Difference between actual result and final poll	+3.75%	-2.99%	-1.39%

During primary season, President Carter held a steady lead over former Governor of California Ronald Reagan—the Republican front-runner, despite a primary challenge from Senator Ted Kennedy. Reagan and GE spokesman, passed Carter in the polls after the primaries, winning over voters dissatisfied with Carter's handling of the economy, the energy crisis, and the Iran hostage crisis. As the race neared its finish, Carter had apparently closed the gap with Reagan; some outlets gave him the lead. Reagan ran an upbeat campaign focused on fixing the economy and restoring America's image, diminished by Watergate and the war in Vietnam. Carter was more negative, attacking Reagan's record on civil rights and social issues. Reagan defeated Carter in a blowout on election night, the third win for Republicans in the past four presidential races.

== 1984 ==
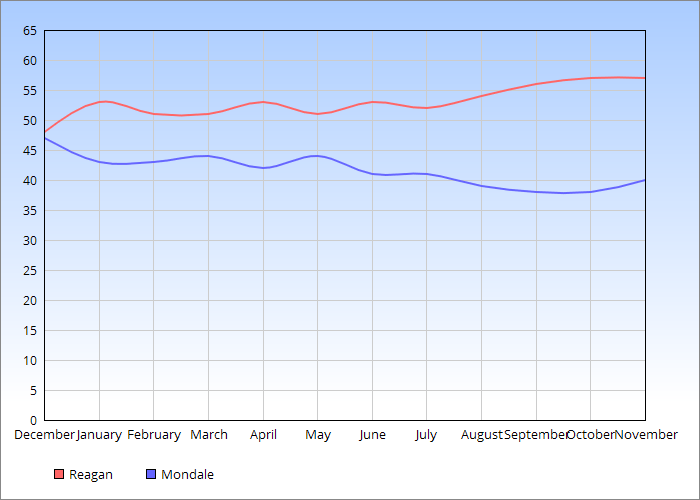
1984 Presidential Election

1984
Month	Ronald Reagan (R) %	Walter Mondale (D) %
December 1983/January 1984	48%	47%
December 1983/January 1984	53%	43%
February/March	52%	42%
February/March	50%	45%
February/March	52%	44%
April/May	54%	41%
April/May	52%	44%
April/May	50%	46%
April/May	53%	43%
June/July	53%	44%
June/July	55%	38%
June/July	51%	43%
June/July	53%	39%
June/July	53%	41%
August/September	52%	41%
August/September	56%	37%
August/September	58%	37%
August/September	55%	39%
October/November	58%	38%
October/November	56%	39%
October/November	59%	41%
Actual result	58.77%	40.56%
Difference between actual result and final poll	-0.23%	-0.44%

President Reagan had low approval ratings early in his first term, but by 1983 the economy had improved enough to give him a boost for re-election. Former Vice President Walter Mondale— the Democratic candidate, who advocated a nuclear freeze, the Equal Rights Amendment and a balanced budget. Mondale benefited from a strong first debate (where the 73-year-old Reagan seemed slow), but Reagan was re-elected in a landslide, winning every state except Minnesota. Reagan again cast himself as the candidate of optimism, taking credit for an improved economy and an increase in national pride after the social upheaval of the 1960s and 1970s. Mondale's unpopular proposal to raise taxes to reduce the deficit and association with the Carter administration's "malaise" largely doomed his campaign from the start.

== 1988 ==
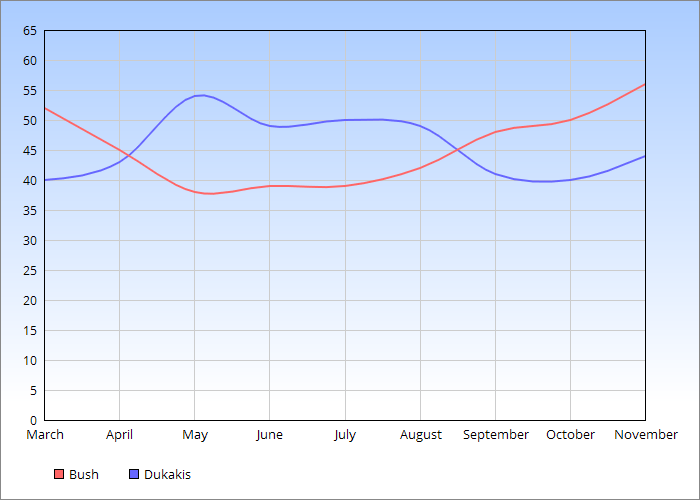
1988 Presidential Election

1988
Month	George H. W. Bush (R) %	Michael Dukakis (D) %
March	52%	40%
April	45%	43%
May	38%	54%
June	38%	52%
June	41%	46%
July	41%	47%
July	37%	54%
August	42%	49%
September	49%	41%
September	47%	42%
October	50%	40%
November	56%	44%
Actual result	53.37%	45.65%
Difference between actual result and final poll	-2.63%	+1.65%

Although Governor of Massachusetts Michael Dukakis—the Democratic candidate, took a large lead in the initial polls, Vice President George H. W. Bush's campaign portrayed him as soft on crime and used the good economy, President Reagan's popularity and Bush's no new taxes pledge to close the gap and eventually take a large lead. Bush easily won the general election.

== 1992 ==
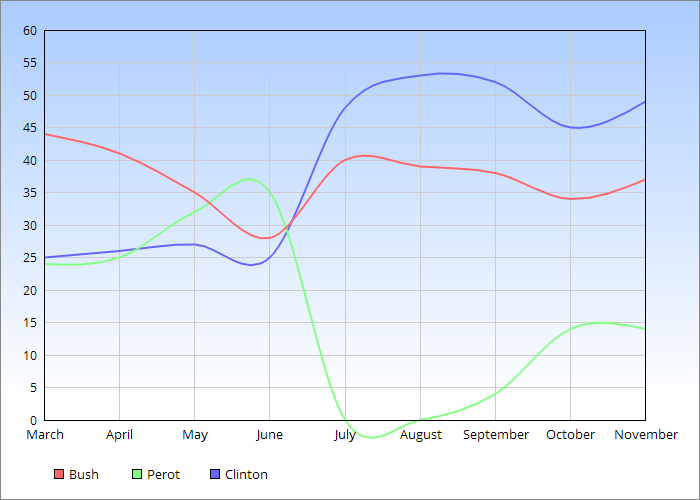
1992 Presidential Polls

1992
Month	Bill Clinton (D) %	George H. W. Bush (R) %	Ross Perot (I) %
March	25%	44%	24%
April	26%	41%	25%
May	29%	35%	30%
May	25%	35%	35%
June	26%	30%	38%
June	25%	31%	39%
June	24%	24%	37%
June	24%	32%	34%
June	27%	33%	32%
July	40%	48%	Candidate withdrew from race
July	56%	34%	Candidate withdrew from race
July	56%	36%	Candidate withdrew from race
July	57%	32%	Candidate withdrew from race
August	56%	37%	Candidate withdrew from race
August	50%	39%	Candidate withdrew from race
August	52%	42%	Candidate withdrew from race
September	54%	39%	Candidate withdrew from race
September	51%	42%	Candidate withdrew from race
September	50%	40%	Candidate withdrew from race
September	54%	38%	Candidate withdrew from race
September	51%	35%	8%
October	47%	35%	10%
October	50%	34%	9%
October	51%	33%	10%
October	46%	34%	13%
October	47%	34%	14%
October	47%	29%	15%
October	44%	32%	17%
October	41%	30%	20%
October	42%	31%	19%
October	40%	38%	16%
October	41%	40%	14%
October	43%	36%	15%
November	49%	37%	14%
Actual result	43.01%	37.45%	18.91%
Difference between actual result and final poll	-5.99%	+0.45%	+4.91%

The polls fluctuated during the spring and early summer, with President Bush and businessman Ross Perot—the independent candidate, trading the lead. Perot withdrew from the race in July, however, and Governor of Arkansas Bill Clinton—the Democratic candidate, took a consistent lead in the polls by blaming Bush for the poor economy and promising that he would fix it ("It's the economy, stupid"). Although Perot returned to the race in September, he could not regain his previous support and Clinton won the general election by a comfortable margin.

== 1996 ==
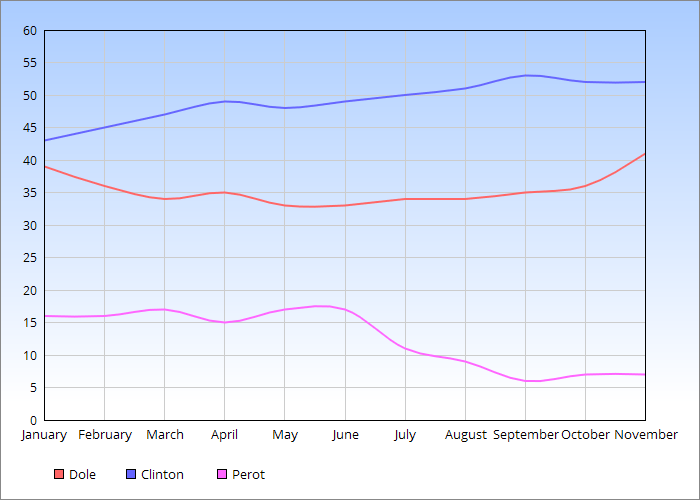
1996 Presidential Polls

1996
Month	Bill Clinton (D) %	Bob Dole (R) %	Ross Perot (Reform) %
January	43%	39%	16%
February			
March	47%	34%	17%
April	49%	35%	15%
May	47%	32%	19%
May	49%	35%	15%
June	49%	33%	17%
July	50%	33%	12%
July	50%	35%	10%
August	52%	30%	12%
August	48%	39%	7%
August	50%	38%	7%
August	51%	38%	7%
August	55%	34%	6%
September	53%	36%	5%
September	54%	36%	4%
September	55%	34%	5%
September	55%	34%	5%
September	55%	32%	6%
September	51%	34%	8%
September	50%	36%	6%
September	52%	36%	4%
September	53%	34%	6%
September	51%	38%	5%
September	49%	39%	6%
September	51%	37%	6%
September	57%	32%	5%
October	53%	36%	6%
October	51%	39%	5%
October	55%	35%	5%
October	55%	34%	6%
October	51%	38%	5%
October	56%	35%	4%
October	48%	39%	5%
October	51%	36%	8%
October	54%	35%	6%
October	52%	33%	8%
October	53%	34%	6%
October	54%	34%	7%
October	49%	37%	7%
October	51%	35%	10%
October	50%	37%	7%
November	52%	41%	7%
Actual result	49.24%	40.71%	8.40%
Difference between actual result and final poll	-2.76%	-0.29%	+1.40%

President Clinton held a comfortable lead in the polls throughout the campaign due to the good economy, stable international situation, and tying former Senator Bob Dole—his Republican challenger to Newt Gingrich (the unpopular speaker of the House), easily won re-election.

== 2000 ==
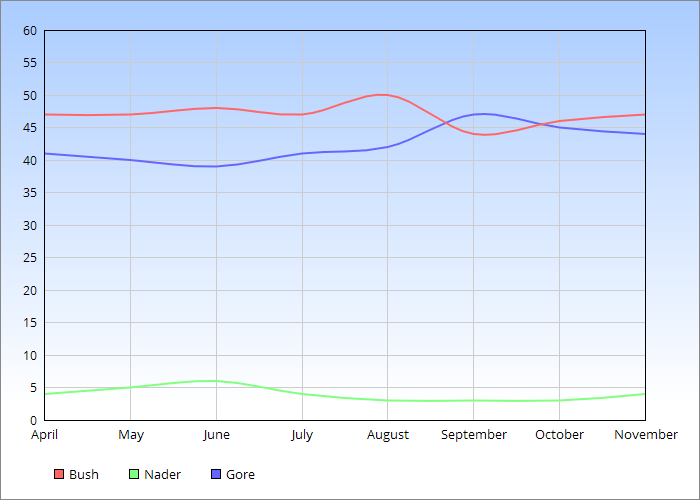
2000 Presidential Polls

2000
Month	George W. Bush (R) %	Al Gore (D) %	Ralph Nader (Green) %
April	47%	41%	4%
May			
June	46%	41%	6%
June	50%	38%	6%
July	45%	43%	5%
July	50%	39%	4%
August	54%	37%	4%
August	55%	39%	2%
August	46%	47%	3%
August	46%	45%	3%
September	44%	47%	3%
September	46%	45%	2%
September	42%	49%	3%
September	41%	49%	4%
September	42%	49%	2%
September	41%	49%	3%
September	44%	48%	2%
September	41%	51%	3%
September	42%	50%	2%
September	47%	44%	2%
September	46%	44%	2%
September	46%	44%	3%
September	45%	45%	4%
October	41%	49%	2%
October	40%	51%	2%
October	48%	41%	4%
October	50%	42%	4%
October	45%	45%	2%
October	45%	45%	3%
October	48%	43%	2%
October	47%	44%	3%
October	51%	40%	4%
October	44%	46%	4%
October	49%	42%	3%
October	52%	39%	4%
October	49%	42%	3%
October	47%	44%	3%
October	47%	43%	4%
November	47%	43%	4%
November	48%	46%	4%
Actual result	47.86%	48.38%	2.74%
Difference between actual result and final poll	-0.14%	+2.38%	-1.26%

The election was close throughout the campaign; Vice President Al Gore used the good economy to his advantage, but was hurt by being perceived as robotic and pompous. During later months, polls flip-flopped between him and Republican candidate Governor of Texas George W. Bush, and Bush won a narrow victory in the electoral college, although polling was correct in predicting the winner of the popular vote.

== 2004 ==
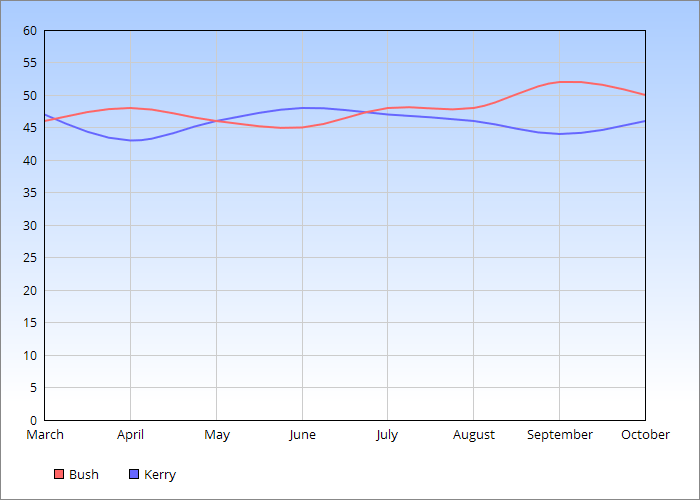
2004 Presidential Polls

2004
Month	George W. Bush (R) %	John Kerry (D) %
March	44%	50%
March	49%	45%
April	47%	43%
April	50%	44%
May	47%	47%
May	47%	45%
May	46%	47%
June	43%	49%
June	48%	47%
July	45%	50%
July	46%	47%
July	51%	45%
August	48%	46%
August	48%	46%
September	52%	45%
September	52%	44%
October	49%	49%
October	48%	49%
October	52%	44%
October	51%	46%
October	49%	49%
Actual result	50.73%	48.27%
Difference between actual result and final poll	+1.73%	-0.73%

The election was closely contested, as dissatisfaction with the Bush administration's handling of the Iraq War and a sluggish economy helped Senator John Kerry—his Democratic challenger. President Bush accused Kerry of flip-flopping, however, and the Swift Boat Veterans for Truth accused Kerry of being unpatriotic. A week before the election, al-Qaeda released a video warning Americans not to re-elect Bush. Bush's poll ratings in swing states then gave him a comfortable lead, and he was re-elected.

== 2008 ==
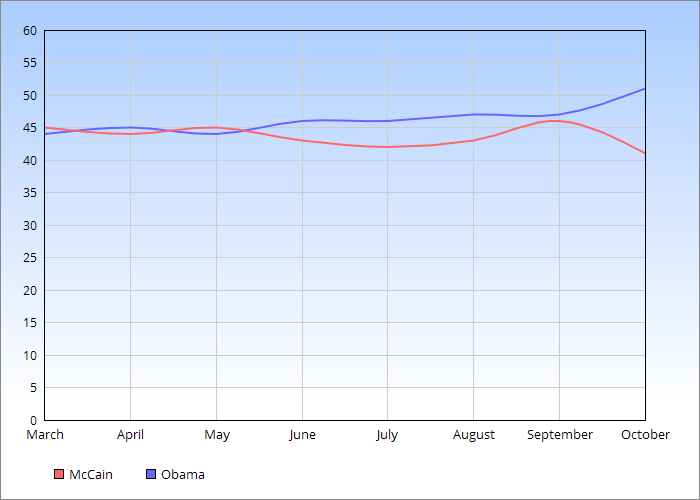
2008 Presidential Polls

2008
Month	Barack Obama (D) %	John McCain (R) %
March	46%	44%
March	43%	47%
April	46%	43%
April	45%	45%
May	42%	48%
May	47%	43%
May	44%	47%
June	48%	41%
June	45%	45%
July	48%	42%
July	45%	44%
July	49%	40%
July	44%	44%
August	48%	42%
August	45%	45%
August	50%	42%
September	44%	49%
September	50%	44%
September	46%	46%
October	52%	41%
October	49%	43%
October	52%	42%
October	53%	40%
October	53%	42%
Actual result	52.93%	45.65%
Difference between actual result and final poll	-0.07%	+3.65%

The campaign was close during the spring and summer, with Senators Barack Obama—the Democratic candidate and John McCain—the Republican candidate, trading the lead. The Great Recession started in December 2007, but Obama was initially hurt in the polls by former First Lady and Senator Hillary Clinton supporters. The Republicans attacked him for being inexperienced, and McCain got a temporary bump in the polls after choosing Governor of Alaska Sarah Palin as his vice-presidential running mate. The 2008 financial crisis allowed Obama to open a consistent, comfortable lead in the polls at the beginning of October, however, and he won the election by a comfortable margin.

== 2012 ==
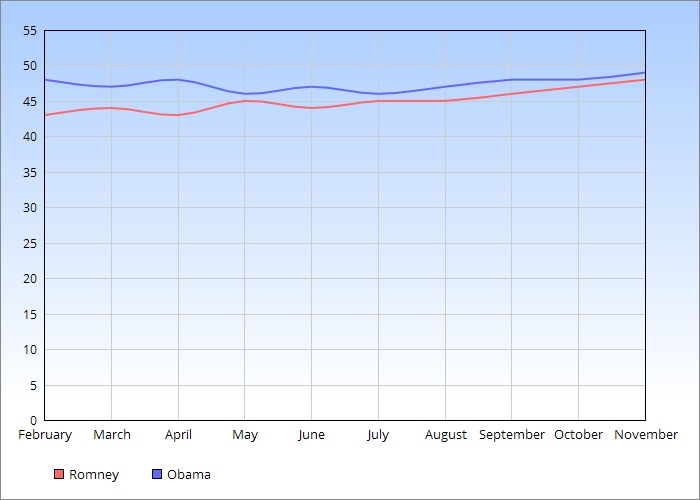
2012 Presidential Polls

2012
Month	Barack Obama (D) %	Mitt Romney (R) %
February	48%	44%
February	49%	43%
February	49%	44%
March	47%	45%
March	48%	44%
April	48%	43%
April	49%	43%
April	47%	44%
April	48%	44%
May	47%	44%
May	46%	46%
May	47%	45%
May	46%	44%
June	48%	45%
June	46%	45%
June	47%	44%
July	46%	45%
July	47%	45%
July	46%	45%
July	47%	45%
August	48%	44%
August	47%	45%
August	47%	46%
September	47%	47%
September	49%	45%
September	48%	45%
September	49%	45%
October	49%	46%
October	47%	48%
October	47%	47%
October	47%	48%
November	49%	48%
Actual result	51.06%	47.20%
Difference between actual result and final poll	+2.06%	-0.80%

President Obama and his campaign aired early negative ads criticizing former Governor of Massachusetts Mitt Romney—his Republican challenger. While Romney regained some support, several gaffes in addition to Obama's embracement of popularly supported intitiatives such as same-sex marriage legalization maintained Obama's lead throughout most of the campaign. Polling correctly predicted Obama's victory, although he won by a larger margin than predicted for most of the race.

== 2016 ==
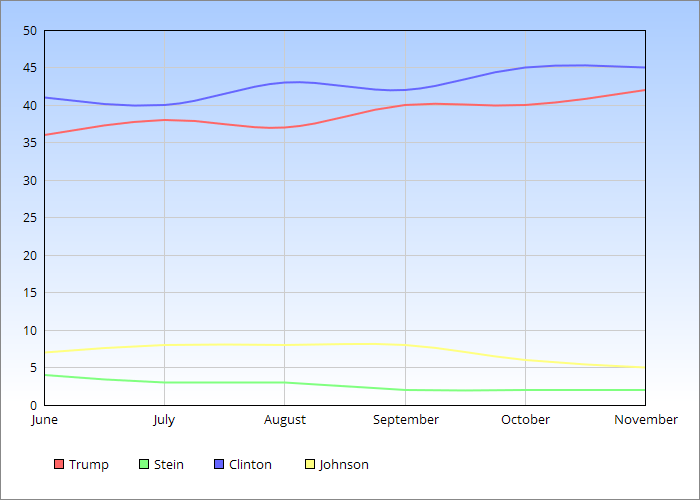
2016 Presidential Polls

2016
Month	Donald Trump (R) %	Hillary Clinton (D) %	Gary Johnson (L) %	Jill Stein (G) %
June	36%	41%	7%	4%
June	37%	42%	8%	5%
July	37%	41%	7%	4%
July	38%	41%	9%	4%
July	40%	40%	7%	3%
August	38%	42%	7%	3%
August	36%	44%	9%	4%
August	37%	44%	9%	3%
August	37%	42%	9%	3%
August	38%	42%	8%	3%
September	39%	41%	8%	3%
September	40%	42%	9%	3%
September	40%	41%	8%	3%
September	42%	43%	7%	2%
October	41%	44%	7%	3%
October	39%	44%	7%	2%
October	39%	46%	7%	2%
October	40%	45%	6%	2%
November	43%	45%	5%	2%
November	42%	46%	5%	2%
Actual result	46.09%	48.18%	3.28%	1.13%
Difference between actual result and final poll	+4.09%	+2.18%	-1.72%	-0.87%

Businessman Donald Trump—the Republican candidate and former First Lady, former Senator, and former Secretary of State Hillary Clinton—the Democratic candidate, were seen unfavorably by many pollsters and pundits, and it was predicted that Trump would lose by a large margin to Democratic opponent Clinton. While pollsters correctly predicted that Clinton would win the popular vote, both candidates outperformed polls, partially due to the overestimation of third-party results.

== 2020 ==
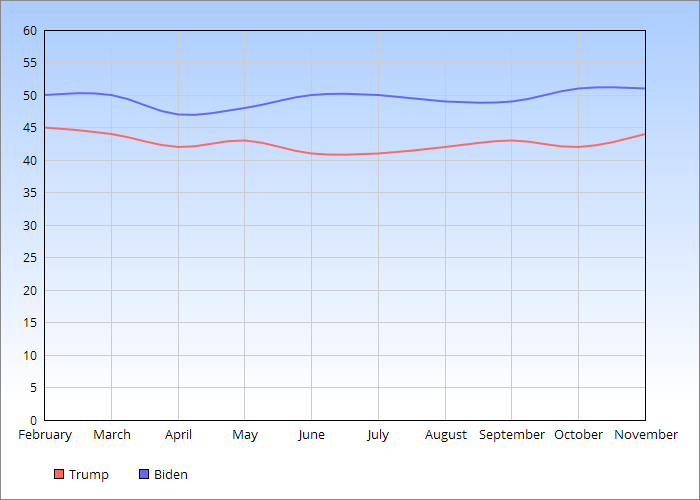
2020 Presidential Polls

2020
Month	Joe Biden (D) %	Donald Trump (R) %
February	50%	45%
February	50%	46%
March	50%	44%
March	51%	44%
March	50%	44%
April	47%	42%
April	48%	42%
May	47%	43%
May	49%	44%
May	48%	42%
June	49%	42%
June	50%	42%
June	51%	41%
June	50%	40%
July	50%	41%
July	49%	40%
July	50%	41%
July	51%	42%
August	49%	42%
August	50%	42%
September	49%	43%
September	50%	43%
September	49%	43%
October	51%	42%
October	52%	42%
October	51%	43%
November	51%	44%
Actual result	51.31%	46.86%
Difference between actual result and final poll	+0.31%	+2.86%

Former Vice President Joe Biden led in most national polls throughout the race, but President Trump believed that polls were underestimating his results. Polls correctly predicted that Biden would win the popular vote, and correctly predicted his margin, but Trump's popular vote estimate was significantly underestimated due to his gains among low-propensity respondents.

== 2024 ==
2024
Month	Donald Trump (R) %	Kamala Harris (Note: Joe Biden until July) (D) %
February	46%	44%
February	45%	44%
February	47%	45%
March	48%	45%
March	47%	46%
March	47%	45%
April	47%	46%
April	46%	46%
April	45%	45%
April	45%	44%
April	47%	45%
May	46%	45%
May	47%	46%
May	48%	46%
June	46%	46%
June	45%	45%
June	46%	45%
July	47%	44%
July	47%	45%
July	48%	45%
July	48%	46%
August	47%	47%
August	47%	48%
September	46%	48%
September	47%	48%
September	47%	49%
October	48%	49%
October	49%	49%
October	49%	48%
November	49%	49%
Actual result	49.80%	48.32%
Difference between actual result and final poll	+0.80%	-0.68%

Former President Donald Trump was leading President Biden in the polls since the beginning of the year, mainly due to high inflation and concerns over Biden's age and health. Polls narrowed following Biden's withdrawal from the race and Vice President Kamala Harris's replacement as the Democratic nominee. However, Donald Trump won both the Electoral College and the popular vote. The 2024 U.S. presidential pre-election polls exhibited notable discrepancies, reflecting persistent challenges in U.S. electoral forecasting. It has been suggested that statistically significant directional bias resides in several 2024 polling contexts. Interestingly, the primary source of these biases stems from the underestimation of Republican vote, rather than the overestimation of Democratic support.
