= K1c2 formula =

Dwight D. Eisenhower campaign platform

The K1C2 formula (sometimes stylized as K_{1}C_{2}) was a campaign platform and strategy used by Republican candidate Dwight D. Eisenhower during the 1952 United States presidential election. K1C2 stands for 'Korea, Communism, and Corruption', representing Eisenhower's key attacks on the Democrats throughout the election: the stalemate in the Korean War, the growing fear of Communism, and the allegations of corruption within the Truman administration.

The idea was ultimately successful, with Eisenhower winning the presidency against Democratic candidate Adlai Stevenson and Republicans securing control of both houses of Congress, leading the election to be described as a 'deviating' one against the backdrop of Democratic dominance through the middle of the century.

== Korea ==
After United Nations forces retook "Line Kansas" in May 1951, the Korean War was at a stalemate; the conflict continued, but little territory changed hands.

== Communism ==
The election came in the middle of the McCarthy era when the US was undergoing the second red scare over supposed undercover Communists in American public life. Eisenhower reluctantly supported Joseph McCarthy in his attacks on Democrats, with Republicans believing him to be a "necessary weapon", despite the fact McCarthy had also started attacking Eisenhower's military mentor George Marshall.

== Corruption ==
Truman himself was not linked to any corruption, but his connections to the Pendergast machine were scrutinized. Several members of the Truman administration had conflicts of interest or were involved in corrupt activities:

- In 1946, Truman attempted to appoint Edwin W. Pauley, a businessman and Democratic donor, to the post of United States Under Secretary of the Navy. Pauley was seen as unsuited to the post due to his close ties to the oil industry and Truman's continued support for his nomination led to the resignation of Harold Ickes as Secretary of the Interior.
- Matthew J. Connelly (Truman's Appointments Secretary) and T. Lamar Caudle (the head of the tax division at the Department of Justice) were found guilty in 1956 of having accepted oil royalty interests in exchange for allegedly giving lenient treatment to a St Louis shoe salesman charged with tax fraud. It was later suggested that Caudle was made a scapegoat by Republican lawmakers in order to secure convictions after their election, so as to look tough on corruption.
- Major General Harry H. Vaughan (Truman's friend and military aide) accepted seven home freezers for himself and friends in return for using his influence to fix government contracts.
- E. Merl Young, an official in the Reconstruction Finance Corporation, was found guilty of accepting a gift of a mink coat for his wife from a Washington lawyer in return for favourable loans to certain companies.

To try to stem the corruption, in February 1952, Truman appointed Newbold Morris to head an independent investigation as special counsel. He also signed an executive order compelling members of the executive branch to co-operate with Morris' inquiry. Truman's Attorney General J. Howard McGrath objected to Morris' line of investigation (believing the salary surveys Morris was giving out were a "violation of personal rights") and, on 3 April, he fired Morris. Hours later, Truman called McGrath and forced him to resign. This high-profile scandal made sure that corruption would be a major part of the election campaign.

Though Truman may not have condoned the corruption within his administration, "he behaved so willfully as to seem almost a conscious co-conspirator". The extent of the problem was such that Richard Nixon, who ran with Eisenhower as Vice President, dubbed it the 'scandal-a-day administration'.
