= Fred Dutton =

American political official (1923–2005)

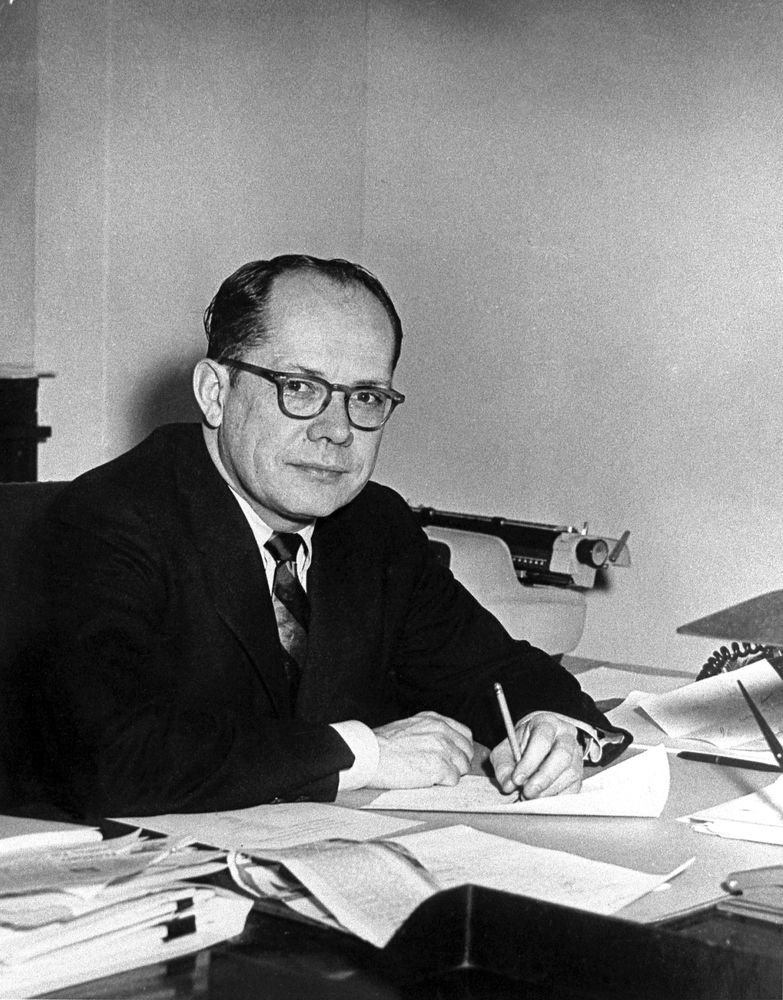

8th Assistant Secretary of State for Legislative Affairs
- In office December 4, 1961 – July 27, 1964
- President: John F. Kennedy; Lyndon B. Johnson
- Preceded by: Brooks Hays
- Succeeded by: Douglas MacArthur II

White House Cabinet Secretary
- In office January 20, 1961 – December 4, 1961
- President: John F. Kennedy
- Preceded by: Robert Keith Gray
- Succeeded by: ???

Personal details
- Born: Frederick Gary Dutton; June 16, 1923 Julesburg, Colorado, U.S.
- Died: June 27, 2005 (aged 82) Washington, D.C., U.S.
- Resting place: Arlington National Cemetery
- Party: Democratic
- Spouse(s): June Klingborg; Nancy Hogan
- Children: 5
- Education: University of California, Berkeley (BA); Stanford University (LLB)

Military service
- Allegiance: United States
- Branch/service: United States Army
- Rank: First Lieutenant
- Unit: Army Judge Advocate General's Corps
- Battles/wars: Battle of the Bulge
- Awards: Purple Heart; Bronze Star

Frederick Gary Dutton (June 16, 1923 – June 27, 2005) was a lawyer and Democratic Party power broker who served as campaign manager and Chief of Staff for California Governor Pat Brown, Special Assistant to U.S. President John F. Kennedy, and went on to manage Robert F. Kennedy's campaign for the Presidency.

Between 1960 and 1972 Dutton played a role in every Democrat's quest for the White House. Dutton entertained both politicians and journalists and could be considered one of the country's original "spin doctors." He had a long career as a lobbyist for American oil companies and the Kingdom of Saudi Arabia, leading to him being referred to as both "Fred of Arabia" and "Dutton of Arabia."

== Early life and education ==
Dutton was born in Julesburg, Colorado, the son of Lucy and Fredrick Dutton, known as "doc". Fred's mother, father and little brother, Edward, moved to San Mateo, California, where he attended San Mateo High School and met his first wife, June Klingborg Dutton. The Duttons had three children together between 1950 and 1960 (Christopher, Lisa, and Eve). Dutton graduated from University of California, Berkeley in 1946 and from Stanford Law School in 1949.

Dutton had two stints of military service in both World War II and the Korean War. During World War II he was a prisoner of war and received the Purple Heart and the Bronze Star. During the Korean War he served as a Judge Advocate in Japan.

== Political career ==
Following his position as assistant counsel with Southern Counties Gas Co., from 1952 to 1956, Dutton became chief assistant attorney general of California, in 1957 and 1958. He was executive secretary to California Governor Pat Brown in 1959 and 1960.

Governor Brown appointed Dutton to the Regents of the University of California in 1962, where he served until 1978.

Dutton was the deputy national chairman of Citizens for Kennedy-Johnson in 1960. Following the election, he was brought into the White House as a Special Assistant to United States President John F. Kennedy in 1961, serving as secretary of the cabinet and special assistant for intergovernmental and interdepartmental relations. He was appointed Assistant Secretary of State for Congressional Relations, from 1961 to 1964. He was also a political adviser and campaign aide to Robert F. Kennedy.

Dutton was asked to co-ordinate the John F. Kennedy Presidential Library, and oversaw its Oral History Project.

Dutton travelled with Kennedy during much of his 1968 presidential campaign from his 1968 presidential election. He was at the Ambassador Hotel in Los Angeles, California when the Senator was shot at the kitchen hotel, and rode in the ambulance with him at Good Samaritan Hospital. Kennedy died the next day. In an interview after he became a lobbyist, he said "After Bobby was shot, the lights went out for me."

Dutton was credited with originating the idea for Earth Day. His early memo was later acknowledged to be inspiration for Gaylord Nelson who would lead the effort to create Earth Day.

== Legal and lobbying career ==
After the RFK assassination in 1968, Dutton returned to his private law practice in Washington, DC. Dutton was credited with helping his client Mobil Oil develop its "advertorial" marketing strategy.

Dutton later married attorney Nancy Hogan Dutton and they had two children together (Stacy & Christina). Nancy had been his secretary when he worked at the Kennedy White House. Together the Duttons formed the Dutton and Dutton law practice; this firm went on to be appointed chief U.S. attorney for the Kingdom of Saudi Arabia, earning Mr. Dutton the often quoted moniker "Dutton of Arabia". Dutton & Dutton continued work for Saudi Arabia following Fred's death.

Frederick Dutton died on June 27, 2005, aged 82, of undisclosed causes. He was buried at Arlington National Cemetery, in Arlington, Virginia.

== List of works ==
- Dutton, Frederick G. (1971). Changing sources of power: American politics in the 1970s (1st ed.). New York: McGraw-Hill. pp. xviii, 263. ISBN 0-07-018397-X. OCLC 136675.
- Dutton, Frederick G. (1972). Playboy's election guide 1972 (1st ed.). Chicago: Playboy Press. p. 192. OCLC 3794650.
- Dutton, Frederick G. (1990). King Fahd of Saudi Arabia: the man, his work, and his country. Washington, D.C.: Hannaford Co. p. 27. OCLC 24608040.
- Dutton, Frederick G. (1981). "Frederick G. Dutton – Democratic campaigns and controversies, 1954–1966: an interview". Interviewed by Amelia R. Fry. Berkeley, CA: Regional Oral History Office, Bancroft Library. OCLC 58870450.
- Dutton, Frederick G. "Oral History Interview" (PDF). recorded interview by Charles T. Morrissey, May 3, 1965; copyright assigned to US Government November 14, 1973. John F. Kennedy Library Oral History Program. p. 67.

== See also ==
Government offices
Preceded by Brooks Hays	Assistant Secretary of State for Congressional Relations; 1961–1964	Succeeded by Douglas MacArthur II
