= Thomas E. Stephens (politician) =

American lawyer (1903–1988)

Tom Stephens

White House Appointments Secretary
- In office March 1958 – January 20, 1961
- President: Dwight Eisenhower
- Preceded by: Bob Gray
- Succeeded by: Kenneth O'Donnell
- In office January 20, 1953 – February 19, 1955; Acting: January 20, 1953 – April 14, 1953*
- President: Dwight Eisenhower
- Preceded by: Arthur H. Vandenberg Jr.
- Succeeded by: Bernard Shanley

White House Counsel
- In office January 20, 1953 – April 14, 1953*; On leave
- President: Dwight Eisenhower
- Preceded by: Charles S. Murphy
- Succeeded by: Bernard Shanley

Personal details
- Born: Thomas Edwin Stephens; October 18, 1903 Dún Laoghaire, Ireland
- Died: May 15, 1988 (aged 84) Clearwater, Florida, U.S.
- Party: Republican
- Education: St. Lawrence University (BA); Brooklyn Law School (LLB)
- *Vandenberg was on leave for the full duration of his term, and Stephens served as acting appointments secretary. Shanley acted as White House counsel in Stephens's stead.

Thomas Edwin Stephens (October 18, 1903 – May 15, 1988) served in the Eisenhower White House and worked on various Republican political campaigns.

Stephens was born in County Dublin, Ireland, and came with his family to the United States at the age of 13. He graduated from St. Lawrence University in 1932 and earned a law degree at Brooklyn Law School.

He began his political career in New York City. In 1934 he became an Assistant Corporation Counsel, representing the city's interests at the state legislature in Albany. In 1936 he entered private practice with the firm of Lord, Day and Lord. In 1938 he became administrative assistant to Newbold Morris, President of the City Council.

In World War II he served in Europe as a major in the Army Air Corps.

Following the war he became active in national Republican politics. In 1944 he worked as an assistant to Herbert Brownell, manager of Governor Dewey's campaign for the presidency. In 1945 and 1946 he served as director of the Republican National Committee's campaign division. He also served as administrative assistant to Senator John Foster Dulles in 1949. In 1950, he became the secretary to the New York Republican State Committee, serving until 1952.

He worked on Dewey's successful campaign for the Republican nomination in 1948 and his failed bid for the presidency that year. He 1952 he helped to organize the effort to draft General Eisenhower to run for office, then worked on Eisenhower's successful primary campaigns and was an aide to the General during the election campaign.

He left the New York law firm of Pheiffer, Stephens, and Weaver to join the White House staff as Appointments Secretary in January 1953. He had been recommended for the position by Sherman Adams. Despite his administrative title, he acted as a political adviser as well, was highly valued by the President and more influential than many realized.

He served until February 19, 1955, when he resigned to return to the "less ulcerous" duties of private law practice, joining the New York law firm of Shearman and Sterling and Wright. Press reports said he was "expected to remain a personal lieutenant of the President outside the White House. His soundings of opinion among politicians and the public may be highly persuasive if President Eisenhower considers running for a second term in 1956.

He worked on Eisenhower's 1956 re-election campaign and later returned to his position as Appointments Secretary in March 1958.

On January 25, 1961, just days after the end of Eisenhower's presidency, Stephens married Mary Caffrey, secretary to James Hagerty, who had been Eisenhower's press secretary. The couple lived in Phoenix. Stephens said he planned to enter business.

In 1962 he re-entered politics to work on Nelson Rockefeller's campaign for re-election as Governor of New York. In 1964, he served Rockefeller's presidential campaign as campaign director for the Eastern and Middle Atlantic states. He worked that same year on Senator Kenneth Keating's failed attempt to win re-election to the U.S. Senate. In 1968 he worked for Rockefeller's presidential campaign and on Senator Jacob Javits' successful re-election campaign as well.

He died in Clearwater, Florida, on May 15, 1988.

== Sources ==
- Michael S. Mayer, The Eisenhower Years (NY: Facts on File, 2010), 727-8
- Narvaez, Alfonzo A. (May 17, 1988). "T. E. Stephens, Eisenhower Aide And G.O.P. Strategist, Dies at 84". The New York Times.

Legal offices
Preceded by Charles S. Murphy	White House Counsel; On leave 1953	Succeeded by Bernard Shanley
Political offices
Preceded by Arthur H. Vandenberg Jr.	White House Appointments Secretary; 1953–1955	Succeeded by Bernard Shanley
Preceded by Bob Gray	White House Appointments Secretary; 1958–1961	Succeeded by Kenneth O'Donnell
