= Bernard M. Shanley =

American lawyer

Bernard Shanley

White House Appointments Secretary
- In office February 19, 1955 – November 6, 1957
- President: Dwight Eisenhower
- Preceded by: Tom Stephens
- Succeeded by: Bob Gray

White House Counsel
- In office January 20, 1953 – February 19, 1955; Acting: January 20, 1953 – April 14, 1953*
- President: Dwight Eisenhower
- Preceded by: Tom Stephens
- Succeeded by: Gerald Morgan

Personal details
- Born: Bernard Michael Shanley; August 4, 1903 Newark, New Jersey, U.S.
- Died: February 25, 1992 (aged 88) Bernardsville, New Jersey, U.S.
- Party: Republican
- Education: University of Notre Dame (attended); Columbia University (BA); Fordham University (LLB)
- *Stephens was appointed as White House Counsel, but was serving as acting appointments secretary for his full term, during which Shanley was acting counsel.

Bernard Michael Shanley (August 4, 1903 – February 25, 1992) was an American lawyer and politician best known for his work with U.S. President Dwight D. Eisenhower. He served under President Eisenhower as Deputy White House Chief of Staff, Appointments Secretary (1955–1957) and Special Counsel (1953–1955).

== Early life and education ==
Shanley was born in Newark, New Jersey on August 4, 1903 to a prominent family. His grandfather was a wealth contractor who built the Pennsylvania Railroad track to Philadelphia and helped found Public Service Electric and Gas. He attended St. Benedict's Preparatory School in Newark, graduating in 1921. He initially enrolled at the University of Notre Dame on an athletic scholarship but transferred to Columbia University when his father became ill. He graduated from Columbia in 1925; his father died the same year. While at Columbia, he was a roommate, fraternity brother, and baseball teammate of Lou Gehrig. He attended night classes at Fordham University School of Law and graduated in 1928, beginning his legal career in 1929.

== Career ==
In 1933, he formed a partnership named Young & Shanley in Newark, which was renamed Shanley & Fisher after Harold Fisher joined the firm. The firm was later relocated to Morristown, New Jersey. Over the following six decades, it grew to be one of the largest law firms in New Jersey with over 140 lawyers and over 400 employees. After his death, the firm merged with Drinker Biddle & Reath in November 1999. He served as counsel to the state Chamber of Commerce and served on the boards of Public Service Electric and Gas, St. Benedict's School, Cathay Insurance and the Chubb Corporation.

Shanley suspended his legal career from 1942 to 1945 to serve in World War II, attaining the rank of captain. He was a member of the New Jersey Bar and the United States Supreme Court Bar and a fellow of the American Bar Foundation, the American Bar Association, the Essex County and Somerset County Bar Associations, and the American Judicature Society. In 1965, he tried the case Palisades Properties, Inc. v. Brunetti, 44 N.J. 117 (1965), arguing the case of a philanthropist seeking to preserve the skyline of the New Jersey Palisades; the trial was lost but the firm won their appeal to the Supreme Court of New Jersey.

Shanley entered politics in the late 1940s as counsel to the New Jersey Republican State Committee. He also served as chair of the New Jersey Republican Finance Committee and Council of Legal Advisors. He was known as a moderate Republican.

=== 1948 and 1952 presidential campaigns ===
In 1947 and 1948, he served as New Jersey campaign manager for Harold Stassen's presidential campaign under future Supreme Court Chief Justice Warren E. Burger.

In 1951, Shanley became involved in efforts to draft Dwight D. Eisenhower to run for president as a Republican. While Eisenhower delayed his decision to run, Shanley again backed Stassen as a stalking horse candidate, serving as national manager of the Stassen campaign. Shanley unsuccessfully advised Stassen, who won only his home state of Minnesota, against efforts to campaign as a compromise between Eisenhower and Ohio Senator Robert A. Taft at the 1952 Republican National Convention, leading Stassen to marginalize him within the campaign. At the convention, Shanley, along with Burger, Edward Thye and Walter Judd, maneuvered to have the Minnesota delegation vote for Eisenhower against Stassen's wishes.

After Eisenhower won the nomination, Shanley joined his campaign and accompanied Eisenhower on most campaign stops. He was appointed to manage the scandal surrounding vice presidential nominee Richard Nixon, who was accused of receiving covert funding from supporters via a slush fund, but the project was abandoned after Nixon made his Checkers speech. Shanley also represented the campaign on New York City television, debating W. Averell Harriman and James Farley.

=== Advisor to President Eisenhower ===
After Eisenhower won the election, he offered Shanley the position of the Secretary of the Army, but Shanley declined. After Tom Stephens, who had been promised the role of White House Counsel, became Appointments Secretary instead, Shanley served as acting White House Counsel from January to April 1953. He was sworn in as White House Counsel on April 15, 1953 and served until February 19, 1955. As White House Counsel, Shanley managed relations with the independent agencies of the executive branch, which were often in conflict with the Eisenhower administration, having been staffed during the two preceding decades under Democratic administrations. In 1954, he fired Clarence Manion, chair of the Intergovernmental Relations Commission and a supporter of Robert A. Taft.

As Counsel, Shanley also worked with Taft, Secretary of Labor Martin Durkin and labor leader George Meany to amend the Taft–Hartley Act, a sweeping 1947 reform of federal labor regulations. When a draft of the bill was leaked to the press, Shanley was criticized by both labor and business interests. As a result of the leak, Shanley developed a lasting enmity against The Wall Street Journal. He believed the leak came from the office of Senator H. Alexander Smith of New Jersey, who he would later run to succeed. After Taft died in 1950, the efforts to amend the bill were abandoned. Secretary Durkin accused Shanley of sabotaging the reform for anti-labor purposes.

Shanley was promoted to Appointments Secretary in 1955, serving until 1957. He also served as deputy chief of staff under Sherman Adams. As a key Eisenhower aide, Shanley served as a liaison to Congress, the State Department and the military, recommended legislation, helped draft State of the Union addresses, and served on a National Security Council mission to Formosa regarding the islands of Quemoy and Matsu.

In 1957, Shanley declined efforts, led by Peter Frelinghuysen, to draft him to run for Governor of New Jersey against incumbent Robert Meyner.

=== Republican National Committee and campaigns for United States Senator ===
After leaving the White House, Shanley launched an unsuccessful bid for United States Senate in 1958, losing the Republican primary to U.S. Representative Robert Kean. In 1960, he was elected as the Republican National Committeeman from New Jersey. He resigned that office to run for Senate again in 1964, winning the Republican nomination but losing to incumbent Senator Pete Williams. He was again elected Republican National Committeeman in 1968 and served resigning until two weeks before his death in 1992. He served as vice chair of the Republican National Committee for the Northeast.

== Personal life and death ==
Shanley married Margaret V. Smith. They had three sons, Seton, Kevin, and Brendan, and two daughters, Maureen and Brigid. Shanley lived on a 69-acre estate, where he raised sheep.

He was awarded the Medal of St. Benedict in 1990 and named a Knight of St. Gregory by Pope John Paul II.

He died in Bernardsville, New Jersey on February 25, 1992 of natural causes following a brief illness.

Legal offices
Preceded by Tom Stephens	White House Counsel; 1953–1955	Succeeded by Gerald Morgan
Political offices
Preceded by Tom Stephens	White House Appointments Secretary; 1955–1957	Succeeded by Bob Gray
Party political offices
Preceded by Robert Kean	Republican nominee for U.S. Senator from New Jersey (Class 1); 1964	Succeeded by Nelson Gross
