= Charles S. Murphy =

American attorney and White House Counsel

Charles Murphy
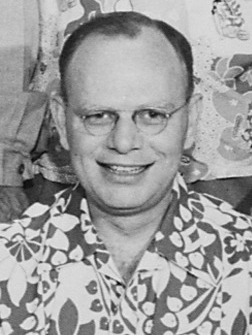

Chair of the Civil Aeronautics Board
- In office June 1, 1965 – March 11, 1968
- President: Lyndon B. Johnson
- Preceded by: Alan S. Boyd
- Succeeded by: John Crooker

Under Secretary of Agriculture
- In office March 21, 1961 – June 1, 1965
- President: John F. Kennedy; Lyndon B. Johnson
- Succeeded by: John Schnittker

White House Counsel
- In office January 31, 1950 – January 20, 1953
- President: Harry S. Truman
- Preceded by: Clark Clifford
- Succeeded by: Tom Stephens

Personal details
- Born: Charles Springs Murphy; August 20, 1909 Wallace, North Carolina, U.S.
- Died: August 28, 1983 (aged 74) Annapolis, Maryland, U.S.
- Party: Democratic
- Spouse: Katherine Chestney Graham (m. 1931; died 1983)
- Children: 3
- Education: Duke University (BA, LLB)

Charles Springs Murphy (August 20, 1909 – August 28, 1983) was an American attorney who served as the White House Counsel to U.S. President Harry S. Truman from 1950 to 1953. Prior to this, he was a staff member in the office of the legislative counsel of the U.S. Senate from 1934 to 1946 and Administrative Assistant to President Truman from 1947 to 1950. Subsequent to the Truman Administration, Murphy served as Under Secretary of Agriculture, from 1960 to 1965; and chairman of the Civil Aeronautics Board from 1965 to 1968.

== Biography ==
=== Early life ===
Murphy was born on a farm in Wallace, North Carolina. During the Great Depression Murphy worked his way through college at Duke University and its law school as a night mail clerk at the post office in Durham.

=== Career ===
After receiving his law degree in 1934 he went to Washington, and with the help of a former Duke Law School dean who had left the university to work in the Justice Department, he obtained a position helping to draft bills for the Senate leadership. In this role, he was called on to help draft a resolution establishing the Senate War Investigating Committee, which would later be chaired by a senator from Missouri, Harry S. Truman, beginning their friendship and long association.

In 1947 Murphy was named an administrative assistant to President Truman and later served as a speech writer and adviser during his 1948 election campaign. He was named special counsel to the president in 1950. He was one of the entourage at Truman's October 1950 meeting with General MacArthur on Wake Island during the Korean War. The following April when the president finally relieved MacArthur of command he advised Truman on public relations tactics. During the Truman years he was among the small group of advisers and friends called the "little cabinet" that the president sat with in late-evening meetings to develop policy and legislative strategy. When Truman left office in 1953, Murphy entered private law practice in Washington with the firm of Morison, Murphy, Clapp & Abrams.

In 1961 President John F. Kennedy appointed him Under Secretary of Agriculture where he handled the detail work on crop controls, price supports, farm subsidies and loans. In 1965 he was appointed chairman of the Civil Aeronautics Board by President Lyndon Johnson, a position he held until 1969 when, as a special counselor to Johnson, he supervised the transition to the Nixon Administration.

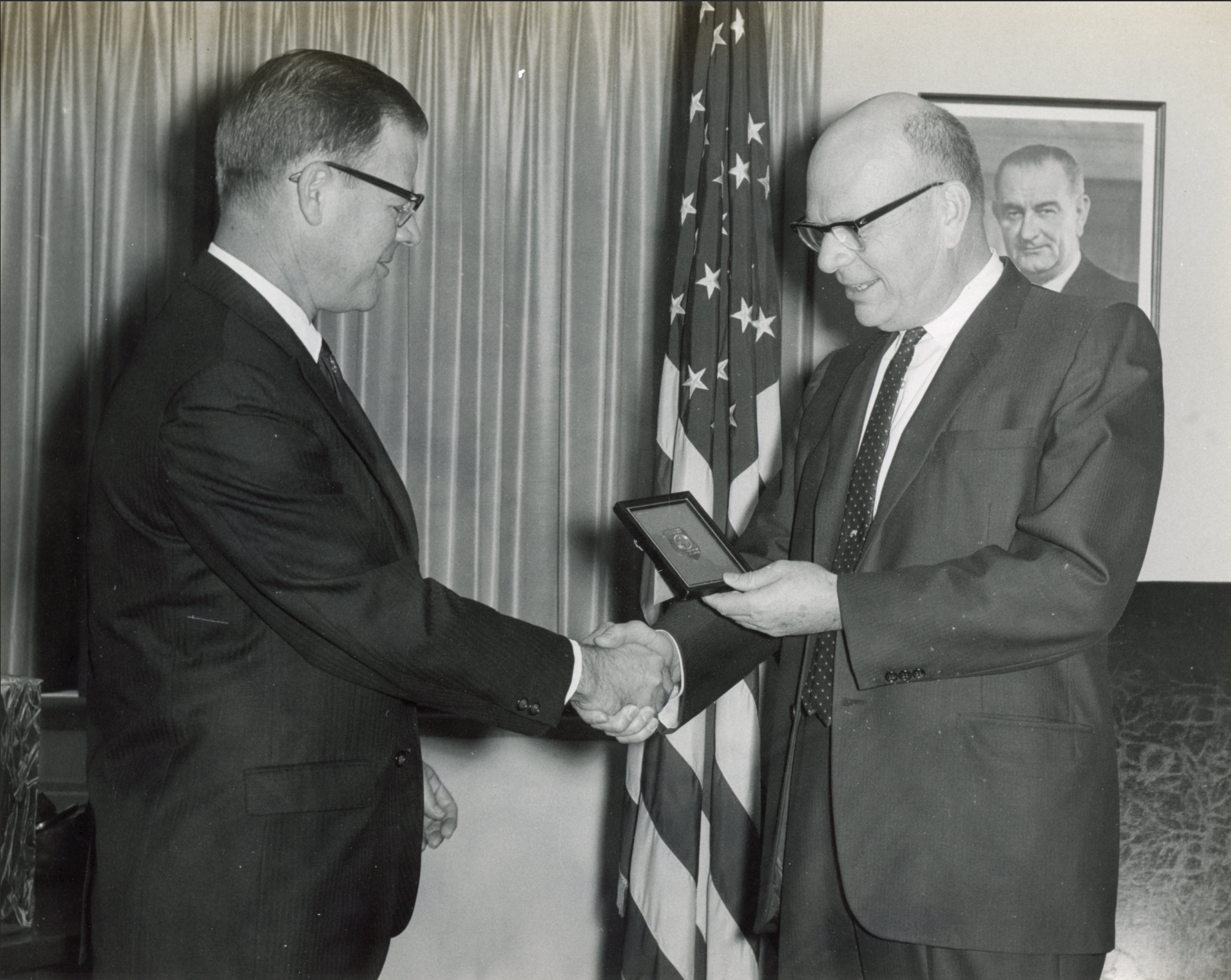
Charles S. Murphy (Right), Chairman of the CAB presenting accident investigator badge to Bobbie R. Allen, Director, Bureau of Safety, CAB abt. 1966

From 1969 to 1983 Murphy was a partner in the Washington law firm of Baker & Hostetler. He also served as general counsel to Frontier Airlines.

Murphy served on the Duke University board of trustees and on a number of committees at the university and was a trustee emeritus. Following the Watergate scandal and Nixon's subsequent resignation, Murphy resigned his various positions with Duke in protest against a plan initiated by University President Terry Sanford and former President Nixon, a 1937 alumnus of the Duke law school, to build the Richard M. Nixon presidential library at the university. In 1981 Duke University's faculty council decided by one vote to reject the proposed Nixon presidential library.

=== Personal life ===
Murphy married Katherine Chestney Graham of Hillsborough, North Carolina in 1931 and they had three children, including C. Westbrook Murphy. He died on August 28, 1983, in Annapolis, Maryland at age 74. He was survived by his son and two daughters. His wife Kate predeceased him by several months.

Legal offices
Preceded by Clark Clifford	White House Counsel; 1950–1953	Succeeded by Tom Stephens
