= Maxwell M. Rabb =

American diplomat (1910–2002)

Maxwell Rabb
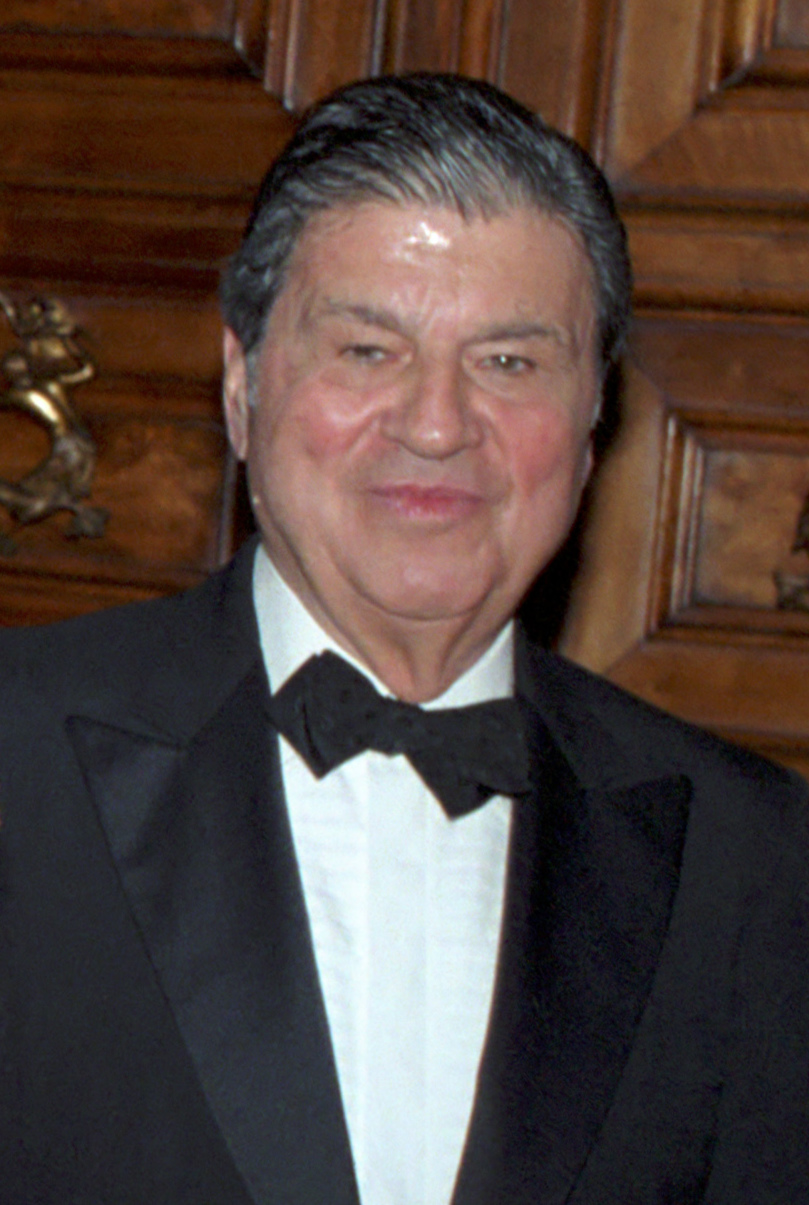
- Rabb in 1985

United States Ambassador to Italy
- In office July 1, 1981 – June 3, 1989
- President: Ronald Reagan
- Preceded by: Richard N. Gardner
- Succeeded by: Peter F. Secchia

White House Cabinet Secretary
- In office October 1953 – May 19, 1958
- President: Dwight D. Eisenhower
- Preceded by: Position established
- Succeeded by: Bob Gray

Personal details
- Born: September 28, 1910 Boston, Massachusetts, U.S.
- Died: June 9, 2002 (aged 91) New York City, U.S.
- Party: Republican
- Education: Harvard University (BA, LLB)

Maxwell Milton Rabb (September 28, 1910 – June 9, 2002) was an American lawyer who served in various positions as an advisor to U.S. President Dwight D. Eisenhower, and later as Ambassador to Italy under President Ronald Reagan.

Rabb was born in Boston, Massachusetts and earned an A.B. and an LLB from Harvard University in 1932 and 1935, respectively.

From 1937 to 1943, Rabb served as administrative assistant (secretary) to U.S. Senator Henry Cabot Lodge Jr. of Massachusetts. In 1944, when Lodge left the Senate, Rabb briefly worked as an administrative assistant for Lodge's successor as U.S. Senator, Sinclair Weeks.

From 1944 to 1946, Rabb joined the United States Navy Reserve and served as a lieutenant. In 1946 he would also serve as legal consultant to United States Secretary of the Navy James Forrestal.

Rabb got involved in the Eisenhower for President campaign in late 1951 and worked full-time for the campaign in 1952. In January 1953 he joined the White House staff as aide to Sherman Adams and counsel to the President, and in 1954 he became Secretary to the Cabinet (or Cabinet Secretary), a position he held until he resigned in 1958. Throughout all his time in the White House, Rabb was viewed as the staff member in charge of minority affairs. Correspondence, reports, and printed materials involving Jewish issues, African-Americans, civil rights, segregation, integration, anti-Semitism, refugees, and immigration were often referred to Rabb.

Following his resignation in 1958, Rabb became chairman of the U.S. delegation to the 1958 UNESCO Conference in Paris.

Rabb was a partner in the New York City law firm of Stroock & Stroock & Lavan before returning to public life and serving as the United States Ambassador to Italy from 1981 to 1989. During his tenure as Ambassador he was accused by the actor Nico Minardos of sanctioning, on behalf of the U.S. Government, an arms deal with Iran during a meeting between Rabb and Minardos at the U.S. Embassy in Rome. At the time, Minardos was involved in business dealings with the Saudi arms merchant Adnan Khashoggi. Rabb emphatically denied his involvement and ultimately he was not required to testify after the criminal indictment against Minardos and others was dismissed by U.S. Attorney Rudy Giuliani in the wake of the Iran-Contra scandal.

Political offices
New office	White House Cabinet Secretary; 1953–1958	Succeeded by Bob Gray
Diplomatic posts
Preceded by Richard N. Gardner	United States Ambassador to Italy; 1981–1989	Succeeded by Peter F. Secchia
