= Robert Keith Gray =

American Republican activist (1921–2014)

Bob Gray
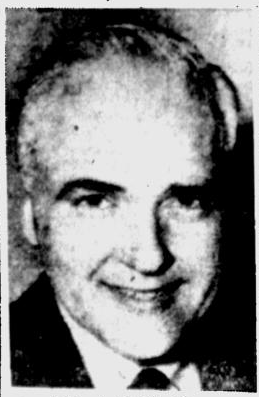

White House Cabinet Secretary
- In office May 19, 1958 – January 20, 1961
- President: Dwight D. Eisenhower
- Preceded by: Maxwell M. Rabb
- Succeeded by: Fred Dutton

White House Appointments Secretary
- In office November 6, 1957 – March 1958
- President: Dwight Eisenhower
- Preceded by: Bernard M. Shanley
- Succeeded by: Thomas Stephens

Personal details
- Born: Robert Keith Gray; September 2, 1921 Hastings, Nebraska, U.S.
- Died: April 18, 2014 (aged 92) Miami, Florida, U.S.
- Party: Republican
- Education: Carleton College (BA); Harvard University (MBA)

Robert Keith Gray (September 2, 1921 – April 18, 2014) was a Republican activist and public relations executive who founded Gray and Company in 1981 after working with Hill & Knowlton. He was President Dwight D. Eisenhower's White House Cabinet Secretary.

== Early life and education ==
Gray was born September 2, 1921, in Hastings, Nebraska, and graduated in 1943 from Carleton College in Northfield, Minnesota; he later graduated from Harvard University with a Masters in Business Administration. In between these, Gray served in the Navy during World War II and remained in the U.S. Naval Reserve, attaining the rank of commander.

== Career ==
=== In government service ===
In 1955 Mr. Gray joined the Navy Department as Special Assistant to Manpower. Called to the White House in 1956, he served first as Special Assistant to Sherman Adams, then acted as Appointments Secretary to President Eisenhower, and finally, in 1958, as Secretary of the Cabinet.

=== Private sector ===
He taught business administration at Nebraska's Hastings College.

In the 1960s and 1970s, he served as Washington operative for Hill & Knowlton. In those years, according to a case study by the Harvard Business School, H&K's clients produced nearly 10% of the GNP. Gray provided services to accounts that included the American Petroleum Institute, Procter and Gamble, and the National Association of Broadcasters and El Paso Natural Gas. El Paso hired Hill and Knowlton to drum up support for legislation that would allow El Paso to buy out its competitor, Pacific Northwest Pipeline Company.

In 1967, Gray joined the 50-person committee responsible for charting Richard Nixon's path to the White House. After Nixon was elected president, Gray would often escort Nixon's personal assistant, Rose Mary Woods to official functions.

After serving as deputy director of the Reagan-Bush presidential campaign, in 1980, Gray became Reagan's first appointment as president when Gray was named co-chairman of Ronald Reagan’s Presidential inauguration. During the Reagan Administration, Gray started his own firm, Gray and Company, in 1981. When he took the firm public in 1985, it became the first public relations-public affairs firm to be listed on the New York Stock Exchange. Three years later, he sold majority interest in the firm to Hill & Knowlton and became H&K's Worldwide Chairman. In 1988, as one of his last acts as president, Reagan flew to Gray's hometown, Hastings, Nebraska, to dedicate a communications center Gray had given to Hastings College in honor of his parents.

Notable clients of Gray and Company included Adnan Khashoggi, Saudi Arabian billionaire and arms dealer, the government of Haiti under the Duvalier dynasty, American commodities trader and financier Marc Rich (who in 1983 was indicted for trading with Iran during the hostage crisis and a variety of other charges, fled the country, and was later granted a pardon by President Bill Clinton), the Teamsters Union, and Korean religious leader Sun Myung Moon.

Gray's first book, Eighteen Acres Under Glass: Life in Washington As Seen By the Former Secretary of the Cabinet, was published in 1962 by Doubleday in the States and by MacMillan overseas. Eventually becoming number four on The Times best-seller list, the book highlighted the demands on both his political and social life as the Secretary of the Cabinet under President Dwight D. Eisenhower. With tales from the visits with kings and queens to the extended hours spent with the Chief Executive, the book gives an inner look at the functions and sometimes dysfunctions of Washington. Gray was featured in cover stories in Time magazine and U.S. News & World Report, and was the subject of a fifteen-minute Monitor program on NBC.

The 1992 book, The Power House: Robert Keith Gray and the Selling of Access and Influence in Washington by Susan B. Trento, "tells how Mr. Gray, after unabashedly peddling access for decades, reached the apex of his influence when his friend Ronald Reagan moved into the White House."

In 2012 Gray's book Presidential Perks Gone Royal: Your Tax Dollars Are Being Used For Obama's Re-Election was published by New Voices Press.

== Personal life and death ==
Gray was never openly gay, but his obituary acknowledged his partner of 20 years, Efrain Machado. Gray died in Miami, Florida, on April 18, 2014.

== Awards and recognition ==
Gray received Italy's highest civilian decoration, Grande Ufficiale.

Political offices
Preceded by Bernard M. Shanley	White House Appointments Secretary; 1957–1958	Succeeded by Thomas Stephens
Preceded by Maxwell Rabb	White House Cabinet Secretary; 1958–1961	Succeeded by Fred Dutton
