= David W. Kendall =

American attorney

David Kendall

White House Counsel
- In office November 5, 1958 – January 20, 1961
- President: Dwight D. Eisenhower
- Preceded by: Gerald D. Morgan
- Succeeded by: Ted Sorensen

Personal details
- Born: David Walbridge Kendall Sr. February 11, 1903 Indianapolis, Indiana, U.S.
- Died: December 27, 1976 (aged 73) Grosse Pointe, Michigan, U.S.
- Party: Republican
- Education: Princeton University (BA); University of Michigan (LLB)

David Walbridge Kendall Sr. (February 2, 1916 – December 27, 1976) was an American attorney who served as the White House Counsel to President Dwight D. Eisenhower from 1958 to 1961. David served in the Second World War, as the 82nd Airborne Division as a Lieutenant Colonel, retiring from the Army in 1948. After his retirement, the President of the United States would nominate him as the White House Councel in 1958.

Legal offices
Preceded by Gerald D. Morgan	White House Counsel; 1958–1961	Succeeded by Ted Sorensen
