= Arthur H. Vandenberg Jr. =

American presidential advisor (1907–1968)

Arthur Vandenberg Jr.
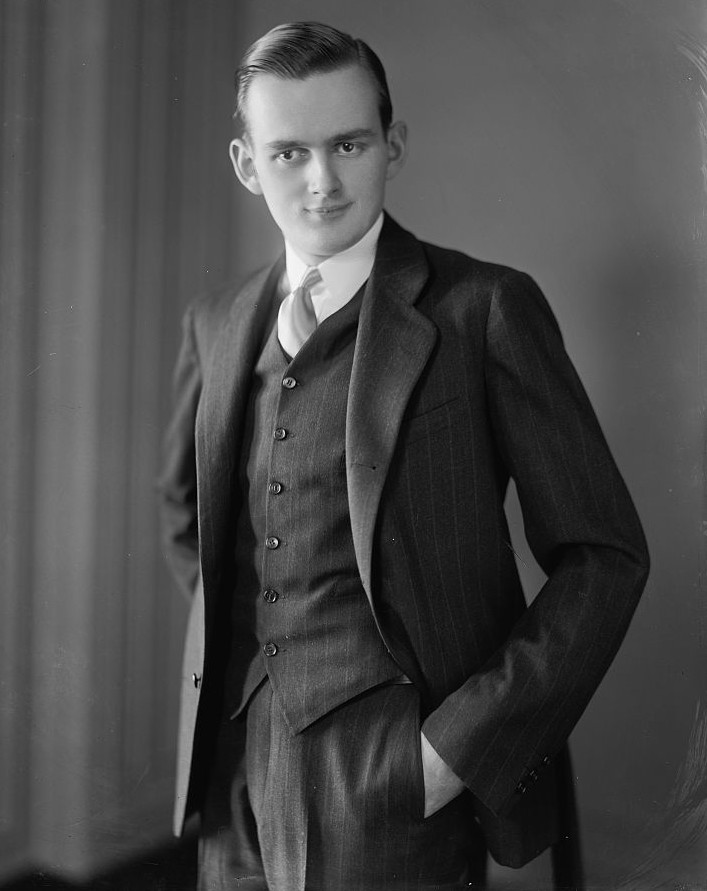

White House Appointments Secretary
- On leave
- In office January 20, 1953 – April 14, 1953*
- President: Dwight Eisenhower
- Preceded by: Matthew J. Connelly
- Succeeded by: Tom Stephens

Personal details
- Born: Arthur Hendrick Vandenberg Jr. June 30, 1907 Grand Rapids, Michigan, U.S.
- Died: January 18, 1968 (aged 60) Miami, Florida, U.S.
- Party: Republican
- Relatives: Arthur Vandenberg (father)
- Education: Dartmouth College (BA)
- *Vandenberg was on leave for the full duration of his term, and Stephens served as acting appointments secretary.

Arthur Hendrick Vandenberg Jr. (June 30, 1907 – January 18, 1968) was a Republican government official from Michigan. He worked for many years on the staff of his father, Arthur H. Vandenberg (1884–1951), who served in the U.S. Senate from 1928 to 1951. He was briefly announced as White House Appointments Secretary by then President-elect Eisenhower in November 1952 but announced he would be on "sick leave" on January 13, 1953, just before the start of the Eisenhower administration before completely resigning in April 1953. He also worked as a consultant and academic and edited his father's papers for publication.

The reason for his 1953 resignation, originally blamed on health problems, was later revealed to be his inability to pass a security test because of his homosexuality. In October 1964, following the arrest of President Lyndon Johnson's longtime aide Walter Jenkins on a "morals charge", columnist Drew Pearson published the circumstances of Vandenberg's 1953 resignation, and President Johnson himself repeated them publicly later that same month.

== Early years ==
Vandenberg was born on June 30, 1907, in Grand Rapids, Michigan. His mother, the former Elizabeth Watson, died in 1917. He graduated from Dartmouth in 1928, just after his father entered the U.S. Senate.

After graduation, he joined his parents in Washington, D.C., and attended social events escorting Margo Couzens, the daughter of Michigan's other U.S. Senator, James J. Couzens. He served in the Army Air Forces during World War II, joining as a private and rising to major. He was awarded the Legion of Merit "for his work in intelligence and public relations during the war."

== Government service ==
For 14 years before and after World War II he worked for his father in various capacities, described as his secretary, administrative assistant, or executive assistant. Sometimes he handled political matters and played the role of his father's spokesperson. Occasionally he substituted for his father at important meetings, as when he attended a meeting of Michigan Governor Kim Sigler with FBI officials to discuss "Communist activity in Michigan." He managed his father's campaigns for re-election.

Following his father's death in April 1951, he worked as a staff member for Nelson Rockefeller's International Basic Economy Corporation (IBEC), an overseas private investment firm that promoted economic development in Latin America, spending some of his time with IBEC in Brazil.

He edited The Private Papers of Senator Vandenberg, which appeared in the spring of 1952. The New York Times noted Vandenberg, Jr.'s work as "a series of competent explanatory notations" while International Affairs called it "illuminating documentation" and "an impressive memorial." Scholars occasionally cite Vandenberg Jr.'s contributions to the volume.

In the spring of 1952, there was speculation he would run for his father's U.S. Senate seat against Senator Blair Moody, a Democrat who had been appointed to complete the term of Senator Vandenberg. Vandenberg said he would run if it meant a strong campaign in Michigan to win the Republican nomination for Eisenhower. Moody welcomed the prospect of a Vandenberg candidacy, saying it would mean a clean race and that he approved anything that would help Eisenhower win the Republican presidential nomination over the isolationist Taft. After just a few days' consideration, Vandenberg declined to run, saying the Republican candidate needed to be an experienced campaigner and that he was uncertain his running would "greatly strengthen the Eisenhower movement in Michigan."

Vandenberg was an early supporter of Eisenhower for President and helped organize a national executive committee on his behalf in January 1952 when he was not yet a candidate. He met with Eisenhower in Paris several times in the spring of 1952, helping to organize his return from Paris to campaign for the Republican nomination. He served on the staff of the national committee and for a time in New York as Chairman of Citizens for Eisenhower, an organization of non-politicians outside the Republican Party's structure that had promoted Eisenhower's candidacy. For a time he was posted to Washington, D.C., as assistant to national campaign manager Henry Cabot Lodge Jr.

Once Eisenhower secured the Republican nomination, Vandenberg served as his Executive Assistant and coordinated the General's personal staff.

In October 1952, Vandenberg privately expressed disappointment in a letter to Sherman Adams that Eisenhower, on a campaign tour of Wisconsin, did not distinguish himself as strongly as Vandenberg would have liked from Senator Joseph McCarthy's anti-Red activities and especially from his recent attack on General George Marshall.

== White House staff ==
Following Eisenhower's victory in the presidential race, at the end of November 1952, the President-elect designated Vandenberg to be his Appointments Secretary, He immediately began preparing for those duties, then in January took a vacation in Florida "because of ill health." "Close associates of General Eisenhower," reported the New York Times, "said there was no basis for speculation that Mr. Vandenberg's absence meant that he might not take office with the new Administration. They said he was 'a little bit under the weather'."

On January 13, 1953, however, a week before Eisenhower's inauguration, the White House announced that Vandenberg was taking a leave of absence for health reasons. The New York Times now reported Vandenberg "was granted an extended leave of absence because of ill health. He suffers from an undisclosed 'blood condition' and said it would be some months before he could hope to assume his White House duties." On April 14, 1953, he resigned his position blaming "an attack of stomach ulcers." He told the press that he was uncertain of his prognosis and "the uncertainty was unfair to the President." He said that rumors of trouble between himself and the President were "definitely not true." Instead he planned to work for IBEC again.

== Later career ==
I am delighted that you are continuing to take a friendly interest in an individual who, regardless of anything in the past, is obviously a sensitive character, devoted to his country and well informed in the international field.

— President Eisenhower to Nelson Rockefeller
February 23, 1957

Vandenberg next served as a visiting lecturer in international affairs in the Government Department at the University of Miami, holding as well the title of Director at the Governmental Affairs Foundation of New York.

Eisenhower invited him back to the White House in June 1954 to attend a "stag dinner" for the President and 16 guests. The New York Times listed the names of those invited–almost all men in private industry—but only wrote about Vandenberg. An academic journal announced his plan to travel abroad in the summer of 1954 and in December of that year, he met with the President to report on his three-month trip, which the President described as covering the Middle East and Far East. Eisenhower asked him to "follow up with a written memorandum."

Vandenberg resigned from his academic position following the publication of an exposé in Confidential magazine in 1956, which he called a "smear."

Nelson Rockefeller advised Vandenberg to return to university teaching and perhaps publish some of his lectures. President Eisenhower later wrote discreetly to Rockefeller concerning "a mutual friend of ours" and said he was aware of the contents of an article, presumably the Confidential exposé, though he had not read it. He wrote: "I am delighted that you are continuing to take a friendly interest in an individual who, regardless of anything in the past, is obviously a sensitive character, devoted to his country and well informed in the international field." He seconded Rockefeller's advice about teaching and publishing and added: "For my part, I am truly grateful to you for being helpful in this situation, as you are in so many others."

Vandenberg worked for the rest of his life as a public relations consultant.

== 1964 revelation ==
On October 7, 1964, President Lyndon Johnson's Special Assistant and Chief of Staff Walter Jenkins was arrested on a morals charge in Washington, D.C. He resigned on October 14.

James Reston, writing in the New York Times the following day, wrote that "President Eisenhower was embarrassed by a comparable morals charge against one of his first appointees of his first Administration," but gave no specifics. Drew Pearson in his October 19 "Washington Merry-go-round" column recounted the 1952 events and confirmed Vandenberg's homosexuality. He described Vandenberg as one who showed great promise—"bright, intelligent, a great asset to the President"—but was "unable to pass a security test" at the last minute.

Campaigning in San Diego on October 28, 1964, just days before the 1964 presidential election, President Lyndon Johnson was questioned about morality in his administration. Johnson replied that every administration had its scandals and cited the case of Eisenhower's appointments secretary, thus confirming Pearson's outing Arthur H. Vandenberg Jr. Later that evening, Johnson described his San Diego response to Attorney General Nicholas Katzenbach:

I said that every administration has these problems ... Now the press plays it up pretty big, as if I indicted Eisenhower as having a pervert as his appointments secretary ... I did not intend to do that ... My thought was that every President I'd known [had such problems]. From Hoover when he had Andrew Mellon ... to Roosevelt with Sumner Welles, to Truman with Matt Connelly and with Harry Dexter White, Eisenhower with Vandenberg ...

The President now feared some of the press thought

that I am guilty of McCarthy-like character assassination ... because I did specify that Ike had this problem with his appointments secretary. So, my problem is ... to immediately identify the appointments secretary in my own mind—not for public use, but to be sure in my own mind that I'm on safe ground ... we better get the facts on ... Arthur Vandenberg, Jr.

Within the past month Johnson had read in an FBI file that Vandenberg "had some sex problems," but he still feared that his public comments might expose him to a lawsuit for slander. Months later, Johnson read in Joe Alsop's FBI file that Vandenberg was one of Alsop's lovers.

Years later, Johnson's press secretary George Reedy used Johnson's remarks about Vandenberg as an example of how Johnson, despite great face-to-face political skills, could be "incredibly clumsy when talking to a group of journalists." He continued:

He could convert a normal, even praiseworthy, thought into a shocking declaration which he did not intend to make. In the aftermath of the Walter Jenkins case, for example, he appeared to be counterattacking the Republican Party for having had some homosexuals in its midst when he was only trying to say that homosexuality was not, and should not be, a partisan issue.

Vandenberg died in Miami, Florida, on January 18, 1968.

== Notes ==
Political offices
Preceded by Matthew J. Connelly	White House Appointments Secretary; On leave 1953	Succeeded by Tom Stephens
