= Gerald D. Morgan =

American lawyer

Gerald Morgan

White House Counsel
- In office February 19, 1955 – November 5, 1958
- President: Dwight D. Eisenhower
- Preceded by: Bernard Shanley
- Succeeded by: David Kendall

Personal details
- Born: December 19, 1908 New York City, New York, U.S.
- Died: June 16, 1976 (aged 67) Mustique, Saint Vincent and the Grenadines
- Party: Republican
- Education: Princeton University (BA); Harvard University (LLB)

Gerald D. Morgan (December 19, 1908 – June 15, 1976) was born in New York, attended Buckley School, and graduated from Princeton University in 1930, and Harvard Law School in 1933. He was a member of the bar in New York, Kentucky, and the District of Columbia. After his graduation he served in the Solicitor's Office of the United States Steel Corporation for a brief term. Morgan became assistant legislative counsel for the House of Representatives. In 1938, he began practicing law in Louisville, Kentucky, but he returned to his former job in the House in 1939. Between 1945 and 1950, Morgan was a partner in the Washington law firm of Morgan and Calhoun. He worked on special assignments for several Congressional committees, including the House Committee On Un-American Activities.

He was special counsel to the majority of the House in connection with labor legislation in 1947 and served as legislative counsel to the House Committee on Education and Labor, a standing committee subsequently known as the United States House Committee on Education and the Workforce.

Mr, Morgan was a special consultant to the First Hoover Commission on Government Reorganization in 1947 and 1948. In 1949 he wrote "Congressional Investigations and Judicial Review: Kilbourn v. Thompson."

Morgan was a member of the Eisenhower administration. On January 21, 1953, he was appointed Special Assistant on the White House staff. From 1952 to 1955, he served as administrative assistant to President Dwight D. Eisenhower. From 1955 to 1958, he served as special counsel to the president and from 1958 to 1961 he served as Eisenhower's deputy assistant. He helped draft the Taft-Hartley Act.

When President Eisenhower left office in 1961, Gerald Demuth Morgan returned to private practice. In 1967 he was an elected delegate to the Maryland Constitutional Convention held in Annapolis. In 1971, he became president for public and government affairs of the National Railroad Passenger Corporation (Amtrak). He again returned to private practice in 1973.

When he died in 1976, he was a member of the Washington law firm Hamel, Park, McCabe and Saunders.

Legal offices
Preceded by Bernard Shanley	White House Counsel; 1955–1958	Succeeded by David Kendall
