= T. Lamar Caudle =

American lawyer and assistant attorney general

United States Assistant Attorney General for the Criminal Division
- In office July 27, 1945 – 1947
- President: Harry S. Truman
- Preceded by: Tom C. Clark
- Succeeded by: T. Vincent Quinn

Personal details
- Born: Theron Lamar Caudle; July 22, 1904 Wadesboro, North Carolina, U.S.
- Died: April 1, 1969 (aged 64) Wadesboro, North Carolina, U.S.
- Party: Democratic
- Spouses: Fairfid Monsalvatge (m. 1928) Ellen Hildreth Koogler (m. 1963)
- Children: 4
- Education: Wake Forest College (LLB)

Theron Lamar Caudle Jr. (July 22, 1904 – April 1, 1969) was an American lawyer and assistant attorney general.

== Early life and education ==
Caudle was born in Wadesboro, North Carolina on July 22, 1904, to Theron Lamar Caudle (1874–1929), a lawyer who was president of the North Carolina Bar Association, and Susie Gooch Caudle (died 1948). He had a brother, Charles B. Caudle, an attorney who was assigned to the International Military Tribunal for the Far East, and two sisters.

Caudle attended Wake Forest College, becoming president of the student body and receiving a Bachelor of Laws degree in 1926. Following his graduation, he was admitted to the North Carolina bar and began practicing law with his father's firm in Wadesboro. He married his first wife, Fairfid Monsalvatge, in 1928. They had four children together, all of whom survived him. From 1931 until 1939, Caudle served as a prosecuting attorney for Anson County.

== Career ==
During January 1940, Caudle was nominated by Senator Robert R. Reynolds to serve as the district attorney for the Western District of North Carolina, a position that was held by W. Roy Francis after his predecessor Marcus Erwin had died. Later that year, President Franklin D. Roosevelt appointed him as the U.S. attorney for the district, a position which Caudle held until 1945.

On July 16, 1945, President Harry S. Truman nominated Caudle to be the assistant attorney general for the Department of Justice's Criminal Division, succeeding Tom C. Clark. He was approved by the Senate Judiciary Committee ten days later, confirmed unanimously by the Senate the next day, and arrived in Washington, D.C. with his family during September that year. During his term, he directed all of the Department of Justice's criminal prosecution in the federal court system, with the agency taking a strong interest in civil rights cases during this time. Following the lynching of John Cecil Jones in 1946, Lamar was responsible for opening a case against the six suspects following local law enforcement refusing to investigate, although the case resulted in acquittals for all of the suspects following the defendants arguing that the prosecution was "politically motivated" against the South.

However, Caudle was criticized for his involvement in a Missouri voter fraud scandal involving the 1946 Kansas City Democratic congressional primary, where Enos A. Axtell, an obscure candidate who was backed by President Truman, won the primary over his better-known opponents. Although the House Campaign Expenditures Committee began an investigation following calls by Missouri's Republican senator, the agency declined to prosecute anyone. Despite that, in 1947, Caudle was named assistant attorney general for the Tax Division, a position which he served until 1951. During Truman's presidential campaign in 1948, Caudle was among the few prominent men in North Carolina that openly supported him, with The Lexington Dispatch crediting him for the president's success in the state.

== Legal issues ==
During early 1951, a subcommittee of the House Ways and Means Committee, headed by Cecil R. King, began investigating Caudle for his administration of internal revenue laws. They discovered that Caudle was involved in several "questionable and illegal activities", which included allowing two wine merchants to underwrite his expenses during a trip to Italy in exchange for several favors, purchasing for $1,500 a mink coat that cost $4,000 due to a New York tax attorney intervening, and dropping many tax cases which the Internal Revenue Service asked him to prosecute. In November 1951, President Truman asked for his resignation amid these inquiries. In response, during 1952, Caudle paid the government $1,000 to settle his unpaid taxes.

During 1955, Caudle and civil servant Matthew J. Connelly were indicted due to their involvement on a 1951 tax fraud prosecution that the former had overseen. Caudle had been asked by Connolly to indefinitely postpone a prosecution of Irving Sachs, who had been indicted in 1947 for evading over $128,000 in federal income taxes. Sachs's attorney, Harry Schwimmer, had contacted Connolly asking that the Administration postpone his trial due to poor health. Although Caudle denied Connolly's request, he ultimately recommended that his prosecutors accept a guilty plea, causing Sachs to receive a sentence of probation and a fine of $40,000, instead of the several years' imprisonment he had faced. Following the case, Schwimmer gifted Connolly suits and other items worth several hundred dollars, and purchases thousands of dollars worth of oil royalties worth several thousand dollars for both Connolly and Caudle. Although Connolly accepted the royalty, Caudle rejected the gift.

After a 37-day trial, a jury convicted Caudle and Connolly to two years in prison. Despite appealing his case several times, including three unsuccessful petitions to the Supreme Court of the United States, in May 1960, Caudle was imprisoned in the Federal Correctional Institution of Tallahassee, Florida. He served six months of time there before being paroled after he received a "meritorious service" award, being formally released in 1961. Following his release, Caudle returned to home to Wadesboro; a subsequent House committee investigation determined that he "was weak and the naive code of a country lawyer did not serve him well in the corrupting sophistication of the Washington he knew; he made errors of judgment; and he swallowed more in the name of personal loyalty than any man should stomach. But [he] never sold himself for riches or for power."

== Later life and death ==
In 1964, Caudle attempted to file as a Democratic candidate for North Carolina's 8th congressional district but withdrew after his doctors advised him not to do so as it would "imperil" his health. W. D. James, who was later the Democratic nominee, lost to incumbent Republican Charles R. Jonas in that year's election. He tried again in March 1966, this time filing the Democratic candidate after driving 120 miles to the North Carolina State Board of Elections in Raleigh nine minutes before closing time, as the board mandated him to appear. He lost in the primary to John G. Plumides, a lawyer in Charlotte, by nine thousand votes.

In 1963, Caudle married his second wife, Ellen Hildreth Koogler. They had no children and she survived him. Caudle himself died at his home in Wadesboro, at April 1, 1969 from a heart attack, at the age of 64. He is buried at the town's East View Cemetery.
