= Matthew J. Connelly =

American civil servant (1907–1976)

Matthew Connelly
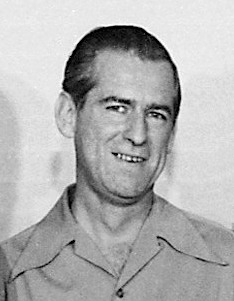

White House Appointments Secretary
- In office April 12, 1945 – January 20, 1953
- President: Harry S. Truman
- Preceded by: Pa Watson
- Succeeded by: Arthur H. Vandenberg Jr.

Personal details
- Born: November 19, 1907 Clinton, Massachusetts, U.S.
- Died: July 10, 1976 (aged 68) Oak Park, Illinois, U.S.
- Party: Democratic
- Education: Fordham University (BA)

Matthew J. Connelly (November 19, 1907 – July 10, 1976) was an American civil servant. He served as executive secretary to Vice President Harry S. Truman and later appointments secretary in the Truman Administration. In 1955, he was indicted for bribery, whereupon he was convicted the following year. He served six months in prison in 1960 and was granted a full pardon by President John F. Kennedy in 1962.

== Career ==
In 1930, he graduated from Fordham University and began his career as a stockbroker in New York City.

=== Civil service ===
In 1933, Connelly began civil service with federal relief agencies based in Boston and then Washington, DC. In 1935, moved to Washington. In 1938, his first job on the Hill in DC was "investigation of the relief program"—that is, "the local welfare program."

In 1939, he joined the staff of the House Appropriations Committee, chaired by U.S. Representative Clarence Cannon and investigated the Works Progress Administration.

In 1940, he joined the staff of the Senate Special Committee to Investigate Campaign Expenditures, chaired by U.S. Representative Guy Gillette. There, he worked under subcommittee chair U.S. Senator J. Lister Hill "to investigate the Kelly-Nash machine" in Chicago and then the Wendell Willkie campaign in Alabama. Senator Lister had Connelly join the Truman Committee.

In 1941, he served as chief investigator of the Senate Special Committee to Investigate the National Defense Program, known as the "Truman Committee." Investigators who reported to him included: Hugh Fulton, William S. Cole, Rudolph Halley, Walter Hehmeyer, Robert L. Irvin, Donald M. Lathrom, and Frank E. Lowe.

In July 1944, he became executive assistant to Senator Truman.

In January 1945, he served as executive secretary to newly elected Vice President Truman.

In April 1945 through 1953, he served as appointments secretary to President Truman.

=== Bribery charges ===
In 1955, the U.S. Department of Justice indicted Connelly and T. Lamar Caudle for accepting a bribe and conspiring to defraud the government. In 1956, he received a conviction. In 1960, he served six months in prison.

In 1962, President John F. Kennedy granted Connelly "a full and unconditional pardon."

== Personal life ==
Connelly married Doris and had one son.

In a 1967 interview with Truman Library oral historian Jerry N. Hess, Stephen J. Spingarn, Federal Trade Commission Commissioner (1950–1953), suspected that Max Lowenthal and Connelly "stuck the knife in me." Philleo Nash told Spingarn it was Connelly, influenced by Lowenthal:

I mentioned that Max Lowenthal had once told Niles, and possibly others that I was a Fa[s]cist, that was in 1949, because I told Lowenthal I favored wiretapping under proper controls ... Nash said it was quite possible that Max Lowenthal was very vindictive, and he mentioned that Max Lowenthal is currently spending much time in Matt's office with L's son.

Spingarn further recalled:

There was an operation run, more or less, under the supervision of Max Lowenthal in the basement of the White House which was to prepare answers to the charges that McCarthy was hurling so freely during all that period and get them ready in a hurry, not wait until the lie had gone around the world before the truth has gotten its pants on. I remember Herb Maletz—good man—worked in that thing and one or two others whose names I can't remember at the moment.
Max Lowenthal was very much involved in that, and in his book The Truman Presidency, Cabell Phillips has me teamed up with Max Lowenthal in running that operation, which is not correct. I did an awful lot of work on the McCarthy stuff, but I did it in terms of trying to devise some machinery, or system, or operation.

He lived in Cicero, Illinois. Connelly died age 68 on July 10, 1976, in Oak Park, Illinois, at Rust Suburban Hospital from cancer.

== External sources ==
- Truman Library: Matthew J. Connelly Appointment Diaries, 1945–1952 (and undated)

Political offices
Preceded by Pa Watson	White House Appointments Secretary; 1945–1953	Succeeded by Arthur H. Vandenberg Jr.
