= Eddy (surname) =

The surname Eddy is used by descendants of a number of English, Irish and Scottish families.

== Etymology ==
Frank R. Holmes, in his Directory of the Ancestral Heads of New England Families, 1600-1700, proposes two possible origins; the Gaelic eddee, "instructor", or from the Saxon ed and ea, "backwards" and "water", a whirlpool or eddy, making the surname Eddy a place-name. Another possible origin is the Saxon root ead, "success" or "prosperity". Ead occurs in numerous commonly used names, as Edgar, Edmund, Edward, Edwin, and the outdated Edwy. John Eddy of Taunton spells the name Eddway in the earliest record so far found. Eddy could also be a diminutive of any one of these names.

Robert Ferguson, in his work on English Surnames, believes that Eddy is a place-name: “Eday, Eady, Eddy are from ead, prosperity. Hence the name of the rock Eddiston, on which the celebrated light house is built. From this word are compounded a great number of Anglo-Saxon names of which we have Edward, Edmund, Edgar, Edw Edwin.”

== Early history ==
One of the first mentions that is close to the form of Eddy, is the name of the priest Eddi or Edde, Latinized into Eddius. He went to Northumbria from Canterbury with Bishop Wilfrid (or Wilfrith) in 669, and later took the name Stephanus. He taught the Roman method of chanting, and in 709 he was in the monastery of Ripon, where he wrote a life of Wilfrid in Latin.

In the Domesday Book, the name Eddeu is used in a description of Little Abington, Cambridgeshire, and during the time of Edward the First there were a number of people named Ede, Edde, and Edwy on the tax collection rolls of Worcestershire. There is a record in Hertfordshire, of a William Edy, Gentleman, in 1486. Edie, Eddy, Eddye, Edshune and Edye are found in numerous records in Gloucestershire from 1545 onward. At Woodbridge, Suffolk, Eyde is found as a surname between 1599 and 1610.

Starting from 1570 in the records of many parishes of the Archdeaconry Court of Cornwall, the following surnames are found: Edy, Eady, Eedy, Ede, Edye, Eddey, and Eddy. In Bristol, the town where William Eddye, the Vicar, was born, a number of wills from the late 16th century have the surname of Eddie, Eddye or Eddy. Ade, Adie, Addy, Eadie are common Scottish surnames. These may be forms of the name “Adam”. David Eadie of Moneaght, Scotland, was granted a coat of arms in 1672.

== The surname in North America ==
In North America, the largest family group who bears the Eddy surname are descended from two brothers, John and Samuel, who immigrated to America on October 29, 1630, on a ship called Handmaid. Their father, William Eddye, was the Vicar of the church in Cranbrook, England, from 1586 to 1616 and was born in Bristol in the mid-16th century. Other Northern American "patriarchs" are John Eddy who lived in Taunton, Massachusetts in the late 17th century; John Eddy of Woodbridge, New Jersey, (Scottish) who immigrated in the early 18th century; James Eddy, born in Dublin, Ireland, around 1712, and immigrated in 1753; Thomas Eddy, immigrated in the late 18th century to Fort Ann, New York, from Ireland; brothers William and John Eddy, immigrated from Ireland to New York city in the mid 19th century; and William Dave Eddy, who came to the United States from Cornwall, England, in 1887. There is a currently large family of Eddys in Cornwall.

== Notable persons ==
- Alan Eddy (1926–2017), English biochemist
- Allison Eddy, Canadian nephrologist
- Amy Eddy (born 1975), American judge
- Arthur Jerome Eddy (1859–1920), American lawyer, author, art collector, and art critic
- Barry Eddy (born 1952), Australian rules footballer
- Bill Eddy (fl. 1970s–2010s), American statistician
- Brett Eddy (born 1989), Australian rules footballer
- C. M. Eddy Jr. (1896–1967), American short story writer
- Cecil Ernest Eddy (1900–1956), Australian radiologist and physicist
- Charles B. Eddy (active on 1880s), American cattle rancher, namesake for Eddy County, New Mexico
- Chris Eddy (born 1969), American Major League Baseball pitcher
- Chuck Eddy (born 1960), American music journalist
- Clarence Eddy (1851–1937), American organist and composer
- Cullen Eddy (born 1988), American professional ice hockey defenseman
- Daniel C. Eddy (1823–1896), American clergyman, hymn writer, politician, and author
- David M. Eddy (active since 1971), American physician, mathematician, and healthcare analyst
- Deborah Eddy (fl. 1990s–2010s), member of the Washington House of Representatives
- Dolph Eddy (1918–1989), Australian politician
- Don Eddy (1935–2017), American basketball coach
- Don Eddy (1946–2018), Major League Baseball pitcher
- Duane Eddy (1938–2024), American guitarist
- E. M. G. Eddy (1851–1897), Commissioner of Railways in New South Wales
- Eddy Brothers, two American mediums best known in the 1870s, who claimed psychic powers
- Edward D. Eddy (1921–1998), American educator and college administrator
- Elizabeth Eddy (born 1991), American soccer midfielder
- Ezra Butler Eddy (1827–1906), Canadian businessman and political figure
- FannyAnn Eddy (1974–2004), murdered lesbian human rights defender from Sierra Leone
- Frank Eddy (1856–1929), American politician from Minnesota
- Gary Eddy (1945–2023), Australian sprinter in the 1964 Summer Olympics
- George A. Eddy (1907–1998), American economist
- Helen Jerome Eddy (1897–1990), American motion picture actress
- Henry Turner Eddy (1844–1921), American science and engineering educator
- Ian C. Eddy (1906–1976), decorated American submarine commander during World War II
- James R. Eddy (1931–2023), politician in the American state of Florida
- James Wade Eddy (1832–1916), American businessman, founder of Arizona Mineral Belt Railroad
- Jamie Eddy (born 1972), Canadian ice sledge hockey player
- Jerome Eddy (1829–1905), American businessman and politician from Michigan
- Jim Eddy (1936–2016), American football coach
- John Eddy (1915–1981), British sailor
- John A. Eddy (1931–2009), American astronomer
- Jonathan Eddy (c. 1726–1804), British-American soldier
- Kate Eddy (born 1996), Australian netball player
- Keith Eddy (1944–2022), English retired footballer
- Lori Eddy (born 1971), Canadian curler
- Manton S. Eddy (1892–1962), American general
- Mary Baker Eddy (1821–1910), the American founder of the Church of Christ, Scientist church
- Mary Pierson Eddy (1864–1923), religious and medical missionary
- Mike Eddy (1952–2025), American stock car auto racer
- Nelson Eddy (1901–1967), American singer
- Nick Eddy (born 1944), American pro football player
- Norman Eddy (1810–1872), American politician and military officer
- Paul L. Eddy (1899–1979), American farmer, businessman, and politician
- Ray Eddy (1911–1986), American college basketball coach
- Richard Eddy (clergyman) (1828–1906), American Universalist clergyman
- Richard Eddy (politician) (1882–1955), New Zealand labourer, trade unionist and member of the New Zealand Legislative Council
- Robert Eddy (born 1988), Australian rules footballer
- Roger Eddy (born 1946), Canadian former luger
- Roger L. Eddy (born 1958), member of the Illinois House of Representatives
- Ronald Eddy (c. 1931–2026), Canadian politician
- Samuel Eddy (1769–1839), U.S. Representative from Rhode Island
- Samuel E. Eddy (1822–1909), American soldier who fought in the American Civil War
- Sara Hershey-Eddy (née Sarah Hershey; 1837–1911), American musician
- Sarah J. Eddy (1851–1945), American artist, photographer and suffragette
- Sarah Stoddard Eddy (1831–1904), American social reformer and clubwoman
- Sean Eddy (born circa 1966), bioinformatician
- Shelia Eddy (born 1996), American convicted of murder
- Sherwood Eddy (1871–1963), American Protestant missionary, administrator and educator
- Sonya Eddy (1967–2022), American actress
- Spencer F. Eddy (1873–1939), American diplomat who served as U.S. Minister to Argentina and Romania
- Steve Eddy (born 1957), American baseball pitcher
- T. V. Eddy (1853–1918), American politician in the state of Washington
- Thomas Eddy (1758–1827), New York merchant, philanthropist and politician
- Thomas Mears Eddy (1823–1874), American clergyman and author
- Victor Eddy (born 1955), West Indies cricketer
- Walter John Eddy (1859–1947), Australian Baptist minister
- William A. Eddy (1896–1962), American academic and intelligence officer
- William Abner Eddy (1850–1909), American accountant and journalist famous for his experiments with kites
- William C. Eddy (1902–1989), American naval officer, submariner, engineer, television producer, educator, cartoonist, artist, inventor, entrepreneur, explorer, writer
- William F. Eddy (1852–1930), Canadian political figure from Saskatchewan
