= Thomas Eddy (disambiguation) =

Thomas Eddy (1758–1827) was a New York merchant, philanthropist and politician. Thomas Eddy may also refer to:

- T. V. Eddy (Thomas Valentine Eddy, 1853–1918), American politician in the state of Washington
- Thomas Mears Eddy (1823–1874), American clergyman and author

== See also ==
- Eddy Thomas (c. 1932–2014), Jamaican dancer, choreographer and dance instructor
- Thomas Eddy Tallmadge (1876–1940), American architect
- Thomas Eadie (1887–1974), U.S. Navy diver and a recipient of the Medal of Honor
- Thomas Wardrope Eadie (1898–1986), president of Bell Telephone of Canada
