= EDDI =

Eddi or EDDI may refer to:

== People ==
- Eddi Arent (1925–2013), German actor, cabaret artist and comedian
- Eddi Gomes (born 1988), Bissau-Guinean footballer
- Eddi Gutenkauf (born 1928), Luxembourgish fencer
- Eddi McKee, a fictional character on the BBC medical drama Holby City
- Eddi Nappi, bassist for American band Enemy
- Eddi Reader (born 1959), Scottish singer-songwriter
- Eddi Valenzuela (born 1982), Guatemalan boxer
- Eddi-Rue McClanahan (1934–2010), American actress
- Eddi La Marra, Italian motorcycle racer in the 2013 FIM Superstock 1000 Cup
- Eddi, a name for Stephen of Ripon, eighth-century author
- Eddi, a main character in the UK animated TV series Q Pootle 5
- Eddi McCandry, main character of the 1987 novel War for the Oaks by Emma Bull
- Eddi Projex, American rapper who often collaborates with Stevie Joe

== Other ==
- Ethylenediamine dihydroiodide (EDDI), a water-soluble salt
- EDDI, the ICAO code for Berlin Tempelhof Airport
- EDDI Inc., security company headed by American lawyer Donald E. deKieffer

== See also ==
- Eddy (surname) (including a list of people with the name)
- Eddie (disambiguation)
