= Mount Vernon College =

Mount Vernon College could refer to:

- Mount Vernon Seminary, a former name for Peru State College in Peru, Nebraska
- Mount Vernon College for Women, now a part of George Washington University
