= Richard Eddy =

Richard Eddy may refer to:

- Richard Eddy (clergyman) (1828–1906), American Universalist clergyman
- Richard Eddy (politician) (1882–1955), New Zealand labourer, trade unionist and member of the New Zealand Legislative Council
