= Robert Ingalls =

Robert Ingalls may refer to:

- Bob Ingalls (1919–1970), American football player and coach
- Robert I. Ingalls Sr. (1882–1951), American businessman and philanthropist
