= Mary Eddy =

Mary Eddy may refer to:

- Mary Baker Eddy (1821–1910), American author, and founder of Christian Science
- Mary Pierson Eddy (1864–1923), Syrian-born American religious and medical missionary
- Mary Eddy Kidder (1834–1910), American missionary and educator in Japan
