= Camber Corporation =

Defense contractor in Huntsville, Alabama

- Company type: Privately Held
- Industry: Aerospace and Defense
- Founded: Huntsville, Alabama (1990)
- Defunct: December 2, 2016
- Fate: Acquired by HII
- Headquarters: Huntsville, Alabama
- Area served: Worldwide
- Key people: Philip O. Nolan, Chief Executive Officer John Lord, President Huntsville Operations Mike Whyte, Senior Vice President and Chief Financial Officer Gene Kakalec, Executive Vice President, Corporate Development Bruce Schoemer, Senior Vice President & Manager, National Security & Intelligence Group Joe Reale, Senior Vice President, Contracts, Pricing & Procurement Jay Puckett, Vice President, Chief Information Officer Kelly Peevy, Vice President and Director of Administration
- Website: www.camber.com

Camber Corporation was a defense contractor headquartered in Huntsville, Alabama. It was acquired by Huntington Ingalls Industries on December 2, 2016, and was reorganized as a division within that company. Once that reorganization was completed, Camber Corporation ceased to exist.

== History and operations ==
Camber was founded as a Small Business Administration (SBA) 8(a) company in 1990. Within five years, the company was named in Inc. Magazine’s list of the fastest growing companies in the United States, specializing in aviation Sensors and Simulations; Chemical, Biological, Radiological, Nuclear, and Explosives (CBRNE) research and development; training and logical support; project management; training support; and information technology support. Its R&D, project management, logistical, training, and subject matter expert support activities supported and were often embedded in a variety of U.S. Government, state government, local government, and private sector entities, but primarily concentrated on the U.S. Department of Defense. Camber graduated from its SBA 8(a) status in 1998.

The company continued to evolve, and while it continued to remain headquartered in Alabama, it expanded to include a major corporate presence in the Washington, DC / National Capital Region and in dozens of other metropolitan areas and communities across the United States and overseas that hosted major U.S. military and U.S. Department of Homeland Security activities and installations.

By the beginning of the 21st century, Camber Corporation had developed a diverse corporate portfolio in Cyber, Intelligence, Unmanned Aircraft Systems, Engineering, Technology and Government Services Support. By December 2016, Camber employed approximately 1,700 professionals in over 100 locations in the U.S., Europe, the Middle East, and Asia while concurrently being assessed as ISO 9001:2008, ISO 20000, and CMMI-ML3 company.

Camber Corporation had personnel onsite at 100 locations in both the United States and various countries in Europe, Asia, and Africa, delivering daily interface on technical, programmatic, and operations issues. Its support aligned with the operational interests of every Unified Combatant Command in the U.S. Department of Defense; more than 150 Army, Air Force, Navy and Marine Corps programs; the National Guard Bureau and National Guard headquarters in every U.S. state, commonwealth, territory and the District of Columbia; and more than 25 North Atlantic Treaty Organization (NATO) or coalition countries in Europe, Asia, and Africa.

With particular strengths in cyber operations, systems engineering support, logistics management, and business and program support operations, Camber Corporation was an early provider of cyber simulations and has pioneered simulation-based acquisition efforts through endeavors such as the U.S. Army’s Simulation and Modeling for Acquisition, Requirements, and Training (SMART) initiative.

New Mountain Capital acquired Camber on December 1, 2008. On December 2, 2016, New Mountain Capital sold Camber Corporation to Huntington Ingalls Industries (HII). As part of its acquisition, HII reorganized Camber's assets and personnel into a new division called HII Technical Solutions (HII-TSD).

Camber Corporation later became part of HII’s "Technical Solutions division" within its Mission Driven Innovative Solutions (HII-MDIS) business unit.

In late 2021, with HII's acquisition of Alion Science and Technology, HII-MDIS, to include its legacy Camber Corporation remnant, was renamed Huntington Ingalls Industries Mission Technologies.
