= Titusville (Birmingham) =

- Birmingham Neighborhood
- Interactive map of Titusville
- Coordinates: 33°29′38.4″N 86°49′40.8″W
- Country: United States
- State: Alabama
- City: Birmingham
- Time zone: UTC-6 (CST)
  - Summer (DST): UTC-5 (CDT)
- ZIP Codes: 35211
- Area codes: 205, 659

Titusville /ˈtɪtəsvəl/ is a historic neighborhood in Birmingham, Alabama, United States, southeast of Ensley near UAB's campus. It is centered on 6th Avenue South between downtown Birmingham and Elmwood Cemetery. It includes its neighborhood associations with North Titusville, South Titusville, and Woodland Park.

== History ==
In 1910, Robert Ingersoll Ingalls, Sr. (1882–1951) founded Ingalls Iron Works in Titusville. (He later went on to found Ingalls Shipbuilding in Pascagoula, Mississippi in 1938).

Since the early twentieth century Titusville has been a neighborhood of middle-class African American families, including architect Wallace Rayfield; Secretary of State Condoleezza Rice; Freeman A. Hrabowski III, president of the University of Maryland, Baltimore County; Birmingham mayor William Bell; former Birmingham Mayor Larry Langford; Birmingham city councillor Carole Smitherman; and Pulitzer Prize-winning journalist Harold Jackson.

In June 1993, Titusville residents took the Birmingham city government to court in an attempt to block completion by Browning-Ferris Industries (BFI) of a garbage transfer station in their community. This action succeeded in halting the project and was widely celebrated as a grassroots victory over environmental racism. As of 2005 the city and county governments agreed to jointly purchase the former Trinity Steel Industries property in Titusville for redevelopment.

The neighborhood includes a high school, the Ullman High School, a public park, Memorial park, and several churches, including Westminster Presbyterian Church, where Condoleezza Rice's father and grandfather were pastors.

== See also ==
List of Birmingham neighborhoods
