= Barbara Ingalls Shook =

American heiress and philanthropist

- Born: September 28, 1938
- Died: September 26, 2008 (aged 69)
- Education: Mount Vernon College for Women
- Occupation: Philanthropist
- Spouse: Robert Paschal Shook
- Children: 2 daughters
- Relatives: Robert Ingersoll Ingalls Jr. (father); Robert Ingersoll Ingalls Sr. (paternal grandfather)

Barbara Ingalls Shook (1938–2008) was an American heiress and philanthropist. She was a prominent patron of the arts in Birmingham, Alabama. She also served on the advisory board of the National Cancer Institute in the Reagan administration.

== Early life ==
Ingalls Shook was born on September 28, 1938. Her paternal grandfather, Robert Ingersoll Ingalls Sr. (1882–1951), was the founder of Ingalls Iron Works, the largest privately owned steel manufacturer in the Southern United States, and Ingalls Shipbuilding, the largest shipyard in the Gulf Coast of the United States. She had a sister, Elesabeth Ingalls Gillet, and a step-brother Lathrop Winchester Smith.

She graduated from Mount Vernon Seminary and College in Washington, D.C. (which later merged with the George Washington University), with an associate degree in 1958.

== Philanthropy ==
She was a noted philanthropist in Birmingham, Alabama, through the Barbara Ingalls Shook Foundation. She was a patron to the Birmingham Museum of Art, Alabama Symphony Orchestra, and the Alabama Ballet. Her philanthropy extended to healthcare, as she donated to St. Vincent's Birmingham and the Montclair Baptist Medical Center. She also donated to the Jimmie Hale Mission, a homeless shelter; the Big Oak Ranch, a residence for at-risk youth; and the University of Alabama at Birmingham.

She was also active in philanthropy in Aspen, Colorado. She founded Challenge Aspen, a non-profit organization to support sports among the disabled in Aspen.

She was also a distinguished philanthropist nationally. President Ronald Reagan appointed her to the advisory board of the National Cancer Institute. As a result, she received the Woman of the Year award from the Memorial Sloan Kettering Cancer Center in 1986. She was also honored posthumously at the Hope Gala hosted by the American Cancer Society in 2009.

== Personal life ==
She married Robert Paschal Shook. They had two daughters, Ellen Gregg Shook and Elesabeth Ridgely Shook. They resided in Mountain Brook, Alabama; Aspen, Colorado; and Palm Beach, Florida.

In 1969, she survived cancer, but lost a leg through surgery. She walked with an artificial leg for the rest of her adult life. She enjoyed skiing, playing golf and fly-fishing.

== Death ==
She died on September 26, 2008, at the age of sixty-nine. Seven years later, the Birmingham Zoo opened a new exhibit named after her known as the Barbara Ingalls Shook Black Bear Trail. It is home to American black bears from Big Sky, Montana.
