= Elizabeth J. Somers =

Elizabeth J. Somers (November 5, 1837 – June 8, 1924) was an American educator. She founded the Mount Vernon Seminary in Washington, D.C. in 1875.

== Early life, education, and teaching career ==
Elizabeth Somers was born Elizabeth Jane ("Jennie") Eddy on November 5, 1837, in Richland Township, Indiana. Elizabeth attended Ohio Wesleyan Female College and graduated in 1855 with the degree of Mistress of English Literature. After graduating, Elizabeth accepted a position at Northwestern Female College in Evanston, Illinois. She left Evanston in 1859 for a position at Pittsburgh Female Seminary where she worked for two years. She then worked in Centerville, Indiana from 1862 to 1863.

Elizabeth married James W. Somers, a lawyer, in early 1863 and left a teaching position in Centerville to move to Washington, D.C. Somers continued her career teaching mathematics at a day school and bible classes at the Metropolitan Methodist Church. In 1868, Somers' accepted Judge Dennis Nelson Cooley's three young daughters as her first students in her home on 204 F. Street, NW in Washington, D.C. She began teaching boys and girls but by 1870 only offered instruction to young women.

== Mount Vernon Seminary ==
In 1875, Somers opened the Mount Vernon Seminary with a rigorous curriculum for girls as well as young women preparing for college. At the time, Somers offered the only higher education institution for women in Washington, D.C. Mount Vernon Seminary quickly earned an esteemed reputation for the refined academic and social education of young women in Washington, D.C. Mount Vernon first attracted prominent Washington officials' daughters but soon also many young women from around the world.

Elizabeth Somers' school was named Mount Vernon Seminary in honor of her late brother, Thomas Mears Eddy, a respected Methodist minister, who helped found the Mount Vernon Place Methodist Church in Baltimore, Maryland, in 1872. In 1880, Somers moved the school from 201 F Street, NW to 1100 M Street, NW to meet the demands of increasing enrollment. The school remained at 1100 M Street until 1917 and underwent numerous physical expansions as it accepted more students. Mrs. Somers would later move the school again to Nebraska Avenue in 1917. In 1927, Mount Vernon Seminary included a Junior College and by 1969 was known as Mount Vernon Junior College. The school became an accredited four-year college in 1976. Mount Vernon College for Women relocated a couple of times thereafter until it merged with The George Washington University in 1999. It is now known as the Mount Vernon Campus of The George Washington University.

== Legacy ==
Elizabeth J. Somers died in Washington on June 8, 1924, and was buried in Indianapolis, Indiana.

In 1945, Somers Hall was built on Mount Vernon Campus and now houses the women of the selective Elizabeth Somers Women's Leadership Program at the George Washington University. The Leadership Program was established for freshman undergraduate women of The George Washington University to continue Somers' vision of excellence and leadership of women.

A collection of papers and memorabilia related to Somers is maintained by the Special Collections Research Center of The George Washington University. The collection includes correspondence, photographs, financial records, and textiles. In addition to information on Somers, the collection also includes historical information on Mount Vernon Seminary.
