= Frances Nash Watson =

American pianist

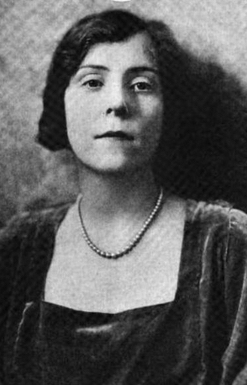
- Born: Frances Nash; July 8, 1890; Omaha, Nebraska, United States
- Died: December 20, 1971 (aged 81); Charlottesville, Virginia, United States
- Occupation: Pianist
- Spouse: Edwin "Pa" Watson

Frances Nash Watson (July 8, 1890 – December 20, 1971) was an American concert pianist and composer. In the 1920s, she was part of a musical trio with Elisabeth of Bavaria, Queen of the Belgians, and Albert Einstein. Later in life she was prominent in social and musical circles in Washington, D.C.

== Early life ==
Frances Nash was born in Omaha, Nebraska and raised in New York City, the daughter of Edward Watrous Nash and Catherine Barbeau Nash. Her father was a wealthy manufacturer. She graduated from Mount Vernon Seminary, and studied piano in New York City with Bruno Oscar Klein, in Boston with Georges Longy, and in Europe with several musicians as a young woman.

== Career ==
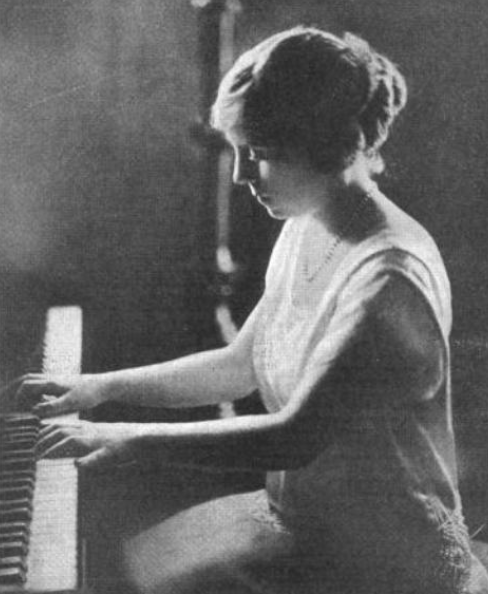
Frances Nash, from a 1919 publication

Nash made her concert debut in 1914, playing Chopin with the Berlin Philharmonic. Her American debut came in 1915, in Omaha, before she toured with tenor George Hamlin in the central and western states that year. She played recitals at New York's Carnegie Hall in 1916, and at Aeolian Hall in 1919 and 1923. She also played in a string trio with cellist May Mukle and violist and composer Rebecca Clarke. When 1918 concert dates were postponed because of the Spanish flu epidemic, she played outdoor patriotic programs at Camp Upton and elsewhere.

While her husband was serving as a military attaché in Europe, she befriended Queen Elizabeth of Belgium; the two women shared a love of playing music, and they formed a trio with physicist Albert Einstein, playing for hours together. Back in the United States after 1933, she played at the White House during the Roosevelt administration, and appeared as a soloist with the National Symphony Orchestra. In her later years, she remained active in supporting musical organizations and events in Washington.

Nash wrote “Canzonetta, d’Ambrosia" for piano, and played for the piano roll recording of that work and several others, for the American Piano Company (Ampico).

== Personal life ==
In 1920, in Paris, Nash married Edwin Martin "Pa" Watson, who became a United States Army general and military attaché. The Watsons lived at Kenwood, on land once owned by Thomas Jefferson, in a house designed by William Adams Delano. Her husband died in 1945, and she died in 1971, aged 81, in Charlottesville, Virginia. Her grave is with her husband's grave, in Arlington National Cemetery. The Watsons' papers are in the University of Virginia Library. Scrapbooks belonging to the Watsons are in the Thomas Jefferson Foundation Archives at Monticello.
