= USS Pargo (SS-264) =

Submarine of the United States

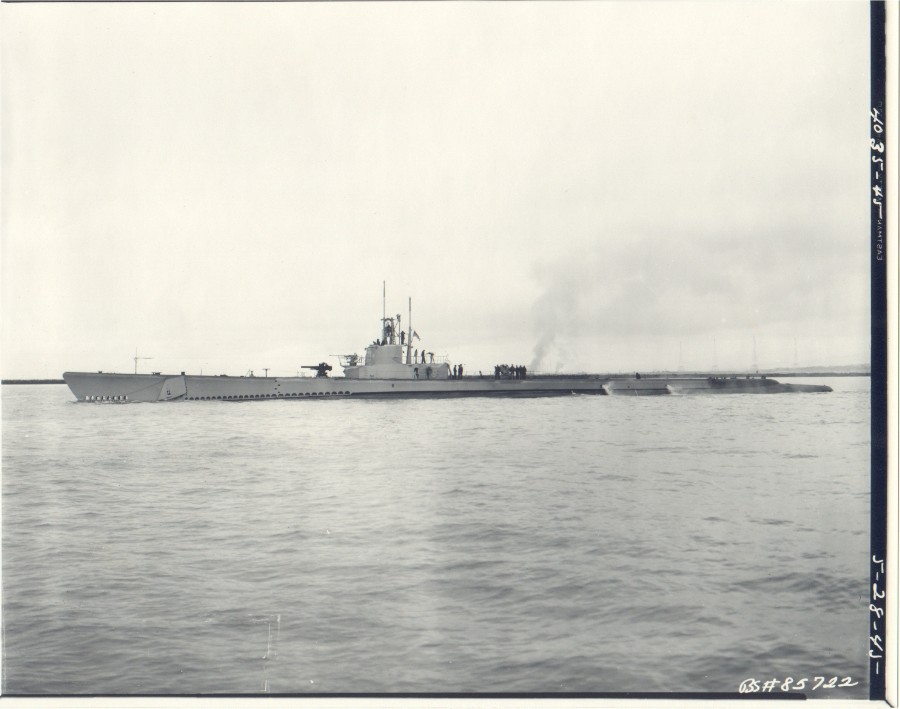

History

United States
- Builder: Electric Boat Company, Groton, Connecticut
- Laid down: 21 May 1942
- Launched: 24 January 1943
- Commissioned: 26 April 1943
- Decommissioned: 12 June 1946
- Stricken: 1 December 1960
- Fate: Sold for scrap, 16 May 1961

General characteristics
- Class & type: Gato-class diesel-electric submarine
- Displacement: 1,525 tons (1,549 t) surfaced; 2,424 tons (2,460 t) submerged
- Length: 311 ft 9 in (95.02 m)
- Beam: 27 ft 3 in (8.31 m)
- Draft: 17 ft 0 in (5.18 m) maximum
- Installed power: 5,400 shp (4.0 MW) surfaced; 2,740 shp (2.0 MW) submerged
- Propulsion: 4 × Hooven-Owens-Rentschler (H.O.R.) diesel engines driving electric generators; 2 × 126-cell Sargo batteries; 4 × high-speed Allis-Chalmers electric motors with reduction gears; two propellers
- Speed: 21 knots (39 km/h) surfaced; 9 knots (17 km/h) submerged
- Range: 11,000 NM (20,000 km) surfaced at 10 knots (19 km/h)
- Endurance: 48 hours at 2 knots (4 km/h) submerged; 75 days on patrol
- Test depth: 300 ft (90 m)
- Complement: 6 officers, 54 enlisted
- Armament: 10 × 21-inch (533 mm) torpedo tubes; 6 forward, 4 aft; 24 torpedoes; 1 × 3-inch (76 mm) / 50 caliber deck gun; Bofors 40 mm and Oerlikon 20 mm cannon

USS Pargo (SS-264), a Gato-class submarine, was the first ship of the United States Navy to be named for the pargo, a fish of the genus Lutjanus found in the West Indies.

== Construction and commissioning ==
Pargo was laid down on 21 May 1942 by the Electric Boat Company at Groton, Connecticut; launched 24 January 1943, sponsored by Miss Belle W. Baruch; and commissioned on 26 April 1943, Lieutenant Commander Ian C. Eddy in command.

== First and second war patrols, August – December 1943 ==
Following shakedown and training, Pargo sailed via the Panama Canal to Pearl Harbor, arriving 23 July 1943. The first of her eight war patrols began 18 August and took her into the East China Sea, where she twice attacked the enemy, inflicting undetermined damage to several ships before returning to Pearl Harbor 6 October.

After refitting, Pargo sailed 30 October in company with Snook and Harder in a wolfpack. The efforts of the three were well directed against the open sea area northwest of the Marianas where Pargo sank two freighters, Manju Maru and Shoko Maru, totaling 7,810 tons, on 29 and 30 November.

== Third, fourth, and fifth war patrols, March – October 1944 ==
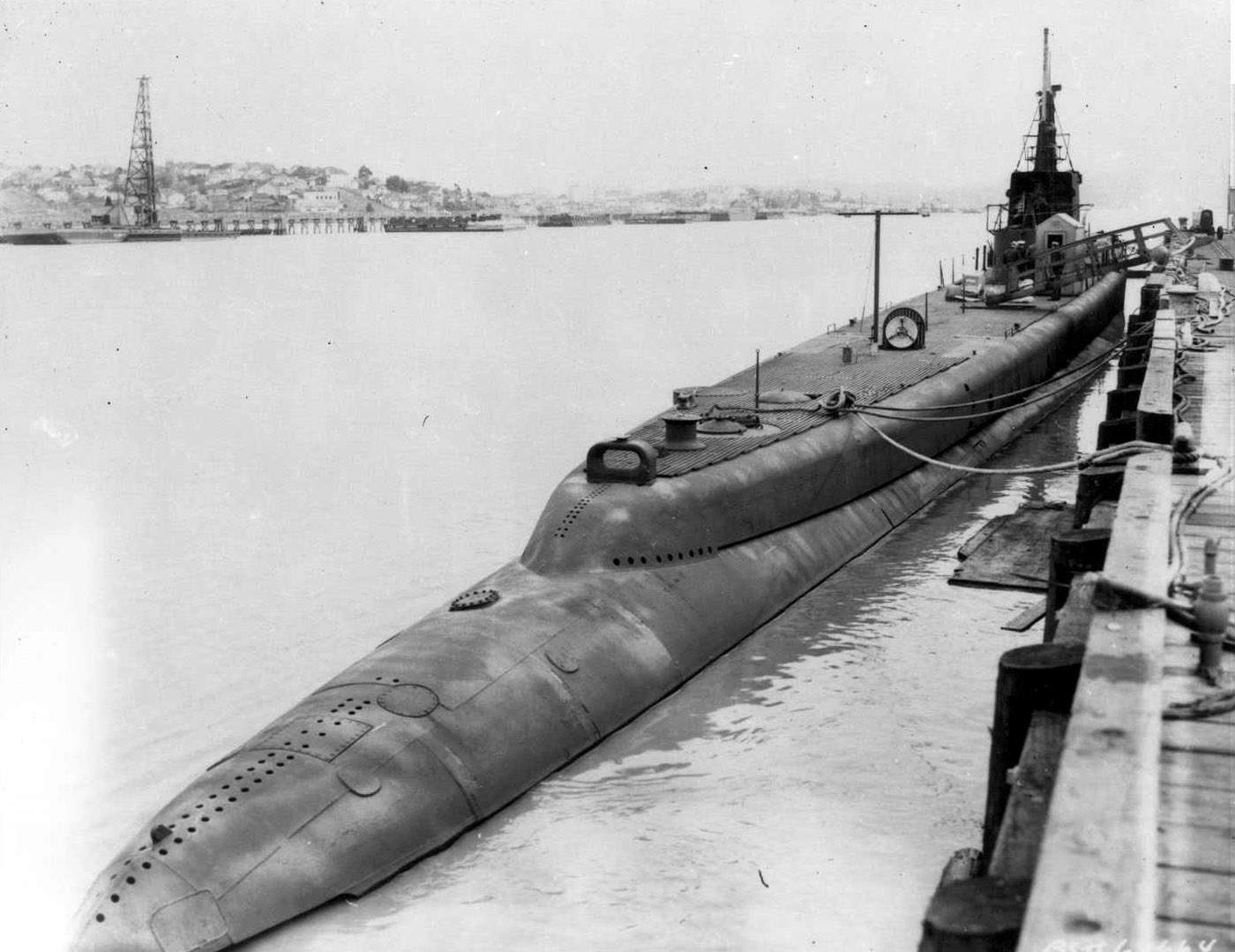
This stern view of the Pargo (SS-264) was taken on 4 March 1944 during refit at Mare Island.

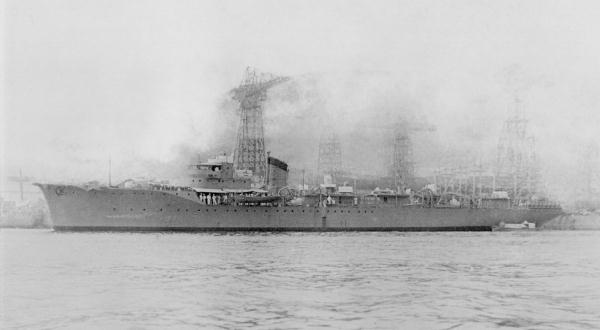
IJN "Aotaka" sunk by Pargo 26 Sep 1944

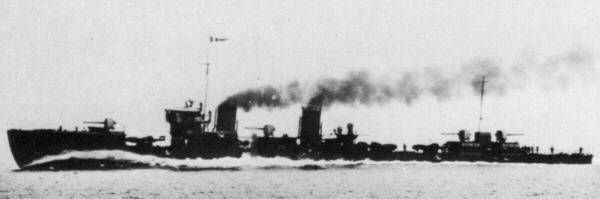
IJN "Nokaze" sunk by Pargo 20 Feb 1945

Pargo next underwent overhaul and received a new engine at Mare Island Naval Shipyard. On 5 March 1944, she was underway for Pearl Harbor and on 25 March began her third war patrol. Her mission, to destroy enemy ships in the Philippine and Celebes Seas areas, was carried out with several attacks, one of which sank an ex-net tender. Pargo began refitting at Fremantle, Australia, on 24 May.

Underway 13 June for the Celebes Sea, Pargo noted fewer ships present in the area. She scored well again, however, damaging several and sinking a 5,236-ton cargo ship, Yamagibu Maru.

Griffin (AS-13) refitted Pargo at Fremantle to prepare her for her next patrol. From 3 September to 7 October, she ranged the South China Sea, pressing her attacks to damage several Japanese ships and to sink two more, including a minelayer.

On 24 August 1944, LCDR David B. Bell took command of USS Pargo from CDR Ian C. Eddy.

== Sixth and seventh war patrols, October 1944 – March 1945 ==
On 28 October, Pargo sailed from western Australian waters in company with Haddo for her sixth patrol. From Exmouth Gulf, she continued alone into the South China Sea, where she found that increased allied air activity had further diminished use of the shipping lanes. She sank the tanker Yuho Maru off Brunei Bay on 26 November. Following this action, she received from escorts the worst depth-charge attack of her career, but escaped without serious damage, and returned to Australia on 21 December.

Replenishment and retraining ensued, and on 15 January 1945, Pargo got underway for the Indo-China coast. Six days out, she launched a night torpedo attack that damaged several ships. On 10 February, she again engaged the enemy and 10 days later blew up destroyer Nokaze. Pargo then sailed via Saipan and Pearl Harbor to Mare Island for a modernization overhaul, which lasted from 25 March to 17 June.

== Eighth war patrol, July – September 1945 ==
The submarine's eighth and final patrol spanned the 42-day interval from 14 July to 9 September. Transiting the minefields of Tsushima Straits, she entered the Sea of Japan, where she attacked a six-ship convoy. She made her last sinking on 8 August, the passenger-cargo ship Rashin Maru, to total nine for the war. After Japanese capitulation, Pargo remained in the mine-filled waters until after the peace terms were signed and then sailed for Guam.

Returning to Pearl Harbor with the knowledge that she had contributed materially to the victory in the Pacific, Pargo assumed postwar duties as part of the squadron based there. She was decommissioned 12 June 1946 and was assigned to train naval reservists in the 13th Naval District, where she remained until 1 June 1960, when her name was struck from the Navy List. Pargo was sold on 17 April 1961.

Pargo received eight battle stars for World War II service. All eight of her war patrols were designated as "successful". She is credited with having sunk a total of 27,983 tons of enemy shipping.
