= Catherine Eddy Beveridge =

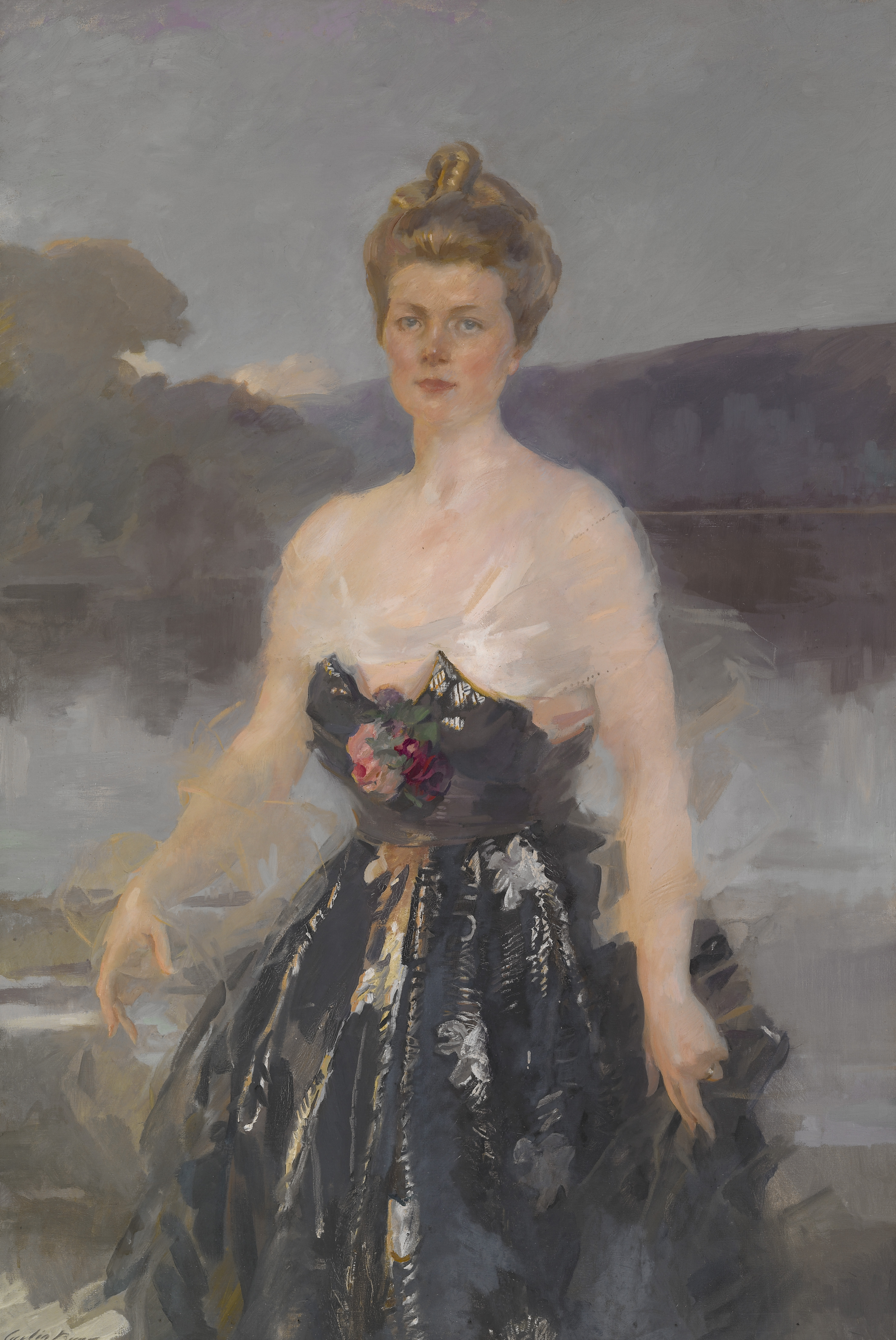
- Portrait of Mrs. Albert J. Beveridge, by Cecilia Beaux, 1916
- Born: Catherine Eddy; June 29, 1881; Chicago, Illinois, U.S.
- Died: May 28, 1970 (aged 88); Fort Lauderdale, Florida, U.S.
- Burial place: Crown Hill Cemetery and Arboretum, Section 45, Lot 22; 39.8199674°N 86.1705874°W
- Spouse: Albert J. Beveridge (m. 1907; died 1927)
- Children: 2
- Relatives: Spencer F. Eddy (brother); Thomas Mears Eddy (grandfather)

Catherine Eddy Beveridge (June 29, 1881 – May 28, 1970) was a socialite and philanthropist who came from a prominent Chicago, Illinois, family.

== Early life ==
Catherine was born in Chicago, Illinois, on June 29, 1881. She was the only daughter of Augustus Newlands Eddy and Abby Louisa (née Spencer) Eddy. Her older brother, Spencer F. Eddy, was a diplomat. Her father made his fortune as a businessman and her mother was a member of a family who ran a successful hardware business.

Her paternal grandparents were the Rev. Thomas Mears Eddy and Anna (née White) Eddy. Her maternal grandparents were Rachel (née Macomber) Spencer and Franklin Fayette Spencer, a founder of Hibbard, Spencer, Bartlett & Co.

Like many wealthy young women at the time, Catherine received an education in the humanities and traveled extensively. In the winter of 1902, she debuted at the court of Russian Tsar Nicholas II, after which fresh asparagus was served to the 1,500 dinner guests.

== Personal life ==
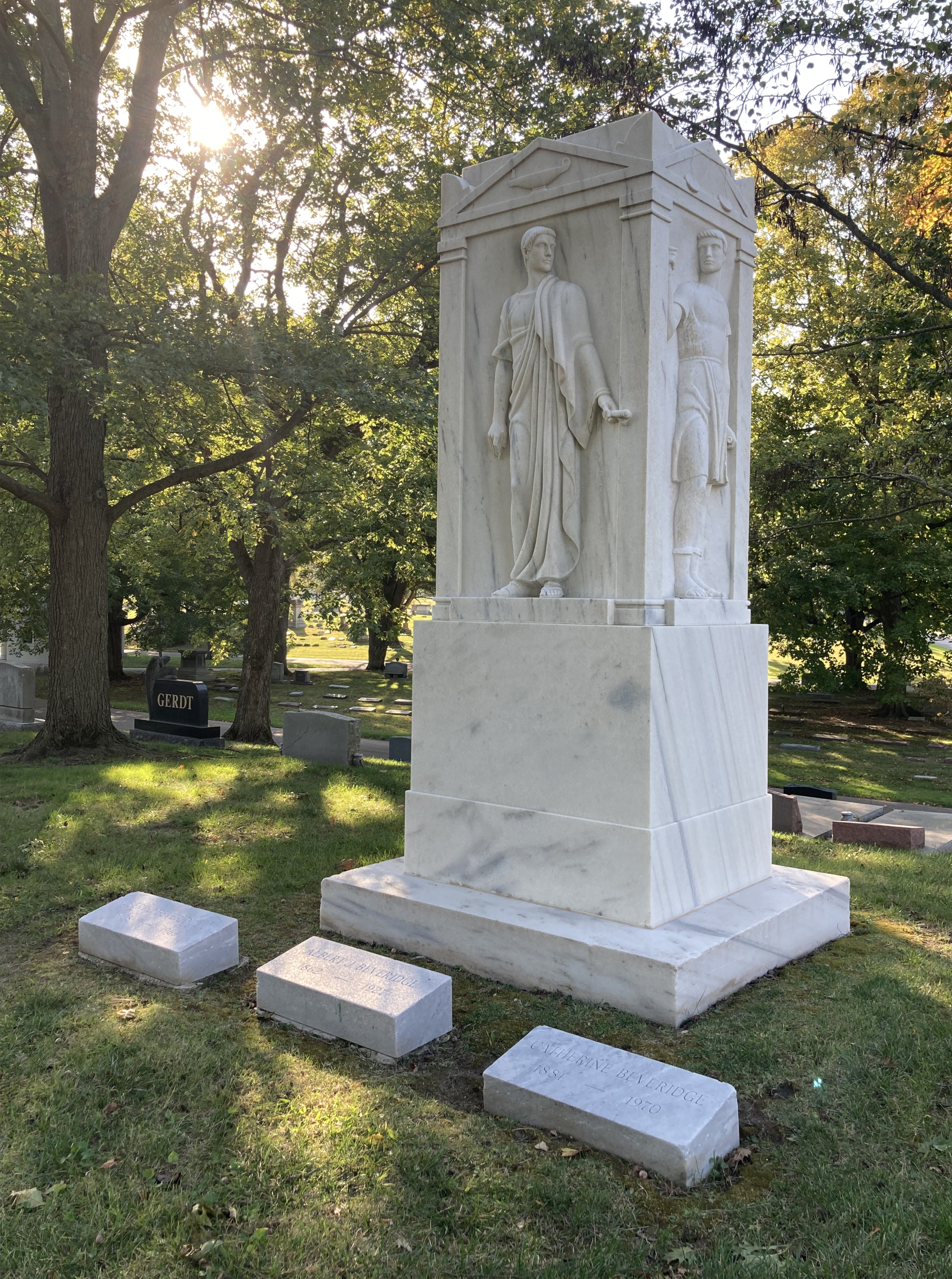
Beveridge's grave at Crown Hill Cemetery

In 1907 much to the chagrin of her role models and mentors, her mother Abby Eddy and her aunt Delia Caton Field, Catherine married Albert J. Beveridge (1862–1927), the Republican senator from Indiana, who served from 1899 to 1911. The couple raised two children in Indianapolis, Indiana, and Beverly Farms, Massachusetts, and also spent substantial time in Washington, D.C. The couple had a passionate marriage, and according to their grandson, about the only thing that they ever fought about was his smoking, which she did not like. They had two children.

After her husband's 1927 death, Beveridge became a prolific philanthropist of the arts, donating to institutions throughout the country, including the National Gallery of Art, and the Art Institute of Chicago, and the Art Institute of Indianapolis. She helped establish the Albert J. Beveridge Award for American historians in 1939.

Beveridge died on May 28, 1970, at her home in Ft. Lauderdale, Florida, and was buried at Crown Hill Cemetery in Indianapolis. She was memorialized in the 2005 book The Chronicle of Catherine Eddy Beveridge: An American Girl Travels into the Twentieth Century, by her grandson and Chicago writer Susan Radomsky.
