= Edwin M. Watson =

United States Army general

Pa Watson
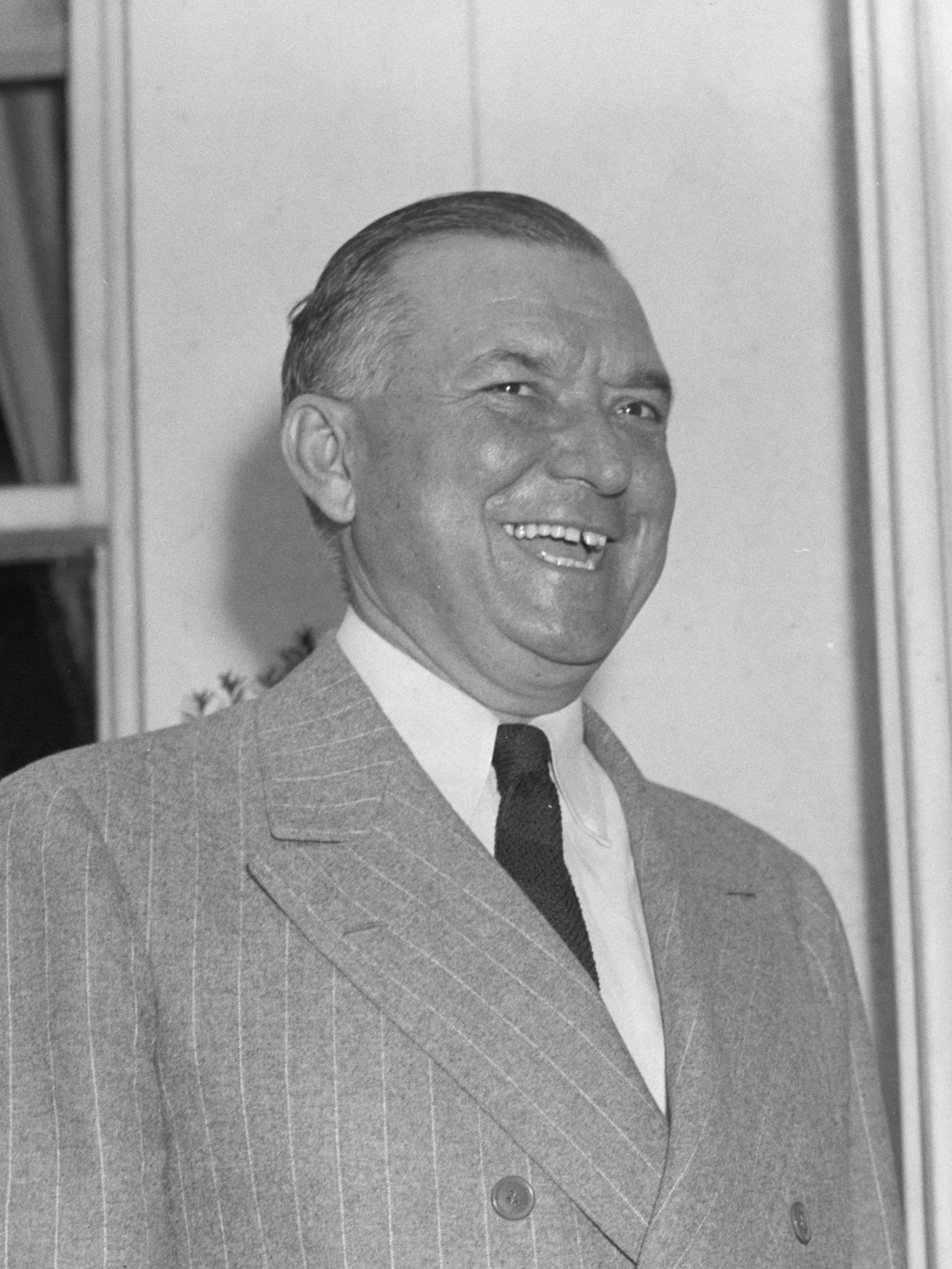

White House Appointments Secretary
- In office 1938–1945
- President: Franklin D. Roosevelt
- Preceded by: Marvin H. McIntyre
- Succeeded by: Matthew J. Connelly

Personal details
- Born: Edwin Martin Watson; December 10, 1883 Eufaula, Alabama, U.S.
- Died: February 20, 1945 (aged 61) USS Quincy, North Atlantic
- Resting place: Arlington National Cemetery
- Party: Democratic
- Education: United States Military Academy (BS)

Military service
- Allegiance: United States
- Branch/service: United States Army
- Years of service: 1908–1945
- Rank: Major General
- Battles/wars: World War I World War II
- Awards: Distinguished Service Medal (posthumous); Silver Star (2); Croix de Guerre (France)

Edwin Martin "Pa" Watson (December 10, 1883 – February 20, 1945) was a U.S. Army major general and a friend and senior aide to President Franklin Roosevelt, serving both as a military advisor and appointments secretary, a role that is now encompassed under the duties of the White House chief of staff.

== Early life and career ==
Edwin M. Watson was born on December 10, 1883, in Eufaula, Alabama. Raised in Virginia, he was the son of a businessman in the tobacco industry.

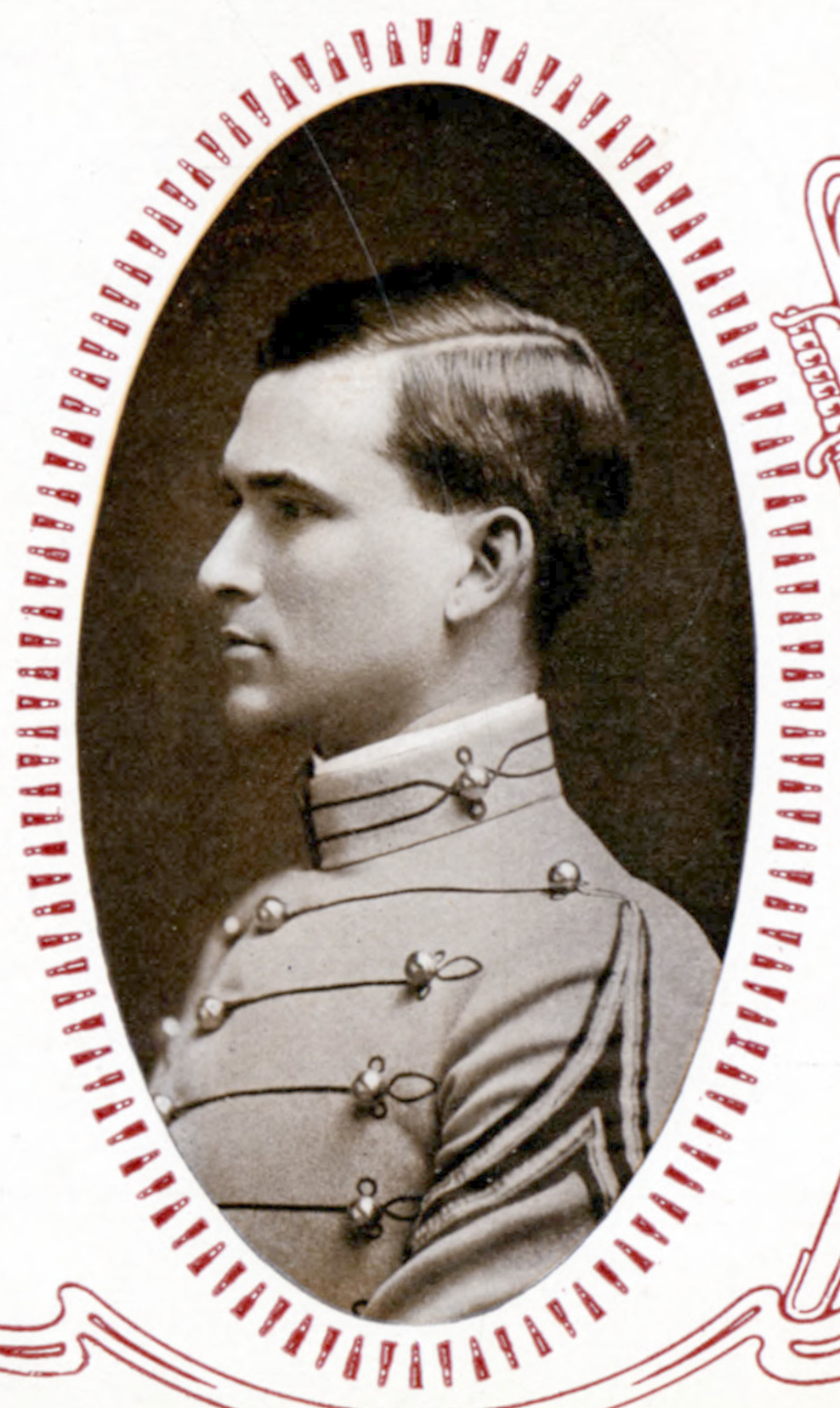
At West Point in 1908

He attended the United States Military Academy at West Point, among contemporaries George S. Patton and Jonathan Wainwright. Watson entered with the Class of 1906 on June 16, 1902, but was discharged for a deficiency in mathematics on April 9, 1903. He was readmitted as a plebe on August 23, 1903, but resigned in the middle of his third class year on December 29, 1904. He re-entered the academy as a member of the third class in August 1905 and graduated in the Class of 1908.

His classmates gave him the nickname "Paw", with his yearbook entry joking,

"Paw" is the original cadet. Men that entered the Academy with him are now fast approaching their captaincies. Why some even claim that "Paw" was at West Point before Marshall entered the V.M.I., but this has never been proven.

He was commissioned a second lieutenant in the Infantry. In 1908 he was elected as a member of the Virginia Society of the Cincinnati by right of his descent from Captain William Penn of the 1st Continental Dragoons who died in service in 1777.

Watson served overseas twice, in the Philippines and Mexico, before he was transferred back to the United States in 1915. There, he gained his first experience with presidential service by acting as a junior military aide to President Woodrow Wilson. He transferred from the infantry to the field artillery on January 13, 1917.

Shortly after America's entry into the First World War in April 1917, Watson requested an active duty assignment with the American Expeditionary Force that was heading for the front in France. He served there for the remainder of the war, earning two Silver Stars from the U.S. Army and the Croix de Guerre from the French government. He remained in France for the Paris Peace Conference to write the Treaty of Versailles, which formally ended the First World War. There, he again worked for the adoption of President Wilson's Fourteen Points to guide the postwar world.

Watson graduated from the advanced course at the Field Artillery School in 1924 and the Command and General Staff School in 1927. He served in Brussels from 1927 to 1931 as military attaché to Belgium, the Netherlands and Luxembourg.

== Association with Roosevelt ==
Watson would continue this pattern of service until becoming Senior Military Aide to the newly-inaugurated President Franklin D. Roosevelt in 1933. He was promoted to colonel on May 1, 1937, brigadier general on April 1, 1939, and major general on October 3, 1940. Watson helped Roosevelt navigate the bureaucracy of the War Department and the Army, especially during the crucial years prior to America's entry into the Second World War. He was also appointed the President's Appointments secretary in 1938 after the illness of the previous secretary, Marvin H. McIntyre, prevented him from continuing with his duties, managing access to the President and dictating the tenor of his daily schedule.

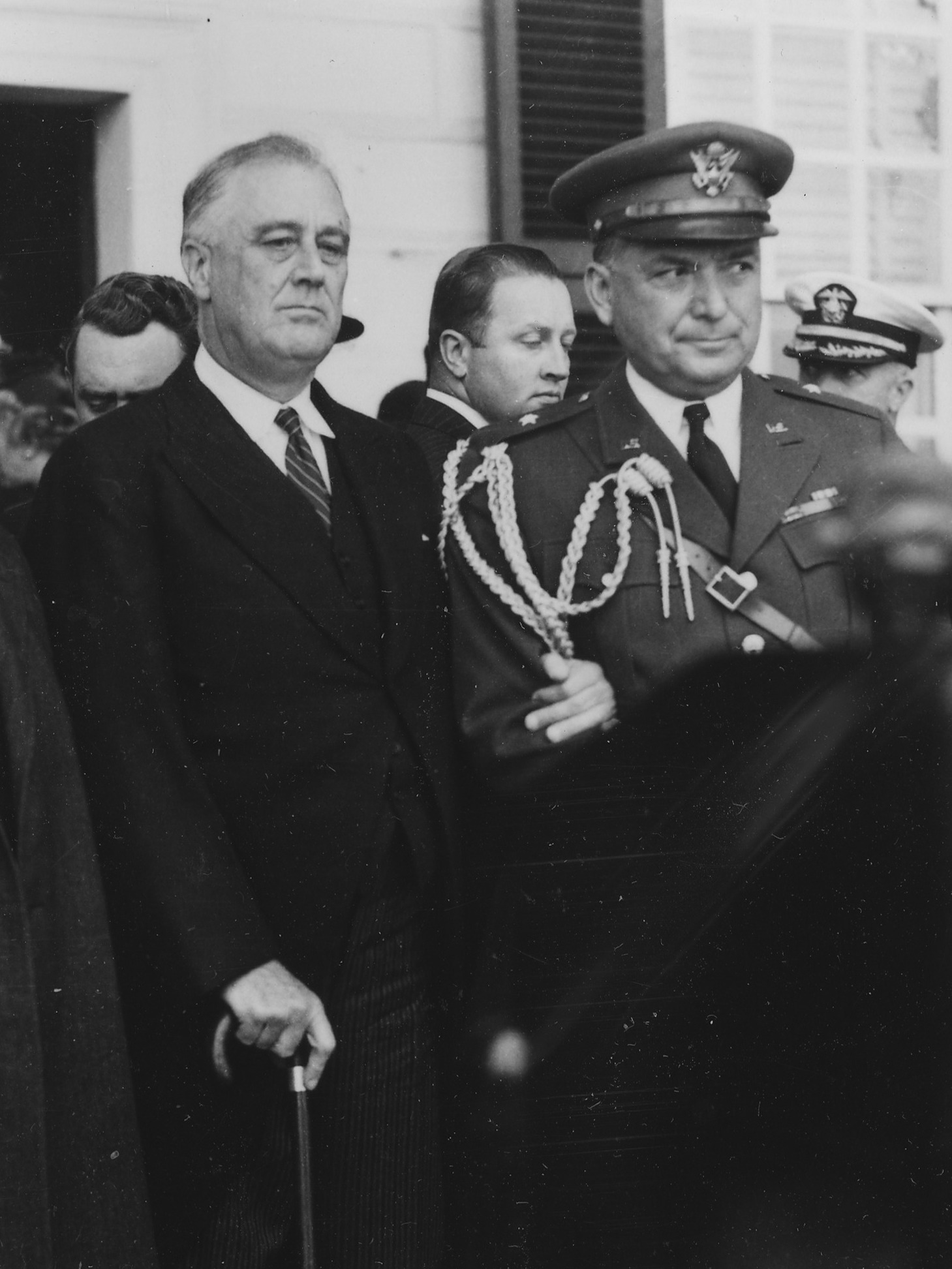
Watson helping President Roosevelt stand at a 1939 event

Watson lived with his wife, the professional pianist Frances Nash Watson, on a Virginia estate called Kenwood. The land, just beyond Monticello, was once owned by Thomas Jefferson, and the estate house was designed by Roosevelt's cousin, the celebrated architect William A. Delano. Watson and Roosevelt were personally close above and beyond their close professional ties, and Roosevelt adopted Kenwood as his "Camp David" during his presidency and retreated there on several occasions for vacation. The guest cottage was built in 1940-41 for Roosevelt, but he stayed there on only one occasion, preferring the social activity of the main house. On subsequent visits, including four days in June 1944 while he was awaiting the Normandy invasion, Roosevelt slept in the front bedroom of the main house. Mrs. Watson later bequeathed Kenwood to the University of Virginia, which, in turn, has leased the property to the Thomas Jefferson Foundation.

Watson and Roosevelt's son James were the ones who enabled Roosevelt to stand and to walk on the occasions when he did. Roosevelt had to wear steel braces. Watson and James would on those occasions support him on his left arm.

By virtue of his proximity to the President, Watson was present at some of the defining moments of the Second World War. These included a meeting about the Einstein–Szilard letter, which would eventually lead to the creation of the Manhattan Project, and Roosevelt's agreement to the Atlantic Charter alongside British Prime Minister Winston Churchill, providing a framework for those values that would guide the postwar world. He was in constant contact with Generals Dwight D. Eisenhower and Douglas MacArthur and Admiral Chester W. Nimitz. He attended the Tehran Conference, where the first of the negotiations between Roosevelt, Churchill, and Soviet Premier Joseph Stalin took place. For medical reasons, Watson was placed on the Army retired list on January 31, 1944. Although in poor health, he attended the Yalta Conference in February 1945 as well, where the Big Three negotiated for the future of Europe. On the return voyage, he suffered a fatal cerebral hemorrhage and died at sea aboard USS Quincy on February 20, 1945.

Watson was buried in Arlington Cemetery with the President in attendance. The President himself died two months later in April.

The War Department, in recognition of his service, posthumously awarded him the Distinguished Service Medal, which was presented by President Harry Truman and by Eleanor Roosevelt to his widow, Frances Nash Watson.

== Awards ==
- Distinguished Service Medal
- Silver Star with oak leaf cluster
- Mexican Border Service Medal
- Victory Medal
- American Defense Service Medal
- American Campaign Medal
- European-African-Middle Eastern Campaign Medal
- World War II Victory Medal

== Dates of rank ==
Insignia	Rank	Component	Date
No pin insignia	Second Lieutenant	Regular Army	14 February 1908
	First Lieutenant	Regular Army	10 September 1915
	Captain	Regular Army	15 May 1917
	Major	National Army	5 August 1917
	Lieutenant Colonel	National Army	11 September 1918
	Reverted to permanent rank of Captain	Regular Army	20 May 1920
	Major	Regular Army	1 July 1920
	Lieutenant Colonel	Regular Army	1 July 1932
	Colonel	Regular Army	1 May 1937
	Brigadier General	Regular Army	1 April 1939
	Major General	Army of the United States	1 October 1940
	Major General	Retired List	31 January 1944

Political offices
Preceded by Marvin H. McIntyre	White House Appointments Secretary; 1938–1945	Succeeded by Matthew J. Connelly
