= Samuel Edwin Eddy =

Samuel E. Eddy
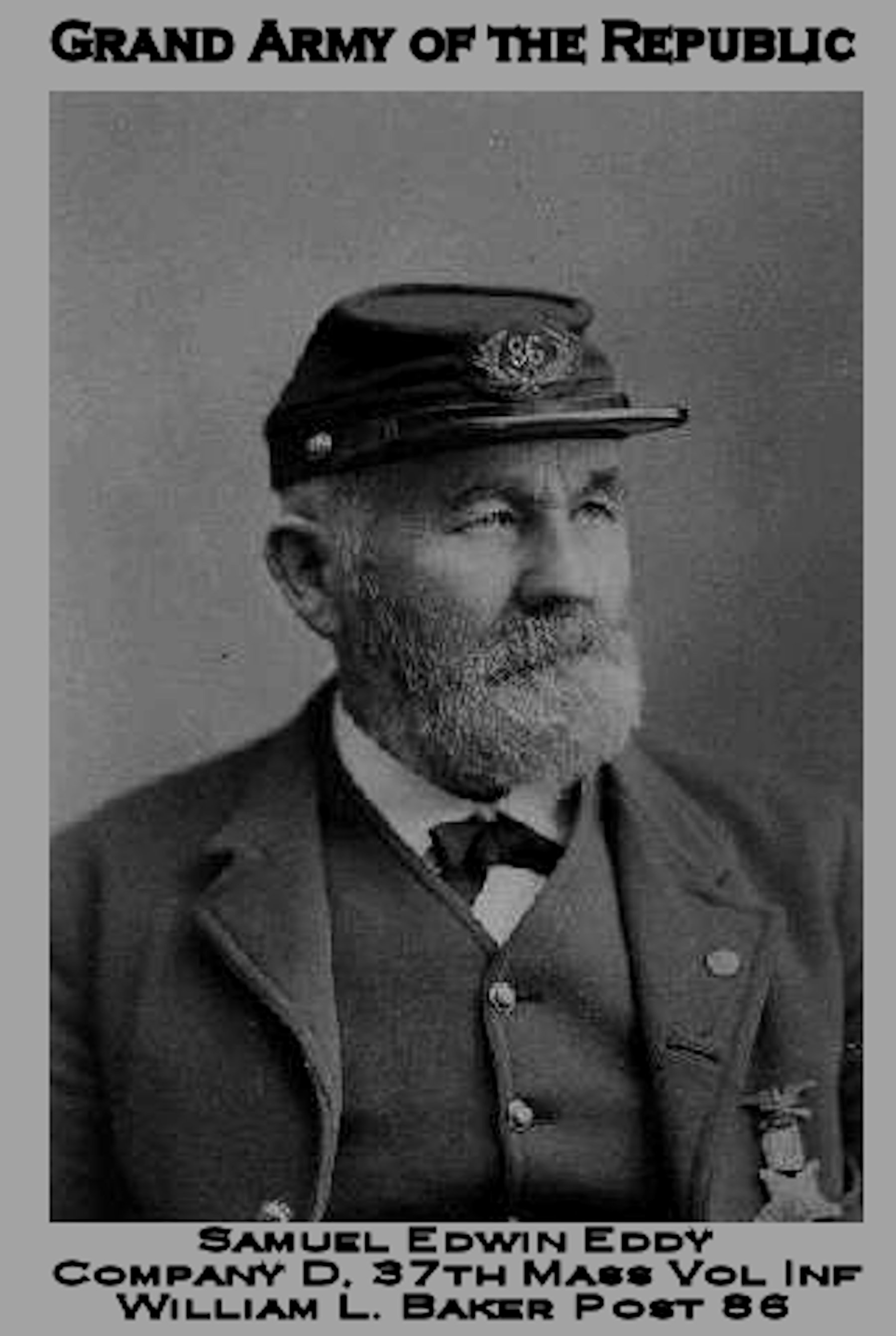
- Eddy in 1898
- Born: June 2, 1822; Whitingham, Vermont, US
- Died: March 7, 1909 (aged 86); Chesterfield, Massachusetts, US
- Burial place: Mount Cemetery; Chesterfield, Massachusetts
- Military career
- Allegiance: United States
- Branch: United States Army
- Service years: 1862–1865
- Rank: Private
- Units: Company D, 37th Massachusetts Volunteer Infantry Regiment
- Conflicts: Battle of Sayler's Creek
- Awards: Medal of Honor

Private Samuel Edwin Eddy (June 2, 1822 – March 7, 1909) was an American soldier who fought in the American Civil War. Eddy received the country's highest award for bravery during combat, the Medal of Honor, for his action during the Battle of Sayler's Creek in Virginia on 6 April 1865. He was honored with the award on 10 September 1897.

== Biography ==
Eddy was born in Whitingham, Vermont on June 2, 1822. He grew up there and became a blacksmith and woodturner. In the 1840s, he moved to Chesterfield, Massachusetts to work for H. B. Smith. In that town he met and married Sarah Deliza Todd on July 3, 1849. Before the Civil War, they had three children, two daughters and a son.

When the war broke out, he joined the Army from Chesterfield, Massachusetts on J23 July 1862. The forty-year-old blacksmith joined other men from the far western counties of Massachusetts in making up the core of the regiment. Eddy and his regiment served through the end of the war in the Army of the Potomac. They first saw action in the Fredericksburg Campaign in the 2nd Brigade of the 3rd Division of VI Corps under Burnside. They remained in that brigade through Chancellorsville and Gettysburg Campaigns. They were detached after Gettysburg to help quell the draft riot in New York City.

Due to the detached duty, they missed the Bristoe Campaign but returned again to their brigade for the Mine Run Campaign in November 1863. During the reorganization with the arrival of Grant, Eddy and the 37th remained in VI Corps but were now in the 4th Brigade of the 2nd Division. They remained with that brigade through the end of the war. In May and June, Eddy and his mates were joined by men from the 7th and the 10th Massachusetts Between the Second Battle of Petersburg and the Battle of the Crater, the blacksmith and his regiment were issued new Spencer repeating rifle, on July 15, 1864, increasing their firepower. They carried these through the remainder of the Richmond-Petersburg. and Appomattox Campaigns.

It was after the victory at Petersburg, during the Battle of Sayler's Creek, that the forty-two-year-old performed the deeds that earned him the Medal of Honor. He recovered from his wounds after the battle and mustered out with his regiment in June 1865.

Upon his return to his wife and children, he resumed his employment at H.B. Smith where he would work until 1886. On May 10, 1867, Deliza and Samuel welcomed their second son and fourth child. In 1866, Union soldier, sailor, and Marine veterans had formed the veterans organization The Grand Army of the Republic and the William L. Baker Post G. A. R. Post 86 was established in Northampton, Massachusetts on August 4, 1882. Upon his retirement at age 65, he joined Post 86. He remained active in the G.A.R. to his death.

During one of the periodic review of the official records, his performance at Sayler's Creek was put forward for the Medal of Honor. He received the award 10 September 1897.

When Eddy died on 7 March 1909, he was interred at the Mount Cemetery in Chesterfield, Massachusetts.

== Medal of Honor citation ==
The President of the United States of America, in the name of Congress, takes pleasure in presenting the Medal of Honor to Private Samuel E. Eddy, United States Army, for extraordinary heroism on 6 April 1865, while serving with Company D, 37th Massachusetts Infantry, in action at Deatonsville (Sailor's Creek), Virginia. Private Samuel E. Eddy saved the life of the adjutant of his regiment by voluntarily going beyond the line and there killing one of the enemy then in the act of firing upon the wounded officer. Was assailed by several of the enemy, run through the body with a bayonet, and pinned to the ground, but while so situated he shot and killed his assailant.

== See also ==
- List of American Civil War Medal of Honor recipients: A–F
- 37th Massachusetts Volunteer Infantry Regiment
- Battle of Sayler's Creek
- Grand Army of the Republic
