= Bill Eddy =

American statistician

William Eddy is an American author, the John C. Warner Professor of Statistics Emeritus at Carnegie Mellon University and an elected fellow of the American Association for the Advancement of Science, American Statistical Association and Institute of Mathematical Statistics.
