= Ian C. Eddy =

American naval officer (1906–1976)

Ian Crawford Eddy
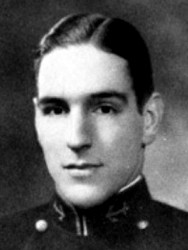
- Born: Ian Augustus Eddy; June 10, 1906; Saratoga Springs, New York, U.S.
- Died: December 30, 1976 (aged 70); New London, Connecticut, U.S.
- Burial place: United States Naval Academy Cemetery
- Education: United States Naval Academy
- Spouse: Emily Wingate Austin
- Military career
- Allegiance: United States
- Branch: United States Navy
- Service years: 1930-1954
- Rank: Rear Admiral
- Commands: USS Pargo (SS-264); USS S-45 (SS-156); Submarine Squadron 3 USS Orion (AS-18)
- Conflicts: World War II
- Awards: Navy Cross; Silver Star; Bronze Star (2)

Ian Crawford Eddy (10 June 1906 – 30 December 1976), was a decorated American submarine commander during World War II who reached the rank of Rear Admiral in the United States Navy.

== Military career ==
=== Naval Academy ===
Ian Crawford Eddy graduated from Annapolis with the class of 1930. He was a Letterwinner in football playing Right Guard on the 1929 "Navy Eleven" team.

=== Promotions ===
Ensign, 9 June 1933

Lieutenant 30 Jun 1938

Lieutenant Commander (T) 15 Jun 1942

Commander (T) 15 Oct 1942

Captain (T) 15 Nov 1945

=== Commands ===
Under Instruction United States Naval Academy 1 Jan 1939

Duty USS S-44 (SS-155) 1 Jul 1939 - 1 Oct 1939

Captain USS S-45 (SS-156) 29 May 1940 - 30 Sep 1942

Captain USS Pargo (SS-264) 26 Apr 1943 - 9 Aug 1944

Flag Lieutenant and Personnel Officer Commander Submarines Atlantic Fleet Sep 1944 - Sep 1945

(Acting?) Chief of Staff Commander Submarines Atlantic Fleet May 1945

Executive Officer, Department of Marine Engineering, United States Naval Academy, 1949

Director of Athletics, United States Naval Academy, 1951-1954
