= Spencer F. Eddy =

American diplomat (1873–1939)

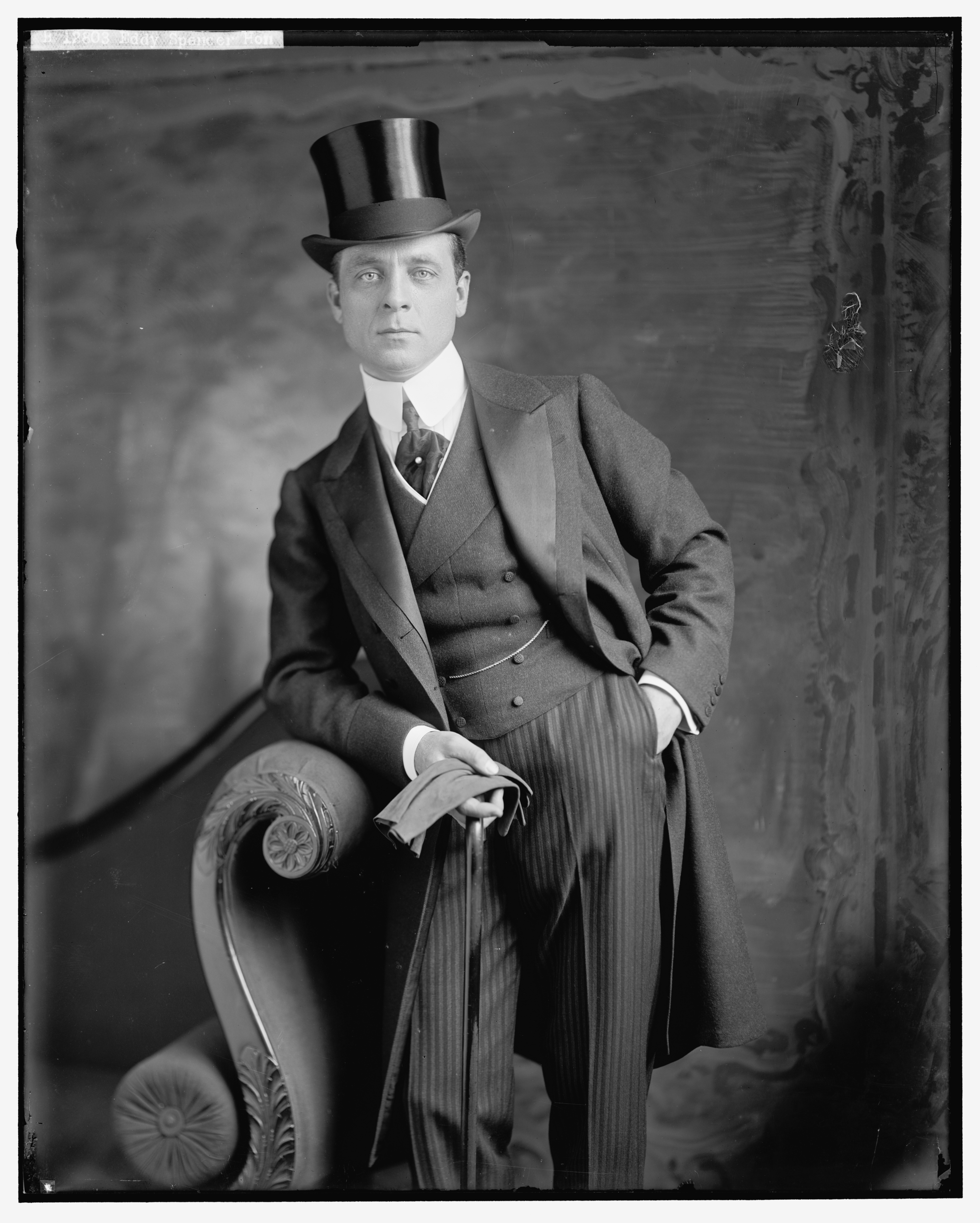

U.S. Minister to Romania
- In office July 9, 1909 – September 29, 1909
- President: William Howard Taft
- Preceded by: Horace G. Knowles
- Succeeded by: John R. Carter

18th United States Minister to Argentina
- In office August 27, 1908 – January 2, 1909
- President: William Howard Taft
- Preceded by: Arthur M. Beaupre
- Succeeded by: Charles H. Sherrill

Personal details
- Born: Spencer Fayette Eddy; June 18, 1873 Chicago, Illinois, U.S.
- Died: October 7, 1939 (aged 66) Savoy-Plaza Hotel, New York City, U.S.
- Resting place: Graceland Cemetery
- Spouse(s): Lurline Spreckels (m. 1906; div. 1923) Viola Cross (m. 1932)
- Relations: Catherine Eddy Beveridge (sister); Thomas Mears Eddy (grandfather)
- Children: Spencer F. Eddy Jr.
- Education: St. Paul's School; University of Berlin; University of Heidelberg
- Alma mater: Harvard University

Spencer Fayette Eddy (June 18, 1873 – October 7, 1939) was an American diplomat who served as U.S. Minister to Argentina and Romania.

== Early life ==
Eddy was born in Chicago, Illinois, on June 18, 1873. He was a son of Augustus Newlands Eddy (1846–1921) and Abby Louisa (née Spencer) Eddy. His sister was Catherine Eddy, the wife of U.S. Senator from Indiana Albert J. Beveridge. His father made his fortune as a businessman and his mother was a member of a family who ran a successful hardware business.

His paternal grandparents were the Rev. Thomas Mears Eddy and Anna (née White) Eddy. His maternal grandparents were Rachel (née Macomber) Spencer and Franklin Fayette Spencer, a founder of Hibbard, Spencer, Bartlett & Co.

After preparing at St. Paul's School in New Hampshire, Eddy graduated from Harvard University in 1896 followed by a year of study at the Universities of Berlin and Heidelberg.

== Career ==
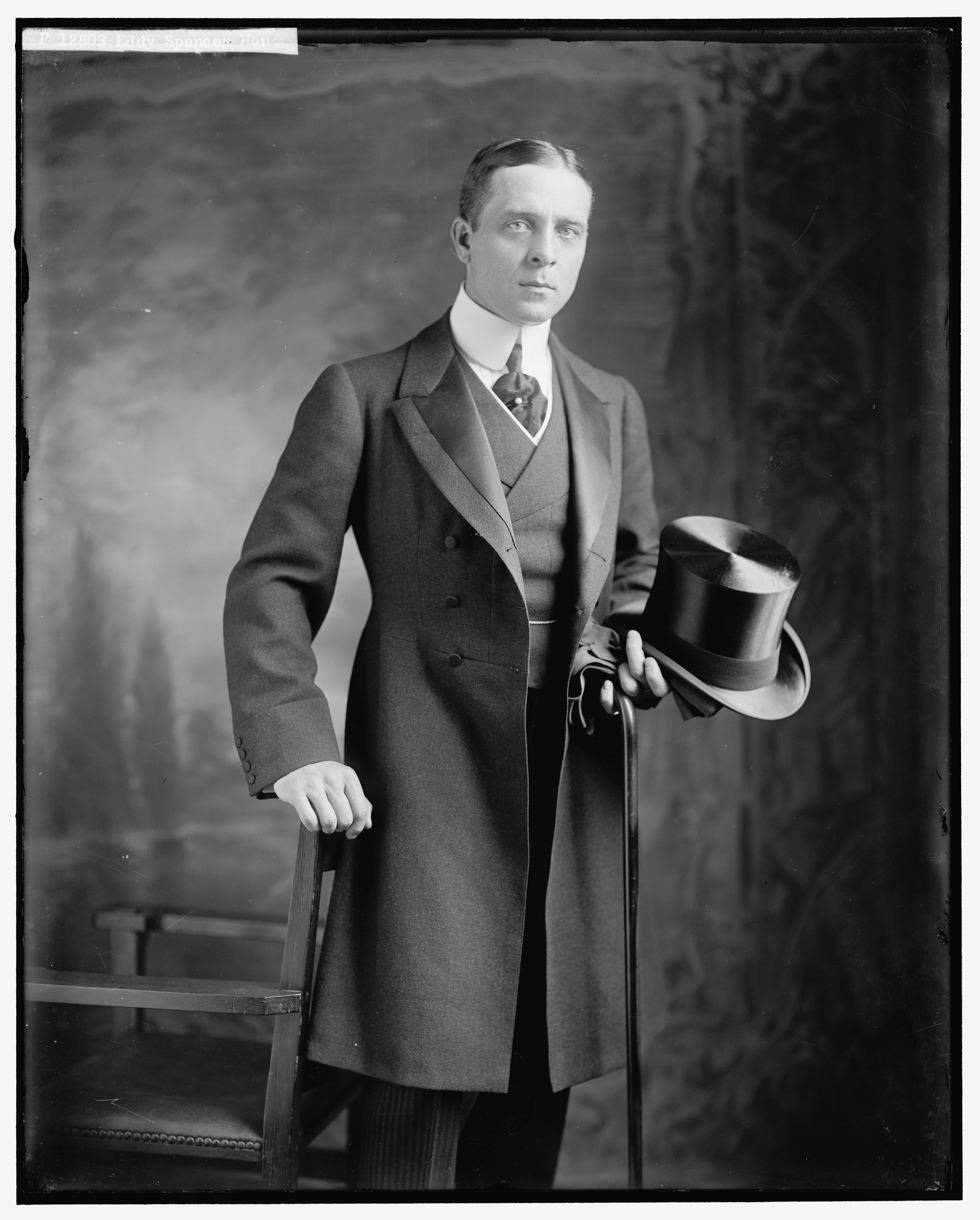
Photograph of Eddy from the Harris & Ewing Collection at the Library of Congress

From 1897 to 1898, he served as the private secretary to U.S. Ambassador to the United Kingdom John Hay before Hay was appointed the U.S. Secretary of State by President William McKinley. He then served as a clerk in the Department of State from 1898 to 1899.

Beginning in late 1899, he served as third secretary in the American Embassy in London followed by the second secretary in the American Embassy in Paris from 1899 to 1901. He was the first secretary and chargé d'affaires in the American Legation in Constantinople from 1901 to 1903, first secretary in the American Embassy in Saint Petersburg from 1903 to 1906, and one year there as chargé d'affaires. From 1906 to 1907, he was first secretary in the American Embassy in Berlin.

=== U.S. Minister ===
On April 2, 1908, President Theodore Roosevelt appointed Eddy U.S. Minister to Argentina. At the time, "European diplomats consider Buenos Ayres the livest political centre in South America, particularly from the American point of view, and they regard Mr. Eddy's designation for the mission as a distinct and well-deserved compliment." He presented his credentials on August 27, 1908, and served until January 2, 1909, when he left his post. In August 1908, Eddy informed the Department of State, "of the vote by the Chamber of Deputies of a credit of $55,000,000 for additional armaments in view of the alleged hostile intentions of Brazil." Nine days after he left his post in Argentina, he was appointed Minister to Romania and Serbia and Diplomatic Agent to Bulgaria on January 11, 1909. He presented his credentials in Romania on July 9, 1909, as a resident at Bucharest, but did not present credentials in Serbia or Bulgaria.

After fifteen years in the diplomatic service, he resigned due to his wife's ill health and left his post on September 29, 1909.

== Personal life ==
On April 26, 1906, Eddy was married to Lurline Elizabeth Spreckels (1886–1969) in Paris while he was an attaché at the American embassy in Saint Petersburg. She was a daughter of Claus August Spreckels and Susan Oroville (née Dore) Spreckels. Her grandfather was industrialist Claus Spreckels and among her extended family was uncles John D. Spreckels and Adolph B. Spreckels. Before their divorce in 1923, they were the parents of:

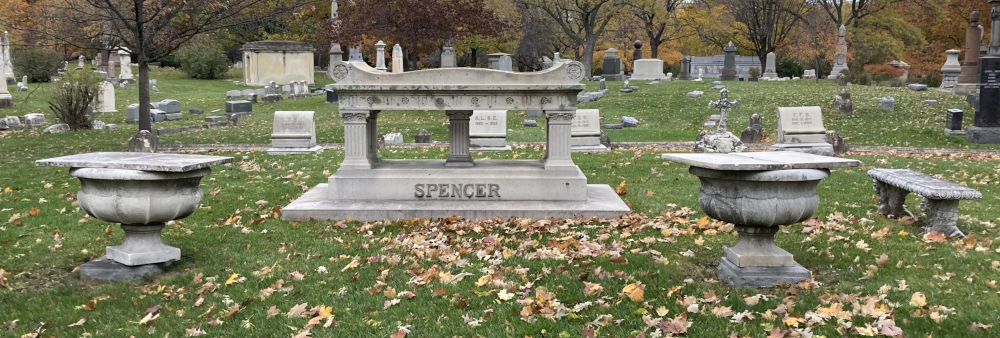
Eddy's grave at Graceland Cemetery

- Spencer Fayette Eddy Jr. (b. 1907), who married Mary Livingston, a daughter of Gerald Moncrieffe Livingston, in 1935. They divorced and she remarried to Dr. Sidney Dillon Ripley II.

In 1932, he married Viola Cross, who reportedly did not get along with his sister.

Eddy died on October 7, 1939, at his apartment in the Savoy-Plaza Hotel in New York City. He was buried at Graceland Cemetery in Chicago.

Diplomatic posts
Preceded by Arthur M. Beaupre	United States Ambassador to Argentina; 1908–1909	Succeeded by Charles H. Sherrill
Preceded by Horace G. Knowles	United States Ambassador to Romania; 1909–1909	Succeeded by John Ridgely Carter
