= Thomas Mears Eddy =

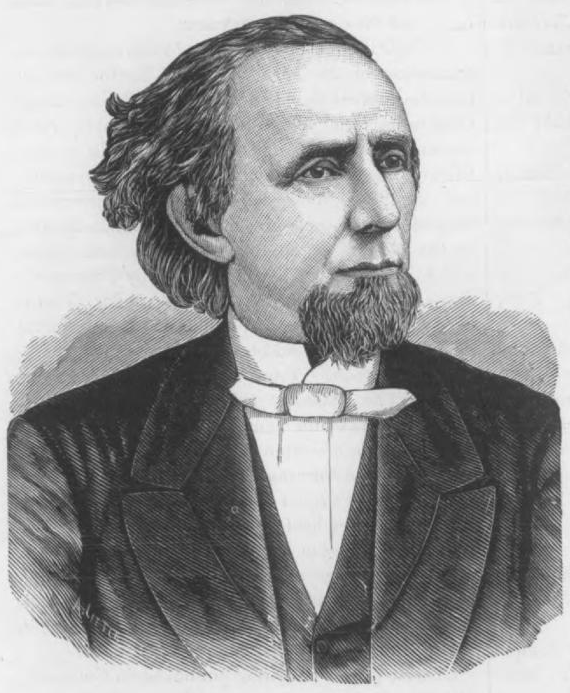
- Born: September 7, 1823; Hamilton County, Ohio, US
- Died: October 7, 1874 (aged 51); New York City, US
- Burial place: Graceland Cemetery
- Occupation(s): Clergyman, writer
- Spouse: Anna White (m. 1845)
- Children: 4

Thomas Mears Eddy (September 7, 1823 – October 7, 1874) was an American clergyman and author.

== Early life ==
Eddy was born in Hamilton County, Ohio, on September 7, 1823. He was the third child, in a family of eight, born to Martha (née Thomas) Eddy (1800–1894) and the Rev. Augustus Eddy (1798–1870).

He was educated at a classical school in Greensboro, Indiana.

== Career ==
From 1842 to 1853, was a Methodist circuit preacher in that State, becoming Agent of the American Bible Society the latter years, and Presiding Elder of the Indianapolis district until 1856, when he was appointed editor of The Northwestern Christian Advocate in Chicago, retiring from that position in 1868.

Later, he held pastorates in Baltimore and Washington and was chosen on the Corresponding Secretaries of the Missionary Society by the General Conference of 1872. Eddy was a copious writer for the press, and besides occasional sermons, published two volumes of reminiscences and personal sketches of prominent Illinoisans in the War of the Rebellion under the title of Patriotism of Illinois (1865). He died in New York City.

== Personal life ==
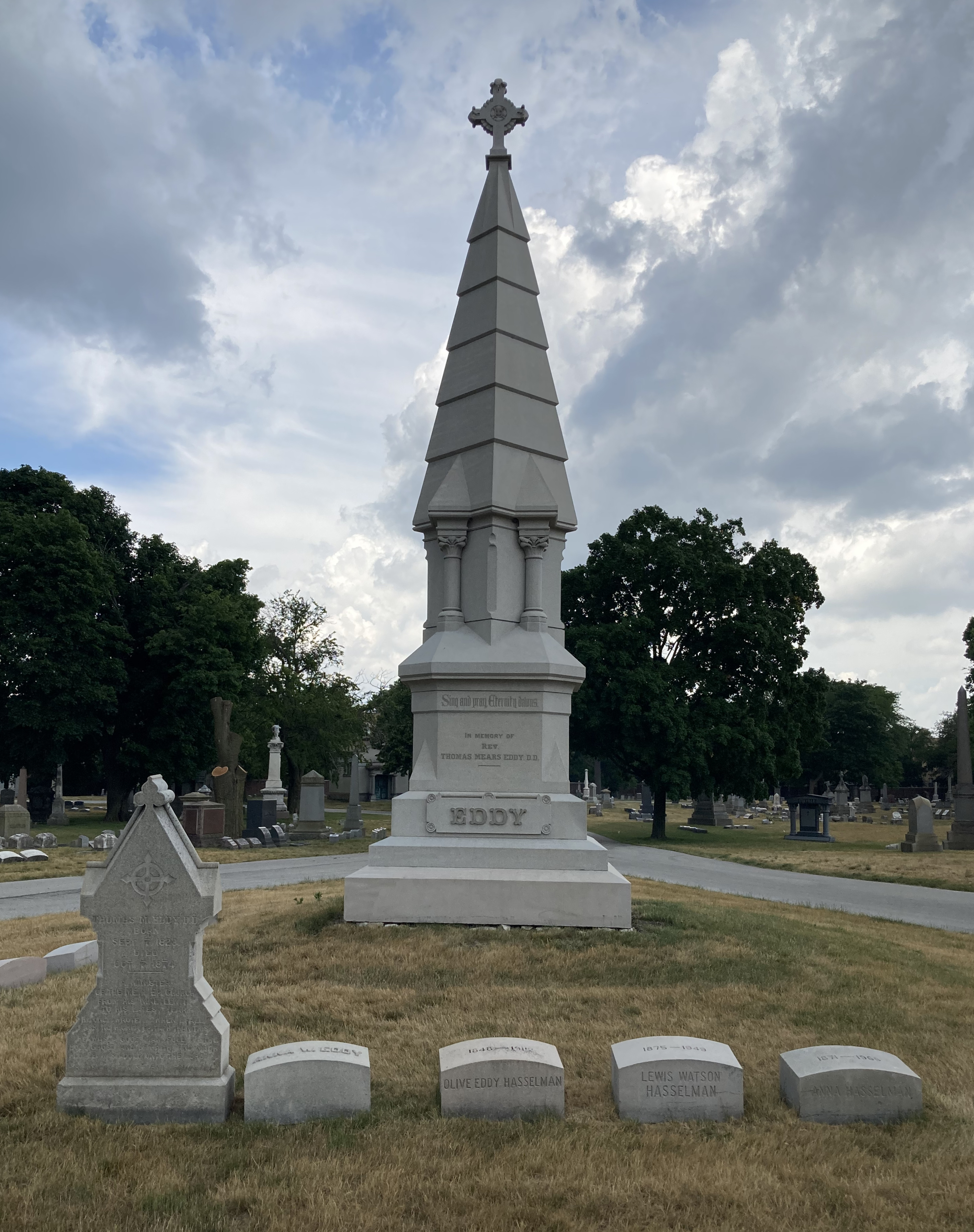
Eddy's grave at Graceland Cemetery

In 1845, Eddy was married to Anna White (1823–1904). Together, they were the parents of:

- Augustus Newlands Eddy (1846–1921), who married Abby Louisa Spencer, a daughter of Franklin Fayette Spencer, founder of Hibbard, Spencer, Bartlett & Co.
- Olive Meta Eddy (1848–1915), who married Otto Harley Hasselman.
- Mary Elizabeth "Lida" Eddy (1851–1921), who married Lewis Cass Tallmadge.
- Thomas Raymond Ames Eddy (b. 1856)

Eddy died on October 7, 1874, in New York City. His funeral was held at St. Paul's Church and was conducted by Bishop Janes and the Rev. Dr. Schaff. He was buried at Graceland Cemetery in Chicago.

=== Family and descendants ===
In 1875, just a year after his death, his sister Elizabeth J. Somers founded the Mount Vernon Seminary and College in Washington, D.C., named after the Mount Vernon Place Methodist Church, which Eddy helped found.

Through his son Augustus, he was a grandfather of Catherine Eddy Beveridge (the wife of U.S. Senator from Indiana Albert J. Beveridge), and diplomat Spencer F. Eddy, who served as U.S. Minister to Argentina and Romania.

Through his daughter Mary, he was a grandfather of Massachusetts Institute of Technology trained architect Thomas Eddy Tallmadge, best known for his Prairie School works.
