= Barry Eddy =

Australian rules footballer

Personal information
- Full name: Barry Charles Eddy
- Born: 9 January 1952 (age 74)
- Original team: Geelong West

Playing career^{1}
Years	Club	Games (Goals)
1974 — 1975	Geelong	14 (0)
- ^{1} Playing statistics correct to the end of 1975.

Barry Charles Eddy (born 9 January 1952) is a former Australian rules footballer who played for Geelong in the Victorian Football League (now known as the Australian Football League).
