= Allison Eddy =

Canadian nephrologist

Academic background
- Education: BSc, 1973, McMaster University; MD, 1975, McMaster University Medical School

Academic work
- Institutions: British Columbia Children's Hospital; University of British Columbia; Seattle Children's; University of Washington; University of Toronto

Allison Audrey Eddy CM is a Canadian nephrologist from Ottawa. She was the inaugural Hudson Family Hospital Chair in Pediatric Medicine at British Columbia Children's Hospital and a clinician-scientist at the British Columbia Children's Hospital.

== Early life and education ==
Eddy completed her Bachelor of Science degree at McMaster University and remained at the institution for her medical degree at McMaster University Medical School. Following her medical degree, Eddy completed a residency in pediatrics at Montreal Children's Hospital and a fellowship in pediatric nephrology at the University of Minnesota.

== Career ==
Upon completing her residency and fellowship, Eddy became a member of the faculty at the University of Toronto and a nephrologist at SickKids. In 1997, she was recruited to become a Professor of Pediatrics at the University of Washington and Head of the Division of Pediatric Nephrology at Seattle Children's. From 2001 to 2007, Eddy served as the Deputy Editor of the Journal of the American Society of Nephrology and as an Associate Editor for the journal Pediatric Nephrology. Following her tenure as Deputy Editor, Eddy was appointed to the rank of Dr. Robert O. Hickman Endowed Chair In Pediatric Nephrology. That same year, she was also appointed the first Director of the Tissue and Cell Sciences Research Center at Seattle Children's Research Institute. As a result of her research and academic success, Eddy was appointed to serve on the Kidney Research Institute's Scientific Advisory Committee.

In 2012, Eddy returned to Canada to serve as the Chief of Pediatrics at British Columbia Children's Hospital (BC Children's) and Head of the Department of Pediatrics at the University of British Columbia. While serving in these roles, Eddy was also appointed BC Children's inaugural Hudson Family Hospital Chair in Pediatric Medicine in 2016. In this new position, Eddy launched a junior faculty two-year mentored scholarship program in health-care quality improvement and developed a research graduate program in Women and Children's Health Sciences. In 2019, Eddy was nominated for a YWCA Women of Distinction Award. During the COVID-19 pandemic, Eddy was elected a Fellow of the Canadian Academy of Health Sciences. Her research and knowledge in the connection between inflammation and kidney scarring. She later retired in 2021.
