= Donald E. deKieffer =

American lawyer (1945–2011)

Donald Eulette deKieffer
- Born: November 8, 1945; Newport, Rhode Island, U.S.
- Died: February 18, 2011 (aged 65); Boulder, Colorado, U.S.
- Education: University of Colorado Boulder; Georgetown University Law Center
- Occupations: Lawyer, lobbyist
- Spouse: Nancy Kishida
- Children: 1 son

Donald Eulette deKieffer (November 8, 1945 – February 18, 2011) was an American lawyer. He was the co-founder of deKieffer & Horgan, a Washington, D.C.–based international law firm, and the president of EDDI Inc., an anticounterfeiting and antidiversion company. In the 1970s, he acted as a lobbyist for the South African apartheid regime. He was the author of two books.

== Early life ==
Donald E. deKieffer was born on November 8, 1945, in Newport, Rhode Island.

DeKieffer was educated at Fairview High School in Boulder, Colorado. He graduated from the University of Colorado Boulder in 1968, and he earned a J.D. degree from the Georgetown University Law Center in 1971.

== Career ==
DeKieffer began his career as a speechwriter for the Senate Republican Policy Committee, where he worked from 1968 to 1971. He also worked as an agent for the Federal Bureau of Investigation (FBI). He was general counsel for the Office of the United States Trade Representative from 1981 to 1983.

DeKieffer was a partner at the law firms of Collier, Shannon, Rill and Scott, and Pillsbury, Madison and Sutro. As a lawyer for Collier, Shannon, Rill and Scott, deKieffer became a lobbyist for the apartheid regime of South Africa. For example, he met with members of the U.S. House and Senate after contributing to their campaigns, invited American businessmen on trips to South Africa, and hired Lester Kinsolving to offer an alternative viewpoint to the Anti-Apartheid Movement at shareholders meetings.

In 1993, deKieffer co-founded deKieffer & Horgan, a Washington, D.C.–based law firm whose focus was international trade. From 2004 to 2011, he was the president of EDDI Inc., "a Washington-based company that maintains databases relating to product counterfeiters and diverters."

DeKieffer was the author of two books.

== Personal life and death ==
DeKieffer married Nancy Kishida, a Japanese national. They had a son, and they resided in McLean, Virginia. He was "a devout Anglican Catholic."

DeKieffer died of a heart attack on February 18, 2011, in Boulder, Colorado.

== Selected works ==
- deKieffer, Donald E. (1995). How Lawyers Screw Their Clients and What You Can Do About It. New York: Barricade Books. ISBN 9781569800553. OCLC 911337024.
- deKieffer, Donald E. (1997). The Citizen's Guide to Lobbying Congress. Chicago: Chicago Review Press. ISBN 9781556521942. OCLC 659907259.
