= Robert I. Ingalls Sr. =

American businessman and philanthropist (1882-1951)

- Born: Robert Ingersoll Ingalls; October 27, 1882; Huntsville, Ohio, U.S.
- Died: July 12, 1951 (aged 68); Birmingham, Alabama, U.S.
- Education: Ohio Normal University
- Occupations: Businessman, philanthropist
- Spouse: Ellen Ely Gregg (m. 1909)
- Children: Robert Jr.
- Relatives: Barbara Ingalls Shook (granddaughter)

Robert Ingersoll Ingalls Sr. (October 27, 1882 – July 12, 1951) was an American businessman and philanthropist.

== Early life ==
Ingalls was born in Huntsville, Ohio, on October 27, 1882, the son of Flora (née Bimel) and Horace Putnam Ingalls. He attended Ohio Normal (now Ohio Northern) University. He married the former Ellen Ely Gregg on April 14, 1909.

== Career ==
He founded Ingalls Iron Works in Titusville, Birmingham, Alabama, in 1910. He also established Ingalls Shipbuilding in 1938. They became the largest privately owned steel manufacturer in the Southern United States and the largest shipyard in the Gulf Coast of the United States. In 1937, he started a shipyard in Decatur, Alabama. To accommodate the growing needs of the Second World War, it was moved to Birmingham, Alabama, then to Chickasaw, Alabama, and finally in Pascagoula, Mississippi. By the time of his death, his company was worth US$40 million.

== Philanthropy ==
He established the Ingalls Foundation in 1943. Among other causes, since 1965, it has funded the Ellen Gregg Ingalls Award for Excellence in Classroom Teaching at Vanderbilt University in Nashville, Tennessee.

== Death and family ==
He died on July 12, 1951, in Birmingham.

His son Robert Ingersoll Ingalls Jr. (1906–1968) inherited 90% of the company. He sold Ingalls Industries to Litton Industries in 1961, which was ultimately purchased by Northrop Grumman in 2001. He was also a yachtsman, who owned the yacht Rhonda III.

His granddaughter, Barbara Ingalls Shook (1939-2008), was a philanthropist at the helm of the Ingalls Foundation.

== Legacy ==
The Robert I. Ingalls Sr. Hall on the campus of Samford University in Homewood, Alabama, is named in his honor. It was built in 1957, and it is home to the McWhorter School of Pharmacy.
