= T. V. Eddy =

American politician (1853–1918)

Member of the Washington House of Representatives for the 44th district
- In office 1895–1897

Personal details
- Born: October 25, 1853 McHenry County, Illinois, United States
- Died: 1918 (aged 64–65)
- Party: Republican

Thomas Valentine Eddy (October 25, 1853 – 1918) was an American politician in the state of Washington. He served in the Washington House of Representatives from 1895 to 1897.
