= Mount Vernon Seminary and College =

Private women's college in Washington, D.C. (1875–1997)

- Active: 1875–1997
- Location: Washington D.C, United States

The Mount Vernon Seminary and College was a private women's college in Washington, D.C. It was purchased by George Washington University in 1999, and became the Mount Vernon Campus of The George Washington University.

== Founding of Mount Vernon Seminary and 204 F Street, NW ==
Mount Vernon College was founded in 1875, but its roots trace back to 1868, when Elizabeth J. Somers began tutoring the young daughters of prominent Washington men in her house at 204 F Street, NW in Washington, D.C. At the time, there were no schools for the education of girls in Washington, D.C. Her first three students were the daughters of Judge Dennis Cooley—Clara, Minnie and Mary. Their father, Judge Cooley, approached Mrs. Somers and asked her to teach his daughters in preparation for their attendance at Vassar College. When Mrs. Somers began teaching the Cooley girls, she began receiving similar requests to teach other children. Her small school grew.

Seven years later, in 1875, Elizabeth Somers officially opened Mount Vernon Seminary, a day school for young ladies, that offered a six-year course of instruction, including four high school and two post high school, college years. The school was named after Mount Vernon Place Methodist Church in Baltimore, which was founded by Somers' brother, Thomas Eddy. The school included in its students the daughters of prominent men in Washington, including senators and congressmen. The school and students took full advantage of their Washington, D.C. location to further their education. Students reportedly visited the Volta Place laboratory of Alexander Graham Bell, to test the newly invented telephone. Bell's daughters, Elsie Bell Grosvenor (class of 1897) and Marian Bell Fairchild (class of 1895) all attended Mount Vernon Seminary, as well as several of his granddaughters and nieces.

== 1100 M Street, NW: 1880–1917 ==
The enrollment at the Seminary increased and within five years, the school had outgrown its F Street location. Mrs. Somers moved the school to a new location at 1100 M Street, NW. The school remained on M Street for 37 years.

During those years, the school underwent a period of tremendous expansion. By 1882, Mrs. Somers had purchased three additional houses next to the original location. She built an enclosed courtyard to serve as a recess area, and a tennis and basketball court. Between 1890 and 1917, the student body counted more than 100 boarding students and 50 day students. By that time, the school had built a supportive alumnae base that returned to the school for alumnae events and reunions. The group became organized as the Mount Vernon Alumnae Association in 1885, and has been in existence continuously since.

During this period, beginning in 1893, the final two years of the school were referred to as "the collegiate course", designed to prepare young women for entrance into four year colleges. By 1905, Mount Vernon Seminary graduates were being accepted into leading four year women's colleges. The school boasted a rigorous academic curriculum. In order to graduate, Seminary students had to complete the formal process of 'Senior Essays', in which they completed primary research and wrote on a current political or social topic. These essays were read at Commencement exercises and awards were granted for the best essays. Some of the topics included controversial subjects of the time such as women's suffrage, child labor, the effects of poverty on children, and prohibition.

During this time, students came from all across the United States to attend Mount Vernon, as well as Hawaii, Japan, and Syria. In 1915, Mrs. Somers announced her retirement and Adelia Gates Hensley, a Mount Holyoke College graduate, became the second president of Mount Vernon Seminary. The school was outgrowing its M Street location and its enrollment continued to increase.

== Nebraska Avenue Campus, 1917–1942 ==
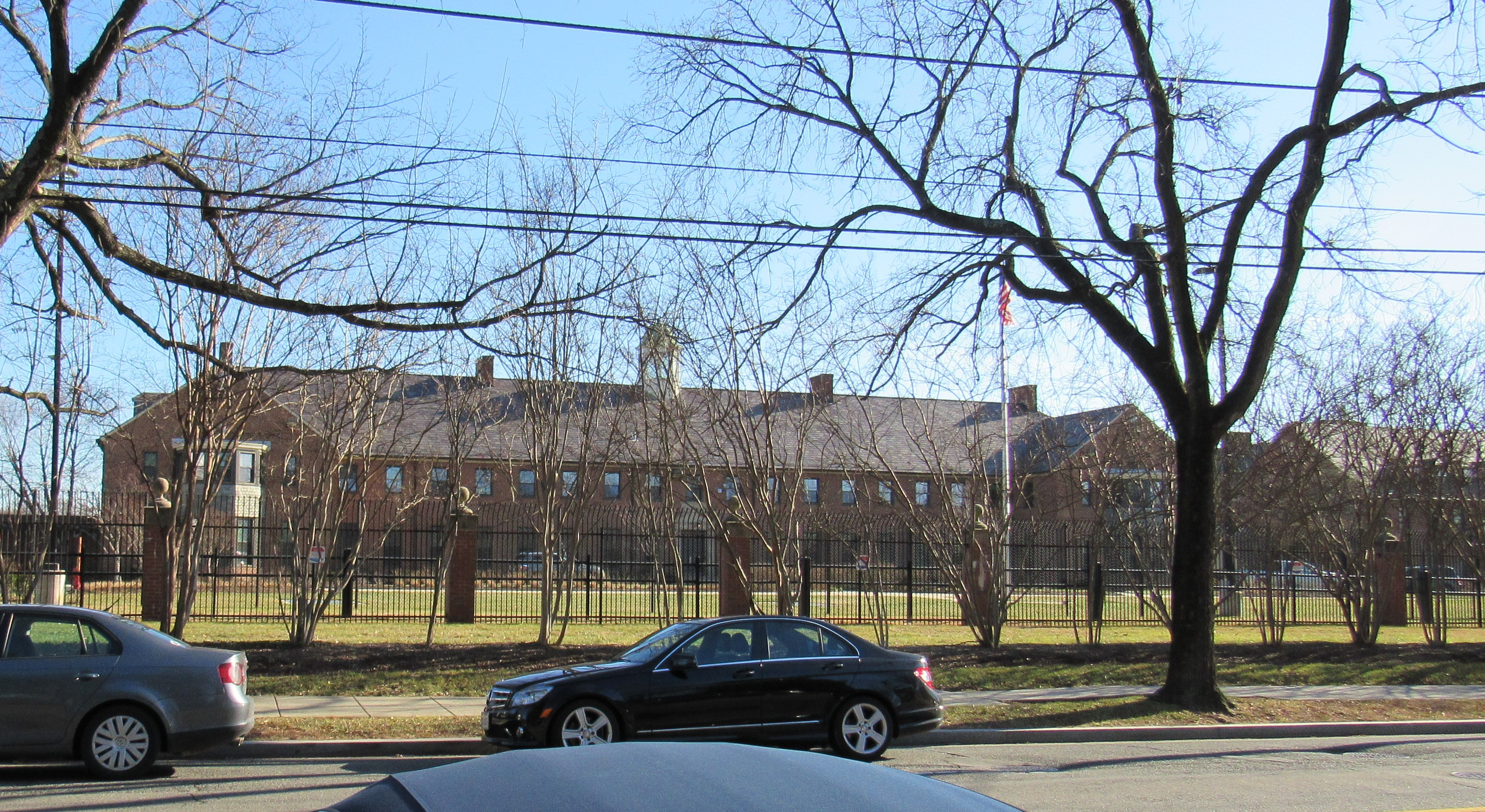
The former Nebraska Avenue campus pictured in 2016

In 1917, the school moved to a 15-acre (61,000 m^{2}) campus located on Nebraska Avenue. Mrs. Somers, although retired, remained active in the operation of the school. She sold her M Street property to the YWCA, in keeping with her dedication to educating girls and young women. World War I forced students to quickly become involved in war efforts such as organizing First Aid classes and rolling bandages for wounded soldiers. The Seminary was assigned a ward at Walter Reed Hospital and students made care packages for hospitalized soldiers.

Of the 20 graduates in the class of 1920, eight continued their education at four year colleges including University of Wisconsin, Northwestern University, University of Montana, Stanford University, and University of Texas. This was not common practice for women at the time, and testified to the solid education they received while at the Seminary. By 1923, graduates were attending University of California at Berkeley, Columbia University, Stanford University, Cornell University, Smith College, Wellesley College and The University of Chicago.

In 1923, Adelia Gates Hensley died, and one year later, Elizabeth Somers. Although Mrs. Somers was the founder of the school, Mrs. Hensley had seen the school through a period of tremendous growth, and is credited with substantially improving the faculty. She was replaced by Jean Dean Cole, a former Seminary student and Mount Holyoke College graduate. Under her leadership, the school established a Junior College as a separate unit. Mount Vernon Seminary and Junior College operated together, but with a clear distinction between the two—the four year preparatory school and the two year junior college section. Until that time, students had to study for a complete six years before receiving a diploma.

In 1936, Jean Dean Cole resigned. Mr. George Lloyd became the fourth president of the college and his wife, Mrs. Olwen Lloyd became Headmistress in 1938. During World War II, volunteer war work became a part of life at Mount Vernon, with students participating in air raid drills, nurses' aid training, and Red Cross work. In 1942, the United States Navy informed Mr. and Mrs. Lloyd that they planned to take over the Nebraska Avenue campus and use its facilities for the war effort; to be called the Naval Communications Annex for intelligence work. Students went home for Christmas break not knowing if their school would re-open after the holidays. The board of trustees began searching for a new location for the school.

The Nebraska Avenue campus was listed on the National Register of Historic Places in 2016.

== Spring Valley, 1943–1946 ==
In early 1943, the campus was relocated to the top floor of a Garfinckel's department store building in the Spring Valley neighborhood of Washington, D.C. All but nine students returned to the school which re-opened on February 1, 1943; This was a spread out campus located in the store and different homes that were purchased in the neighbourhood; 162 students had to be boarded out. While in Spring Valley, the school began examining its programs and realized that it was operating essentially two different schools, the Seminary and the junior college. This placed the school under a severe financial and administrative drain. The school considered closing one arm of the school but tabled the idea at the time. The school applied for accreditation and began awarding the Associates of Arts degree in 1944 to junior college graduates.

== Foxhall Road 1946–1999 ==
In 1944, Mount Vernon was granted compensation of $1.038 million from the United States Navy for the military takeover of its property. Originally $800,000 had been offered, a fraction of what the buildings and grounds were worth.

The school then purchased 21 acres (85,000 m^{2}) of property for a new campus located on Foxhall Road in Washington, D.C. An academic building, four dormitories and a dining room were built, and other buildings gradually added. During the 1960s, the junior college developed new majors in an effort to place emphasis on those subjects which fit well with the capital city, such as those in government and politics, international relations and fine arts. The interior design program in the Junior College was also enhanced; the school phased out its vocational programs such as home economics and secretarial studies to develop its higher education curriculum. During the same period, the Seminary remained one of the most academically rigorous private secondary institutions in the nation and drew record numbers of students from around the country, graduating the largest classes in the Seminary's history. However, deciding that it was financially impossible to run two separate institutions, the board of trustees chose in 1965 to close its historic, respected Seminary to build up its collegiate program. The last Seminary class was graduated in 1969.

The school was then officially renamed Mount Vernon Junior College. Mount Vernon was dedicated to remaining a women's college but faced significant financial struggles due to declining enrollments; the opening of previously all-male institutions to coeducation negatively impacted Mount Vernon and all women's institutions during that era. By 1973, in order to meet the contemporary needs of women, the school began awarding the Bachelor of Arts degree, first in Public Affairs and Government followed by Business Administration, Childhood and Special Education and the Visual Arts. In a move to seek additional revenue, the college began a continuing education program. In 1976, Mount Vernon College became an accredited four year college.

== Recent history, 1999–present ==
In 1997, the board of trustees decided that the college would close as an independent institution. As of June 30, 1999, Mount Vernon became affiliated with The George Washington University (GW). The school is now known as The George Washington University – Mount Vernon Campus. The Elizabeth J. Somers Women's Leadership Program was founded in honor of the Mount Vernon Seminary and College and its alumnae. Once Mount Vernon was purchased by GW, it became co-ed, and students of both genders were welcomed on campus for classes, and social and athletic events, but only women lived on campus through Spring 2001. After the college's first two years as part of GW, students also began living on the Mount Vernon campus, however, the Mount Vernon campus continued to offer some housing and programs specifically for women, in honor of the college's origins. GW constructed new athletic fields, dormitories, and other facilities to support the growth of the Mount Vernon campus. There is a free shuttle available to travel between the Mount Vernon and Foggy Bottom campuses of GW.

== Notable alumnae ==
See also Category:Mount Vernon Seminary and College alumni

- Khadija al-Salami, first Yemeni female film producer
- Barbara Allen, former Kansas State Senator
- Nazenin Ansari, Managing Editor of Kayhan London, Trustee of the Foreign Press Association in London, Member of the Board of Directors Encyclopædia Iranica
- Audrey Jones Beck, philanthropist, Houston, TX
- Susan Elizabeth Ford, daughter of late President Gerald Ford, author, chairman of the board of Betty Ford Center.
- Marjorie Merriweather Post, socialite and owner of Post Foods. Post Hall and Merriweather Hall are named in her honor.
- Charlsie Cantey, horse racing sportscaster
- Courteney Cox, actor (dropped out after first year)
- Ada Comstock, first president of Radcliffe College
- Frances Dodge, internationally known horsewoman and motor company heiress
- Eleanor Lansing Dulles, PhD Harvard University, U.S. State Department, educator.
- Dorothy Fratt, painter.
- Anne Hearst, socialite and publishing heiress
- Philippa Malmgren, former National Economic Council member
- Evalyn Walsh McLean, heiress to mining fortune, socialite
- Heather Nauert, Under Secretary of State for Public Diplomacy and Public Affairs (Acting) (2018), Spokesperson for the United States Department of State (2017–2019); Fox News Channel news anchor and co-host
- Sally Nevius, ex President of Mt. Vernon College, Co-Founder of the Parents Music Resource Center.
- Barbara Ingalls Shook, heiress and philanthropist.
- Ginni Thomas, conservative activist and wife of Supreme Court Justice Clarence Thomas (transferred to the University of Nebraska–Lincoln after one year)
- Frances Nash Watson, pianist.

== See also ==
- List of current and historical women's universities and colleges

== Citations ==
=== References ===
- Mikhalevsky, Nina (2001). Dear Daughters: A History of Mount Vernon Seminary and College. Washington, DC: Mount Vernon Seminary and College Alumnae Association.
- Budiansky, Stephen (2000). Battle of Wits: The complete story of Codebreaking in World War II. New York: Free Press. pp. 223–225. ISBN 0-684-85932-7.
