= Richard Eddy (politician) =

New Zealand politician (1882–1955)

The Honourable Richard Eddy
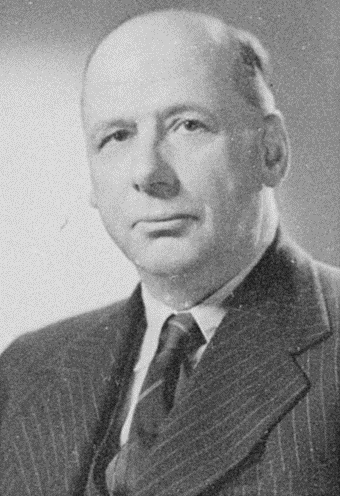

Member of the Legislative Council
- In office 23 June 1941 – 31 December 1950

Personal details
- Born: 4 August 1882 Doyleston, New Zealand
- Died: 21 September 1955 (aged 73) Wellington, New Zealand
- Party: Labour Party

Richard Eddy (4 August 1882 – 21 September 1955) was a New Zealand labourer and trade unionist. He was a member of the New Zealand Legislative Council from 23 June 1941 to 22 June 1948; then 23 June 1948 to 31 December 1950 when the council was abolished. He was appointed by the First Labour Government

He was born in Doyleston, North Canterbury, New Zealand on 4 August 1882. He died aged 73 years.
