= Mary Pierson Eddy =

American Ottoman religious and medical missionary

- Born: September 21, 1864; Sidon, Ottoman Empire
- Died: 1923 (aged 58–59)
- Medical career
- Profession: Ophthalmology

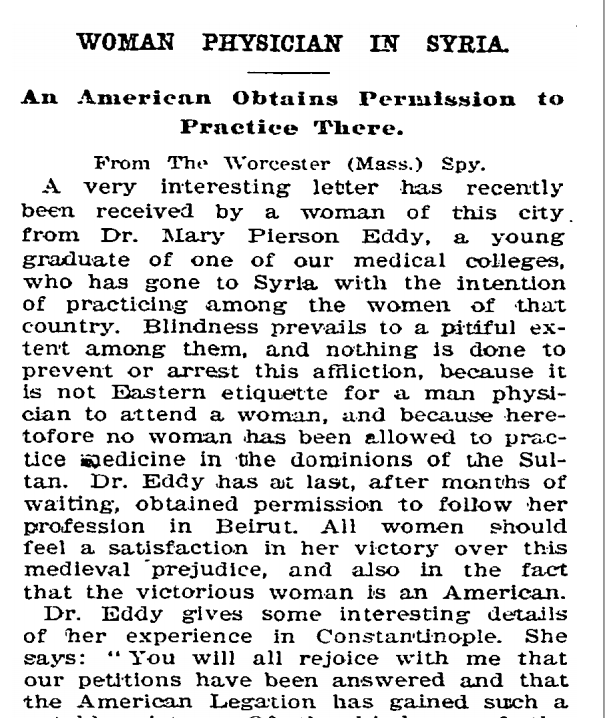
1894 article in the New York Times announcing Dr. Mary Pierson Eddy as the first woman to be licensed to practice medicine by the Ottoman Empire.

Dr. Mary Pierson Eddy (1864-1923) was a religious and medical missionary. She was born in Syria to American missionary parents. Dr. Eddy followed in her parents' footsteps to become a medical missionary in the Middle East. She was the first woman to obtain a license to practice medicine in the Ottoman Empire. Dr. Eddy spent most of her missionary career traveling among remote villages of Syria until her death at age 59.

Her family is credited with the success of the American Board of Commissioners for Foreign Missions in Syria.

== Early life ==
Dr. Mary Eddy was born in Sidon, Lebanon on September 21, 1864, the fourth child out of five of William Woodbridge and Hannah Eddy (née Condit). Mary, along with siblings William and Harriet, followed their parents' examples and became missionaries in the Middle East. The eldest child, William, continued his parents' missionary practice in Sidon until he died in 1906. Harriet, the eldest daughter, also became a missionary. She worked in Sidon before continuing her mission in Beirut. Their sibling Robert is the only child of the Eddys to live in the United States, where he was a physician in New Rochelle, New York. The Eddys also had a fifth child, Ms. Julia Woodbridge Eddy, but little is known about her.

Dr. William W. Eddy was born in Penn Yan, New York on December 18, 1825. He attended Williams College (where he was a member of Delta Upsilon) and graduated in 1845. He died in Beirut on January 26, 1900. Hannah Condit Eddy was from Oswego, New York and attended Mount Holyoke Seminary. She died on April 14, 1904.

In November 1851, William Eddy sailed with his wife to Syria with the American Board missionaries to begin a lifelong missionary career. After arriving in Syria, William and Hannah remained in Syria for 48 years, spending time in Aleppo, but mostly in Beirut and Sidon(present-day Lebanon). During their time in Syria, the Eddys established various seminaries, schools, and churches.

=== Education ===
At 16, Eddy went to the United States for the first time to complete her studies, as is common among missionary families. Eddy attended school in Philadelphia for 2 years before studying at Elmira College in upstate New York. She returned to Syria in 1883 after sustaining an injury due to a fall.

== Missionary work in Syria ==
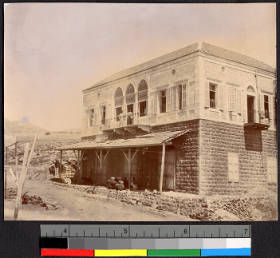
The house Dr. Mary P. Eddy moved to in 1903 upon her return from her third trip to the United States, located in present-day Lebanon

=== Background ===
In 1888, Eddy became seriously ill with burning fever. At just twenty-two years old, friends and family feared for her life until her fever broke. Because of this illness, Mary decided to become a physician. Dr. Eddy subsequently returned to New York in 1890 to study medicine. She completed her studies sometime around 1892 and was appointed as a missionary to Syria by the Presbyterian Board of Foreign Missions.

In 1893, Dr. Eddy left New York and traveled to Istanbul to obtain a medical license from the Ottoman Empire. When questioned by Turkish officials of the Imperial Council about her origins and background, she responded in Arabic, "I am of you and from among you." Officials were stunned and proceeded to examine her medical knowledge for six hours before approving her as a physician of the Ottoman Empire.

=== Work in Syria ===
Dr. Mary Eddy began her missionary work in November 1893. Although she worked under the American Protestant missionaries, Dr. Eddy's main focus was not to proselytize but to heal. She founded eye clinics, hospitals, and a tuberculosis sanatorium. Unlike other missionaries of her time, Dr. Eddy traveled frequently throughout her mission. She set up clinics in tents and reached a great number of patients. In one instance, Dr. Eddy saw more than 500 new patients and performed over 40 eye operations in a single day. Dr. Eddy continued her mission for more than 20 years and faced many unorthodox situations. She contracted malaria, was swept out to sea, almost shipwrecked a trip from Beirut to Syria, and slept in a mud hut among other people and animals, among other hardships.

== Death ==
Stress, exhaustion, and overwork contributed to Dr. Eddy's serious health problems. In 1914, she suffered a stroke and lost her eyesight. From then on, Eddy's health slowly deteriorated. A few years before her death, Dr. Eddy was hospitalized in the United States. In 1916, she wrote, "I don't know what the future has in store. I only wish I had a home on this globe." Eddy's wish was to return to her place of birth before her death. In 1922, and accompanied by her sister Harriet, Eddy returned to the Middle East. Dr. Eddy died, blind and invalid, at age 59.

== Legacy ==
Mary Eddy was born in Syria to religious missionary parents. She was fluent in Arabic and very familiar with the culture of her patients. However, Dr. Eddy was a complex character in that while she desired to serve her patients, she also at times was critical of them. In correspondence with friends, she remarked that the "natives" had a "lack of moral sense" and described them as "Black and uncomely with no redeeming qualities of the mind and body." Despite this, Dr. Eddy genuinely cared for the physical and spiritual wellbeing of her patients, as seen through her commitment to serve despite hardships and personal illness.

Dr. Eddy felt as if she was neither Syrian nor American. The only times Eddy visited the United States was for her schooling and for her health treatments. Although she was more at home in Syria, she still at times held Syrians in contempt. Until her death, Eddy felt as if she had "no home" on Earth. Rather, she felt as if she had a calling to evangelize and heal before reaching her home in heaven.
