= Lucy Daniels (writer, born 1934) =

American writer (born 1934)

- Daniels in 1956
- Born: March 24, 1934 (age 92); Durham, North Carolina, U.S.
- Other name: Lucy Daniels Inman
- Occupation: Writer
- Spouse: Thomas Patrick Inman (m. 1957; div. 1976)
- Children: 4 (including Lucy)
- Father: Jonathan W. Daniels
- Relatives: Josephus Daniels (grandfather)
- Awards: Guggenheim Fellowship (1957)

Academic background
- Education: University of North Carolina at Chapel Hill
- Thesis: The role of personality and family relationship factors in adolescent unwed pregnancy (1976)

Lucy Cathcart Daniels (born March 24, 1934) is an American writer and clinical psychologist. Born to the family behind The News & Observer, she wrote her 1956 debut novel Caleb, My Son while committed to a psychiatric hospital to treat her anorexia nervosa. After releasing a second novel and writing for the family business, she retired to care for her children, before obtaining her PhD in clinical psychology from the University of North Carolina at Chapel Hill. She opened the Lucy Daniels Foundation and Lucy Daniels Center for Early Childhood with money made from the sale of the family business.

In 2002, Daniels returned to writing with her memoir With a Woman's Voice: A Writer's Struggle for Emotional Development. Since then, she has released several more books, including a novel and two short story collections.

== Biography ==
=== Early life and writing career ===
Lucy Daniels was born on March 24, 1934, in Durham, North Carolina. Her father Jonathan W. Daniels was a writer and newspaper editor who served as White House Press Secretary for a few months in 1945, and her mother Lucy Cathcart co-founded The Island Packet. Her paternal grandfather Josephus Daniels was editor for The News & Observer, a position his son later held, as well as Secretary of the Navy. Her younger sister Adelaide Key later became a philanthropist based in Asheville. She was treated for strabismus during childhood. Starting age 15, she published short stories during her youth, with one of them appearing in Seventeen.

As a teenager, Daniels suffered from anorexia nervosa due to a "fear of becoming a woman and dying in childbirth", at one point weighing only about fifty pounds. Feeling ashamed of their daughter's illness, her parents secretly moved her to a different state. She dropped out of high school to get treatment at a psychiatric hospital, where she received force-feeding and shock therapy; she could not accept an invitation to the North Carolina Debutante Ball due to her illness. She wrote Caleb, My Son during her stay at the facility, where she eventually completed it. Daniels told the Salisbury Post that writing the novel helped her deal with her illness. Her debut novel, Caleb, My Son was published in 1956, and she appeared on Today, a few radio talk shows, and a 21 Club luncheon with critics. In 1957, she was awarded a Guggenheim Fellowship for creative fiction; she was the youngest person to win the award. She published her second novel High on a Hill, inspired by years of experience with being committed to psychiatric institutions, in 1961. By March 1962, she had plans for a third novel "which she roughed out just before Christmas".

In 1956, Daniels joined the Raleigh Times as a reporter. She worked at her family business as a radio and television journalist, and wrote several book reviews for the newspaper. Despite being interested in the family business, she was passed over as her father's successor by a male first cousin; Melissa Turner of The Island Packet said that this decision was because "in the South in the 1950s and 1960s, girls didn't succeed their fathers no matter how talented."

=== Retirement from writing and psychologist career ===
Despite her own success as a writer, Daniels was still suffering writer's block she later attributed to "unconscious conflict very similar to the conflict that caused [her] anorexia". She retired from writing to raise her children due to her husband's alcoholism; Daniels recalled that this experience "gave me the courage to go back to college and while there, I thought I'd take the risk of becoming a clinical psychologist. It changed my life". After a few classes at North Carolina State University, she went to the University of North Carolina at Chapel Hill, where she obtained a psychology degree in 1972 and a PhD in clinical psychology in 1977. Her doctoral dissertation was titled The role of personality and family relationship factors in adolescent unwed pregnancy. She also received psychotherapy for the first time, something she had been denied at the time she had anorexia.

In September 1977, Daniels became director of psychological services at Lee Harnett Mental Health Center in Sanford, North Carolina. In 1982, the North Carolina Psychological Association awarded her an Award of Appreciation for her paper on psychotherapy cost-effectiveness. Recalling on her evolution as a psychologist, she cited her experiences as a mother as her reason for being interested in child psychology. She has also maintained a private practice in Raleigh, and at age 79 was still practicing as late as 2014.

In 1989, Daniels and her relatives made $74 million from a sale involving The News & Observer's company. The same year, she used the money to found a non-profit called the Lucy Daniels Foundation and an early education institution called the Lucy Daniels Center for Early Childhood, and in 1992 she began leading an annual seminar named Our Problems as the Roots of Our Power. She received the first Lifetime Achievement Award at the 2014 International Symposium on Psychology and the Arts in Florence, Italy.

=== Return to writing ===
In the 1970s, Daniels became interested in psychoanalysis, a decision she credited with breaking her writer's block. In 2002, she published With a Woman's Voice: A Writer's Struggle for Emotional Development, a memoir which the Salisbury Post called "her most intimate project to date"; this was the first time in four decades that she wrote a book. She self-published the memoir with her own money after failing to find a mainstream publisher willing to publish it in her own way; setting a personal estimate of $150,000, she invested in the book's printing, distribution, and promotion. In 2005, she released The Eyes of the Father, her first novel in four decades, and a self-help book named Dreaming Your Way to Creative Freedom: A Two-Mirror Liberation Process. She also published two short story collections, Walking with Moonshine: My Life in Stories (2013) and Maritime Magistery (2016).

In 2013, Daniels appeared in Elisabeth Haviland James's documentary film In So Many Words.

=== Personal life ===
Daniels married Thomas Patrick Inman, a journalist based in North Carolina, at the Church of the Good Shepherd on July 2, 1957; the couple had four children, including judge Lucy Inman. They divorced in 1976, and Daniels had a second marriage that lasted from before 1989 until around 1991.

As of 2002, Daniels lived in Raleigh. She also lived in Indianapolis while her husband worked as a reporter for the Indianapolis Times. In addition to her children, she also has two dachshund dogs.

== Bibliography ==
=== Novels ===
- Caleb, My Son (1956)
- High on a Hill (1961)
- The Eyes of the Father (2005)

=== Other media ===
- With a Woman's Voice: A Writer’s Struggle for Emotional Freedom (2002)
- Dreaming Your Way to Creative Freedom: A Two-Mirror Liberation Process (2005)
- Walking with Moonshine: My Life in Stories (2013)
- Maritime Magistery (2016)
