= Beth Campbell Short =

American journalist (1908–1988)

Correspondence Secretary to the President
- In office September 1952 – January 1953
- President: Harry Truman
- Preceded by: William D. Hassett
- Succeeded by: Ann C. Whitman (as Personal Secretary)

Personal details
- Born: Beth Campbell; August 6, 1908 Alluwe, Oklahoma, U.S.
- Died: January 11, 1988 (aged 79) Alexandria, Virginia, U.S.
- Spouse: Joseph Short (m. 1937; died 1952)
- Education: University of Oklahoma

Beth Campbell Short (August 6, 1908 – January 11, 1988) was an American journalist. She was a reporter for the Springfield Leader and The Daily Oklahoman, before joining the Associated Press as a correspondent in its Washington, D.C. bureau. While there, she covered the First Lady, Eleanor Roosevelt, and met her future husband, Joseph Short, a fellow reporter at the paper and later press secretary for President Harry S. Truman. She was appointed as Truman's correspondence secretary in 1952, a position she held until 1953 when the presidential administration changed. She was the publicity director for the Democratic Senatorial Campaign Committee and press secretary for Senator Mike Monroney.

== Early life ==
Campbell was born on August 6, 1908, in Alluwe, Oklahoma. Her parents were Thomas and Iris Campbell and her brother was Jackson J. Campbell. She studied at Christian College between 1925 and 1926 in Columbia, Missouri, before graduating in 1929 from the University of Oklahoma with a bachelor's degree and certificate in journalism, where she was involved with the college newspaper.

== Career ==
On the advice of the journalist Sigrid Arne, she took a job with the Springfield Leader in Springfield, Missouri, starting work three days after her graduation. She worked 70 to 80 hours a week as a general reporter, earning $25 (equivalent to $469 in 2025) a week. She wrote on a range of topics in her column, titled 'The Very Idea' – including a report on the Young Brothers massacre in 1932, a series on her efforts to live on $2.50 (equivalent to $48 in 2025) for ten days and a criticism of the sermons delivered by local pastors. In 1930, when she published the latter article, she was challenged to deliver her own sermon before a thousand congregants at First Congregational Church, which she titled 'Rejoice in Thy Youth'. For her wide range of topics, she was nicknamed as a "stunt girl reporter".

In 1934, as her mother was dying, Campbell resigned from the paper to move back to Oklahoma City, Oklahoma. She became a reporter at The Daily Oklahoman. Although there were fewer women at the paper, she was respected by her colleagues and sent to Washington, D.C. as a correspondent for the Associated Press (AP) in 1936. She covered the First Lady, Eleanor Roosevelt, who had a policy of requiring her news conferences to only be covered by female reporters. Campbell later credited this policy with giving her and her colleague Ruth Cowan their break. She was the only woman at the Washington bureau for the AP, out of eighty-nine staff members, taking over for Bess Furman in the position.

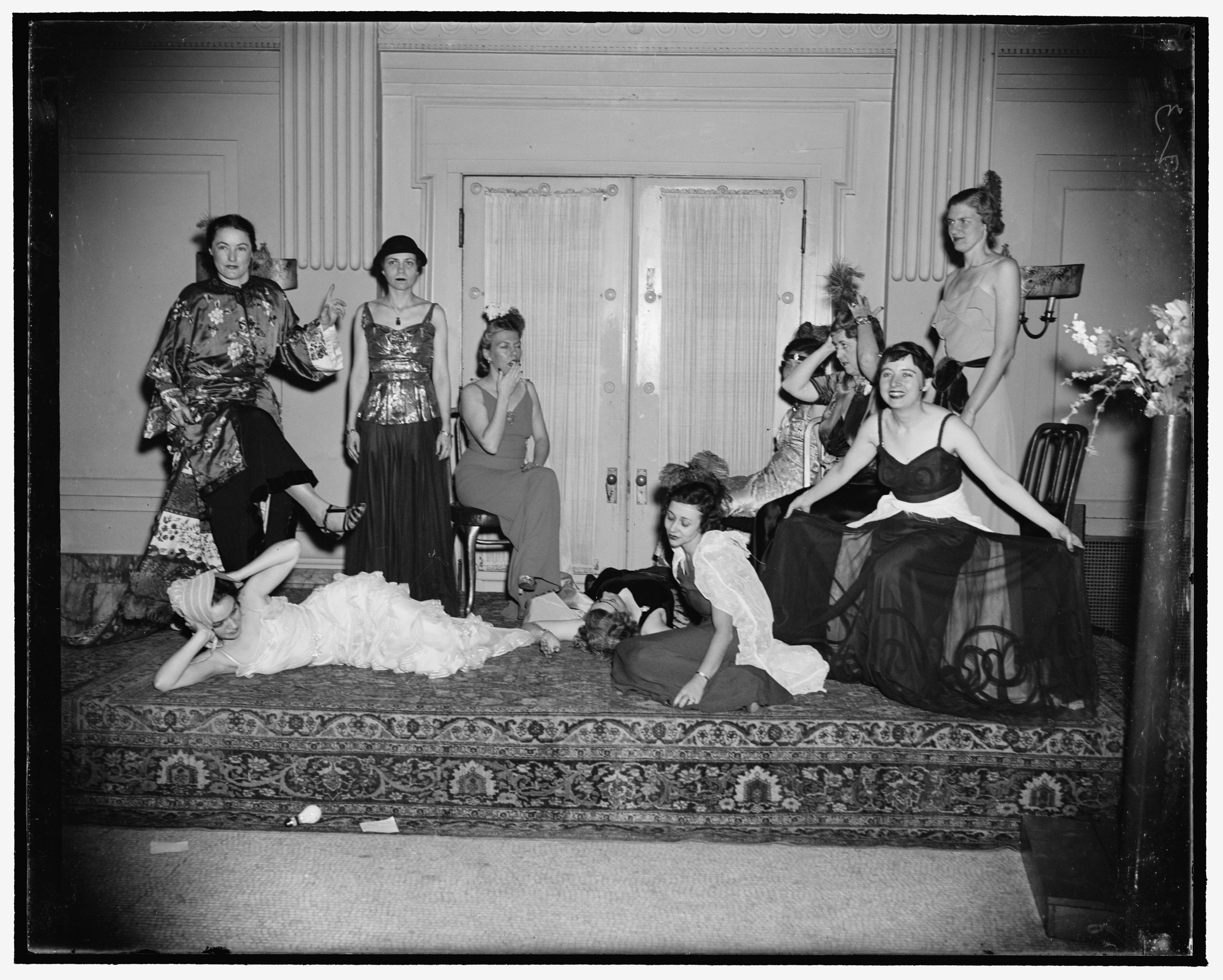
Campbell (center) attending a party at the White House in 1938

While working as a correspondent, she met Joseph Short, then an assistant day editor for AP. The couple married in 1937 although Campbell Short continued at the AP until she had their first child in 1940. The couple ultimately had three children: Victoria, Alexander and Stephen. She began to work part-time as a freelance writer. Her husband was appointed as President Harry S. Truman's press secretary in 1950 but after his unexpected death on September 18, 1952, she was named as Truman's correspondence secretary. She was the first woman to hold the position, replacing William D. Hassett. She stayed in this role until 1953, when the presidential administration changed.

Campbell Short briefly served as the public relations director for Story A Day Magazine before she became the publicity director for the Democratic Senatorial Campaign Committee from 1953 until 1956. She was hired as the press secretary for Mike Monroney, a Democratic senator from Oklahoma, serving between 1957 and 1966. She became a special assistant for research and development at the Office of Research and Statistics in the Social Security Administration until her retirement in 1978.

== Death and legacy ==
Short died on January 11, 1988, at Alexandria Hospital in Alexandria, Virginia, of lung cancer.
