= Roger Tubby =

American journalist and government official

United States Ambassador to the United Nations International Organizations in Geneva
- In office October 18, 1962 – September 24, 1969
- President: John F. Kennedy; Lyndon B. Johnson; Richard Nixon
- Preceded by: Graham Martin
- Succeeded by: Idar D. Rimestad

8th Assistant Secretary of State for Public Affairs
- In office March 10, 1961 – April 1, 1962
- President: John F. Kennedy
- Preceded by: Andrew H. Berding
- Succeeded by: Robert Manning

7th White House Press Secretary
- In office September 18, 1952 – January 20, 1953
- President: Harry S. Truman
- Preceded by: Joseph Short
- Succeeded by: James Hagerty

3rd Spokesperson for the United States Department of State
- In office 1945–1948
- President: Harry S. Truman
- Preceded by: Michael J. McDermott
- Succeeded by: Lincoln White

Personal details
- Born: Roger Wellington Tubby; December 30, 1910 Greenwich, Connecticut, U.S.
- Died: January 14, 1991 (aged 80) Saranac Lake, New York, U.S.
- Party: Democratic
- Children: Suzanne
- Education: Yale University (BA)

Roger Wellington Tubby (December 30, 1910 – January 14, 1991) was the seventh White House press secretary from 1952 to 1953 under President Harry Truman. From 1945 to 1948, he served as the spokesman of the United States Department of State.

== Career ==
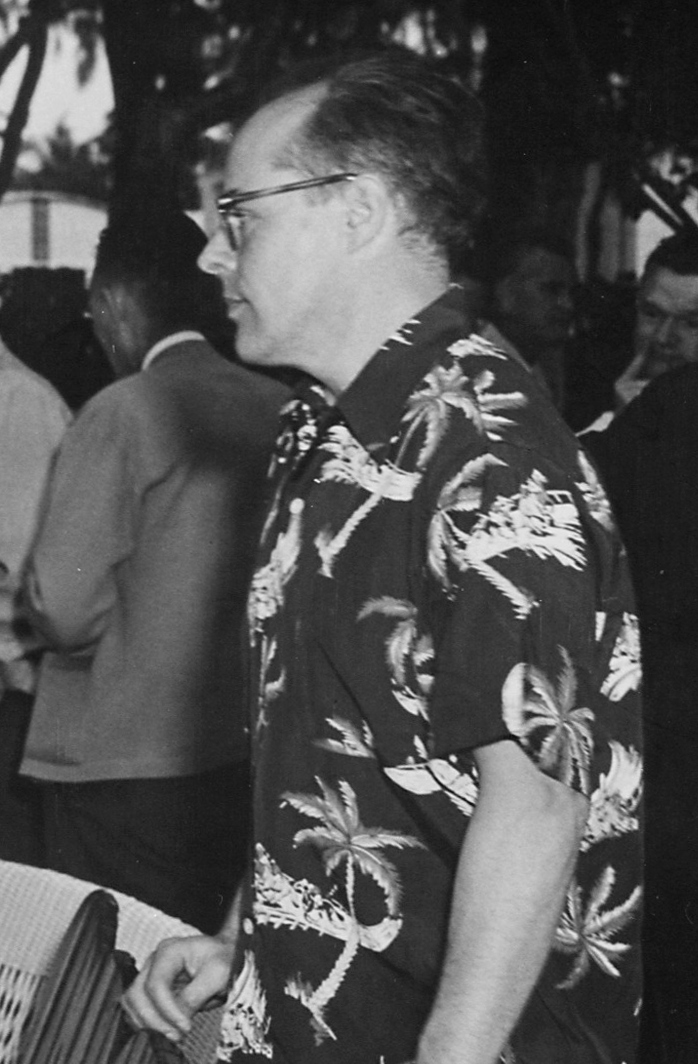
Assistant Press Secretary Roger Tubby (Profile) on March 15, 1951 at President Truman’s vacation residence in Key West, Florida

Roger Tubby born in Greenwich, Connecticut, in 1910 and went to Yale University. He was a reporter and then editor for the Bennington Banner Bennington, Vermont.

During World War II, Tubby worked for the Board of Economic Warfare, and when that became the Foreign Economic Administration, a combination of BEW and Lend-Lease, he became assistant to the administrator, Leo Crowley. Subsequently, he went to the Department of Commerce as Director of Information of the Office of International Trade; and after that to the Department of State in 1946 with Michael J. McDermott, who was then the chief spokesman of the Department of State.

In 1950, Tubby went to the White House as the assistant White House press secretary under Joseph Short. In 1953, John Foster Dulles asked him to come back to the State Department to be his Press Chief. Subsequently, in partnership with James Loeb, Tubby bought the Adirondack Daily Enterprise, a daily newspaper based in Saranac Lake, where he was co-publisher, editor, and jack-of-all-trades. Tubby later became president of the Adirondack Park Association, which covers all the communities of in the northeast corner of New York; he was also an advisor to the Governor on natural resources and conservation. For a short time, Tubby worked with Averell Harriman when he was Governor of New York.

In 1956, Tubby campaigned for Adlai Stevenson, and in 1960 joined John F. Kennedy at the Los Angeles convention and stayed with the Kennedy team through the election, serving as Director of Press Relations for the Democratic National Committee.

Tubby served President Kennedy as Assistant Secretary of State for Public Affairs from 1961 to 1962; and was Representative of the United States to the European Office of the United Nations in Geneva from 1962 to 1969. Tubby was Dean of the School of Professional Studies, Foreign Service Institute, Department of State.

Tubby kept a diary of his time at the White House. Before his death, he donated his personal papers to Yale University. According to the university archives, "The Roger W. Tubby Papers consist of voluminous personal diaries, as well as correspondence, writings, photographs, press releases, and newspaper clippings, ranging over the period 1925-83." The collection will not be available for research until 2050.

== Notes ==
Political offices
Preceded by Joseph Short	White House Press Secretary; 1952–1953	Succeeded by James Hagerty
Preceded by Andrew H. Berding	Assistant Secretary of State for Public Affairs; 1961–1962	Succeeded by Robert Manning
Diplomatic posts
Preceded by Graham Martin	United States Ambassador to the United Nations International Organizations in Geneva; 1967–1969	Succeeded by Idar D. Rimestad
