= Suzanne Batra =

American entomologist

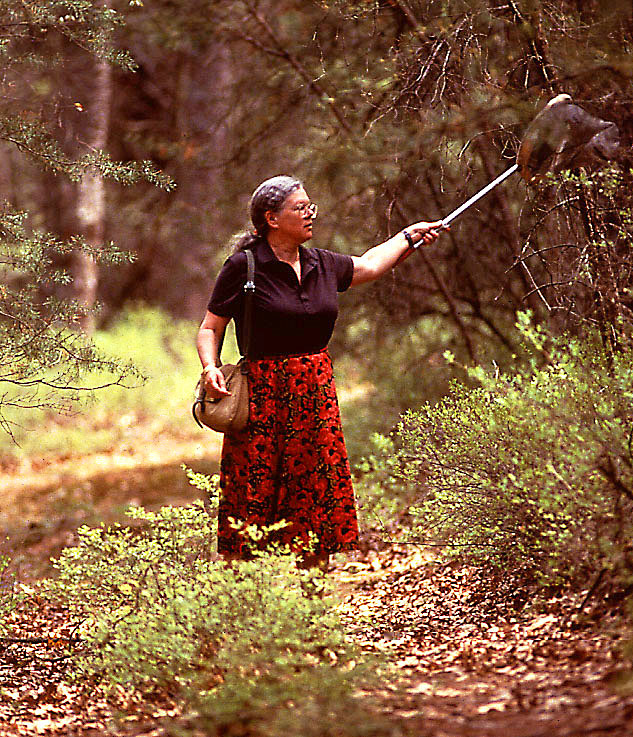
- Entomologist Suzanne Batra collecting polyester bees
- Born: December 15, 1937; New York City
- Alma mater: University of Kansas; Swarthmore College
- Occupation: Entomologist, botanist
- Spouse(s): Lekh Raj Batra
- Parent(s): Roger Tubby

Suzanne Wellington Tubby Batra (born December 15, 1937) is an American entomologist best known for her work on the classification of insect societies and for coining the term eusociality.

== Education and career ==
Batra graduated from Saranac Lake (New York) High School in 1956 and received a Bachelor of Arts in zoology from Swarthmore College in 1960. She married her botany professor Lekh R. Batra (1929–1999) and continued her studies in the University of Kansas under Charles D. Michener. She received a PhD in 1964 for studies on sociobiology of sweat bees. She studied solitary bees in the family Colletidae, including on the chemistry of their waterproof nest-cell linings made of polyesters.

=== Eusociality ===
The term eusocial (truly social) was first used by Batra in 1966 to describe the most social form of nesting behaviour she observed in halictid bees in India. She outlined sub-social or solitary behaviour, colonial or communal behaviour, semisocial behaviour, and finally eusocial: "in which the nest-founding parent survives to cooperate with a group of her mature daughters, with division of labor." Her definition has subsequently been expanded, but remains one of the most important areas of study in biology.

== Personal life ==
Batra was born in New York City where her father Roger W. Tubby was a journalist and secretary to President Truman, later serving in the United Nations as US Ambassador during the Kennedy period. At a young age, she was exposed to outdoor life, natural history, fishing and hunting especially after the family moved to the Adirondacks.

Batra had a daughter (1964) and a son (1967). She joined the US Department of Agriculture in Maryland in 1967, retiring in 1999. She continues to study bees at the Smithsonian Institution.
