= Roy A. Roberts =

American journalist and editor (1887–1967)

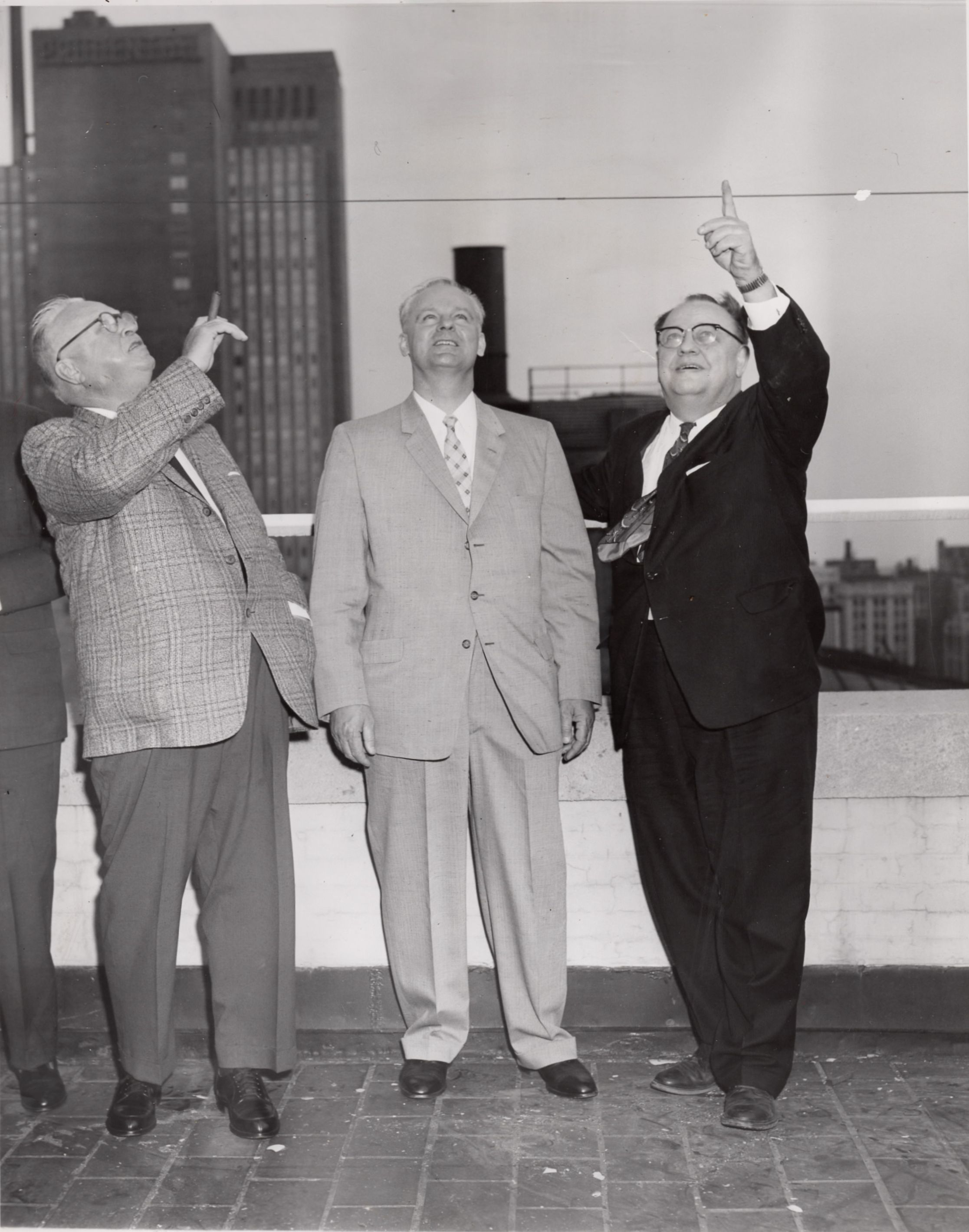
Roy A. Roberts (left), Amb. Mikhail A. Menshikov, and Milburn Akers on May 17, 1958 (Chicago Sun-Times)

Roy Allison Roberts (1887 – February 23, 1967) was a managing editor, president, editor and general manager of The Kansas City Star who guided the paper during its influential period during the presidencies of Harry S. Truman and Dwight D. Eisenhower.

== Early life and education ==
Roberts was born in Muscotah, Kansas and grew up in Lawrence, Kansas. He was a paperboy for the Star and studied journalism at the University of Kansas. One semester short of graduation, he dropped out to work for the Lawrence Journal-World to support his widowed mother and five siblings.

== Career ==
Roberts joined the Star in 1909 as a sports reporter and switched to covering the Missouri Legislature in 1910. In 1915, Star founder William Rockhill Nelson assigned him to be the Washington correspondent. After Nelson's death, Roberts was among the employees who bought the Star. He became managing editor in 1928 and member of the board of directors.

Roberts was to be closely identified with shaping Kansas Republican politics. He championed Kansas Governor Alf Landon in his unsuccessful 1936 race against Franklin Roosevelt. During Roberts' tenure, Kansas City rose to prominence due to the rise and fall of Democratic political boss Thomas Pendergast, which gave way to the rise of Harry Truman.

Roberts and Truman did not always see eye to eye during this period. Roberts championed Kansan Dwight D. Eisenhower in the 1952 race.

In 1963, Roberts stepped down as managing editor of the Star and became chairman of the board. He officially retired in 1965. The paper won five Pulitzer Prizes during his tenure.

Roberts was profiled in a Time cover article on April 12, 1948.

== Personal life ==
In 1953, Roberts married Florence G. Ross, the widow of Truman's Press Secretary Charles G. Ross.
