= Charles G. Ross =

American journalist and press secretary (1885–1950)

Charlie Ross
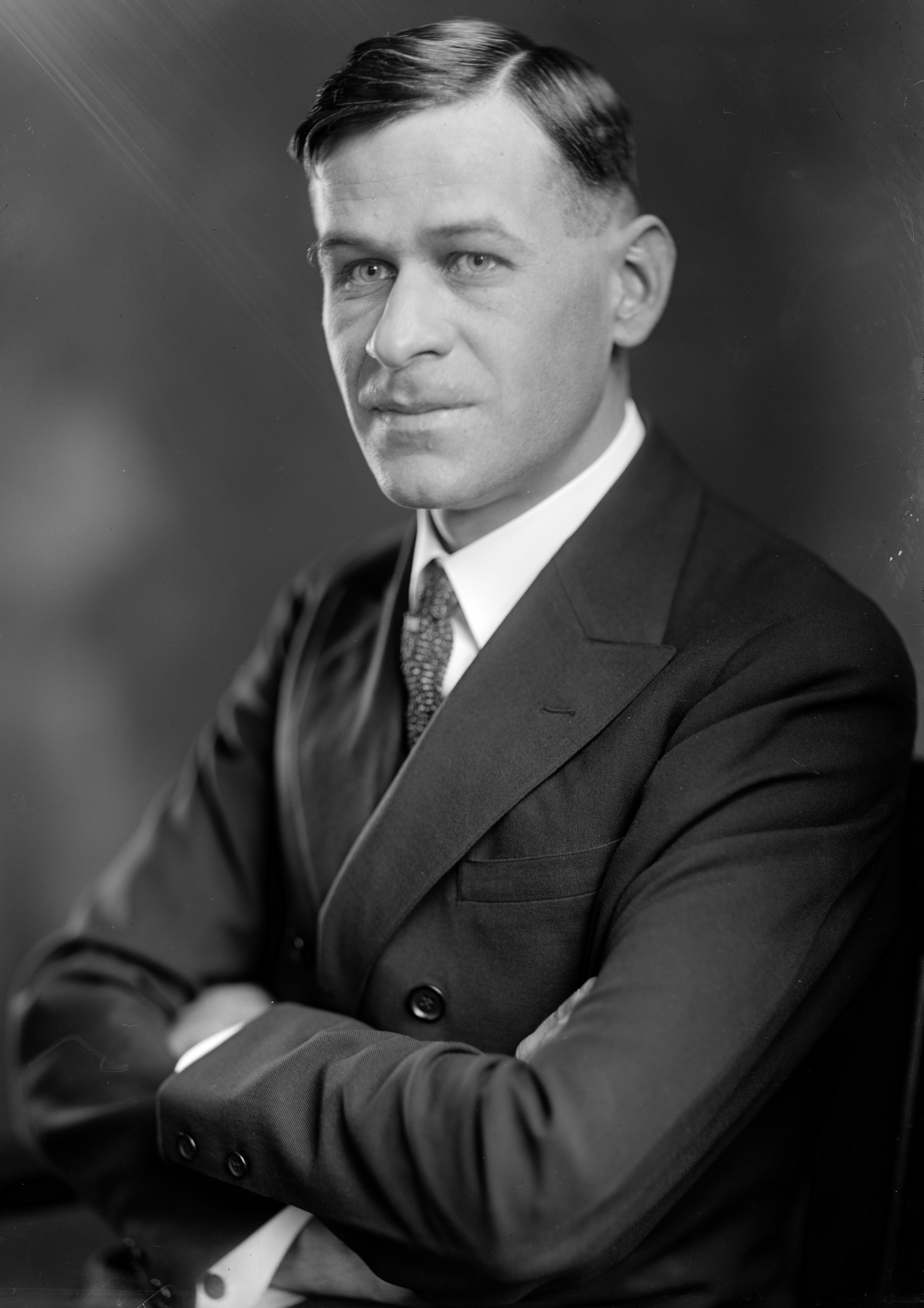
- Ross, 1905–1945

5th White House Press Secretary
- In office May 15, 1945 – December 5, 1950
- President: Harry S. Truman
- Preceded by: Jonathan W. Daniels
- Succeeded by: Stephen Early (Acting)

Personal details
- Born: Charles Griffith Ross; November 9, 1885 Independence, Missouri, U.S.
- Died: December 5, 1950 (aged 65) Washington, D.C., U.S.
- Party: Democratic
- Spouse: Florence Griffin
- Education: University of Missouri, Columbia (BA)

Charles Griffith Ross (November 9, 1885 – December 5, 1950) was the fifth White House press secretary from 1945 and 1950 under President Harry S. Truman.

== Early life ==
Ross graduated with Truman and Truman's eventual wife Bess Wallace in Independence, Missouri from Independence High School (later known as William Chrisman High School), class of 1901. He was initiated into the Sigma Chi fraternity and graduated from the University of Missouri in 1905. In 1908, he became the first professor of the newly formed Missouri School of Journalism.

== Pulitzer Prize ==
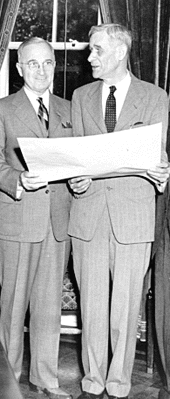
Harry Truman and Charles Ross

In 1918, he became the Chief Washington correspondent for the St. Louis Post-Dispatch. He won the 1932 Pulitzer Prize for his article titled, "The Country's Plight—What Can Be Done About It?", a discussion of the economic situation of the United States.

In 1934, he became the editorial page editor for the Post-Dispatch and then in 1939 became a contributing editor for the paper.

== White House Press Secretary ==
In 1945, Truman asked Ross to become his Press Secretary.

Despite his long-standing personal relationship with Truman, Ross gained a reputation for trustworthiness since reporters knew he spoke for the president both on and off the record. Very few reporters felt Ross led them astray either.

=== Death ===
Ross died of a coronary occlusion at his desk in the White House in December 1950 after giving a press conference as he was preparing to make some comments to the television news. He was buried in Washington's Mount Olivet Cemetery.

== Family ==
His widow, Florence Griffin, married The Kansas City Star editor Roy A. Roberts in 1953.

Political offices
Preceded by Jonathan W. Daniels	White House Press Secretary; 1945–1950	Succeeded by Stephen Early; Acting
