= Jonathan W. Daniels =

American writer, editor and White House Press Secretary

Jonathan Daniels
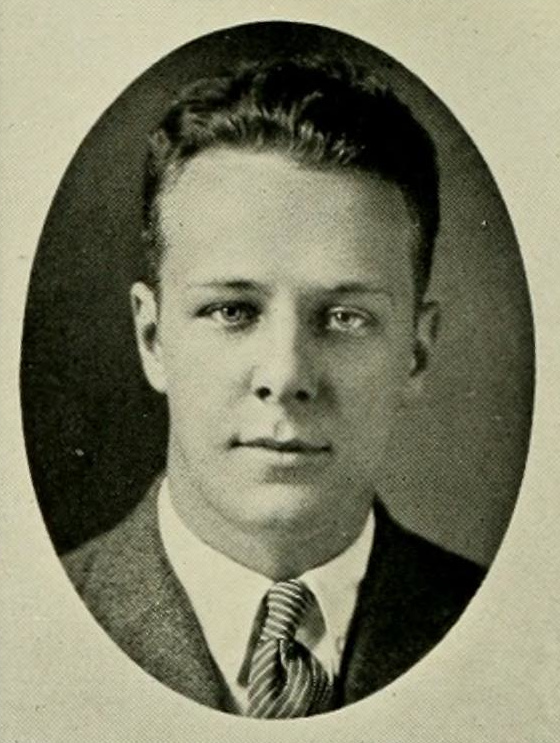
- Daniels in 1921

4th White House Press Secretary
- In office March 29, 1945 – May 15, 1945
- President: Franklin D. Roosevelt; Harry S. Truman
- Preceded by: Stephen Early
- Succeeded by: Charlie Ross

Personal details
- Born: Jonathan Worth Daniels; April 26, 1902 Raleigh, North Carolina, U.S.
- Died: November 6, 1981 (aged 79) Hilton Head Island, South Carolina, U.S.
- Party: Democratic
- Spouse(s): Elizabeth Bridgers; Lucy Billing Cathcart
- Children: 4 daughters (including Lucy)
- Education: University of North Carolina, Chapel Hill (BA, MA); Columbia University (attended)

Jonathan Worth Daniels (April 26, 1902 – November 6, 1981) was an American writer and editor who served as the fourth White House press secretary from March to May 1945 under President Franklin D. Roosevelt and then President Harry S. Truman. He was a founding member of the Peabody Awards Board of Jurors, serving from 1940 until 1950. For most of his life, he worked at The News & Observer, and later founded The Island Packet.

== Education ==
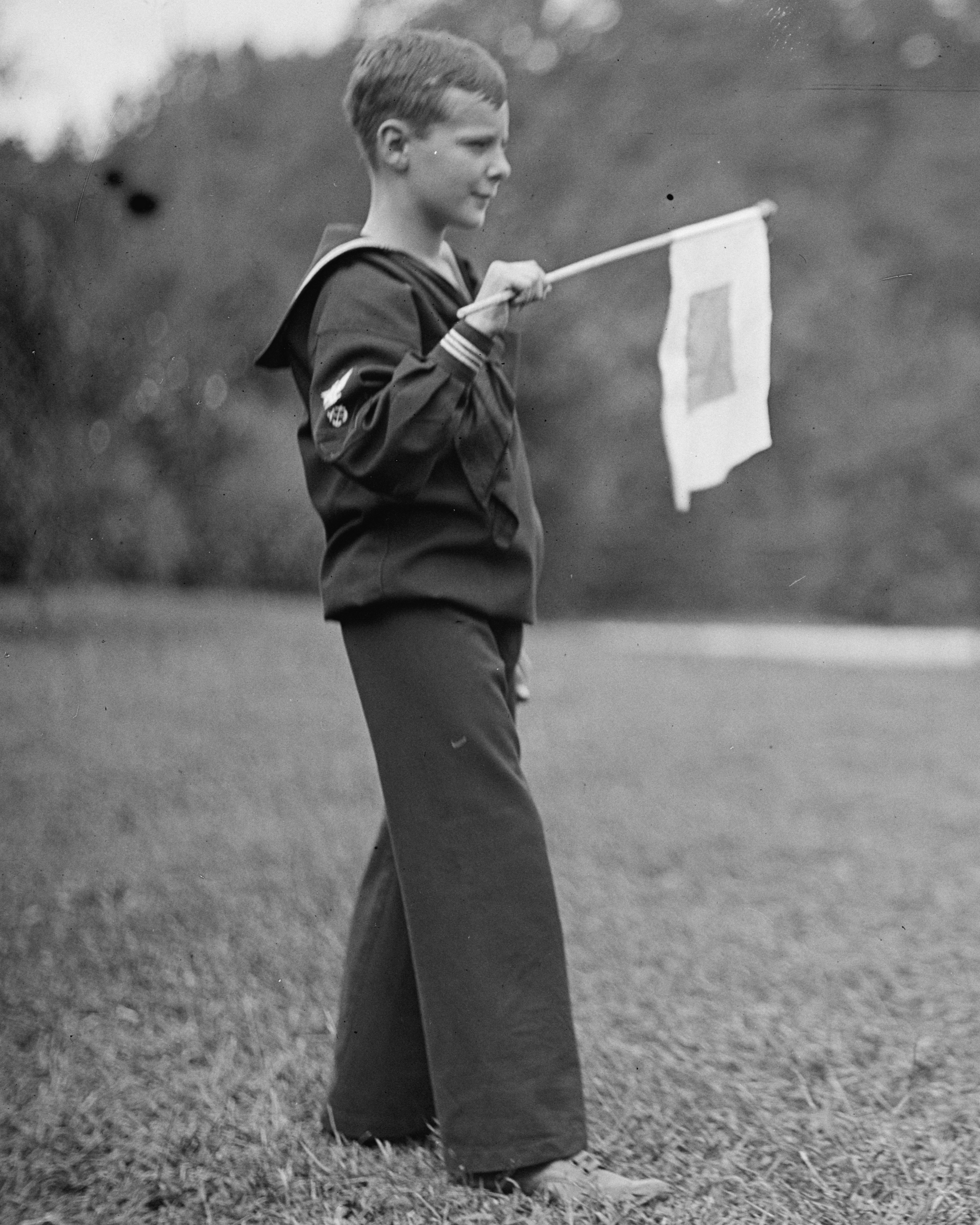
Jonathan W. Daniels at age 13 with semaphore flag.

Jonathan Worth Daniels was the son of Josephus Daniels and Addie Worth Bagley Daniels. He attended Centennial School in Raleigh from 1908 to 1913. When his father became United States Secretary of the Navy in 1913, the family moved to Washington, D.C., where he studied at the John Eaton School from 1913 to 1915, and St. Albans School from 1915 to 1918. Daniels attended the University of North Carolina at Chapel Hill, and graduated in 1921 with a B.A. He continued at UNC for graduate school, earning an M.A. in English in 1921. As a student in Chapel Hill, he edited The Daily Tar Heel and participated in the Carolina Playmakers.

Daniels passed the North Carolina bar exam despite failing out of Columbia University Law School, but never practiced law. In 1930, he was awarded a year-long Guggenheim Fellowship in fiction, which he spent in France. Years later, his daughter Lucy Daniels would also receive a Guggenheim for fiction, in 1957.

== White House Press Secretary ==
After World War II began, Daniels went into government service, first as assistant director of the Office of Civilian Defense and later as one of six administrative assistants for President Franklin D. Roosevelt (who had worked under Josephus Daniels during World War I). In March 1945, less than one month before his death, Roosevelt named Daniels his press secretary, and he continued in the position temporarily under President Harry S. Truman.

== Later life ==
Daniels returned to The News & Observer in 1947 and became its editor in 1948, upon the death of his father.

In 1966, he revealed the affair between Roosevelt and Lucy Mercer Rutherfurd in his book The Time Between the Wars. He died in 1981.

== Books ==
- Clash of Angels

New York: Brewer and Warren (1930)

- The Devil's Backbone: The Story of the Natchez Trace

New York: McGraw-Hill (1962) (Also published in later editions)

- The End of Innocence

Philadelphia: J. B. Lippincott & Co. (1954) (Also published in later editions)

- Frontier on the Potomac

New York: Macmillan (1946) (Also published in a later edition)

- The Gentlemanly Serpent and Other Columns from a Newspaperman in Paradise: From the Pages of the Hilton Head Island Packet, 1970-73

Columbia: University of South Carolina Press (1974)

- The Man of Independence

Philadelphia: J. B. Lippincott & Co. (1950) (Also published in a later editions)

- Mosby: Gray Ghost of the Confederacy

Philadelphia: J. B. Lippincott & Co. (1959)

- Ordeal of Ambition: Jefferson, Hamilton, Burr

Garden City, N.Y: Doubleday (1970)

- Prince of Carpetbaggers

Philadelphia: J. B. Lippincott & Co. (1958)

- The Randolphs of Virginia

Garden City, N.Y.: Doubleday (1972)

- Robert E. Lee

Boston: Houghton, Mifflin (1960)

- A Southerner Discovers New England

New York: Macmillan (1940)

- A Southerner Discovers the South

New York: Macmillan, (1938) (Also published in a later edition)

- Stonewall Jackson

New York: Random House (1959)

- Tar Heels: A Portrait of North Carolina

New York: Dodd, Mead (1941) (Also published in a later edition)

- They Will Be Heard: America's Crusading Newspaper Editors

New York: McGraw-Hill (1965)

- The Times Between the Wars: Armistice to Pearl Harbor

Garden City, N.Y.: Doubleday (1966) (Also published in a later edition)

- Washington Quadrille: The Dance beside the Documents

Garden City, N.Y.: Doubleday (1968)

- White House Witness, 1942-1945

Garden City, N.Y.: Doubleday (1975)

== Notes ==
Political offices
Preceded by Stephen Early	White House Press Secretary; 1945	Succeeded by Charlie Ross
