= Lekh Raj Batra =

Indian-American biologist (1929–1999)

- Born: Lekh Raj Batra; 26 November 1929; Bhakkar, Punjab, British India
- Died: 20 May 1999 (aged 69); Washington D.C., United States
- Education: Panjab University (BSc, MSc); Cornell University (PhD)
- Spouse: Suzanne Batra
- Scientific career
- Fields: Mycology
- Workplaces: Deshbandhu College; Swarthmore College; University of Kansas; Beltsville Agricultural Research Center
- Thesis: (1958)
- Doctoral advisor: Richard P. Korf

Lekh Raj Batra (26 November 1929 – 20 May 1999) was a distinguished mycologist and linguist. He studied the symbiotic relationships of fungi and beetles focusing on ambrosia beetles and fungi, bio-systematics of hemiascomycetes and discomycetes and fungal diseases.

== Early life and education ==
Batra was born in Nawan Jandanwala, a village in the Thal Desert in Western Punjab, British India. His immediate family included two sisters and two brothers. Batra was the first member of his family to receive schooling, and he attended high school in Lahore, Pakistan. However, in the ethnic violence following the partition of British India in 1947, he lost all of his relatives on his mother's side, and his penniless family moved to Punjab, India. There, he began his interest in mycology as he hunted the hills for edible mushrooms to feed his family. After arriving in India, he went on to earn his Bachelors and Masters of Science degrees with Honours in Botany from Panjab University, Chandigarh as a President of India scholar. In 1956, he moved to the United States of America to study at Cornell University under the mycologist Richard P. Korf, receiving his Doctorate in Botany in 1958.

== Career ==
Batra served as a lecturer for one year at the Deshbandhu College in Delhi before moving to the US. He also served in the Indian army. After completing his doctorate at Cornell University, he started teaching botany at Swarthmore College near Philadelphia where he met Suzanne W. Tubby, his future wife. He briefly worked for the Indian government in the 1960s. He returned to the United States and joined the University of Kansas as a research associate while his wife was working on her doctorate in entomology there. Batra later became an assistant and associate professor, working on the symbiotic relationship of ambrosia fungi and beetles. In 1963, he became a US citizen. After his wife graduated in 1967, they moved to Beltsville, Maryland where he joined federal government's Beltsville Agricultural Research Center and became a senior scientist and research leader. In 1986, he served as science advisor to the director of Beltsville. He retired in 1994. After his retirement, he served as coordinator of the International Encyclopedia of Life Support Systems, a UNESCO project aimed at providing information regarding food and agriculture for developing countries.

== Personal life ==
Batra married one of his students, the entomologist Suzanne W. Tubby, in a Hindu wedding ceremony on 12 June 1960 in Delhi, India, and they had two children, daughter Mira and son Persa.

He was a man of diverse interests, famous for his excellent sense of humor. Once, he dressed up in a plaid shirt, jeans and a straw hat and entered the Greenbelt Labor Day parade, with 13 piglets and a sow that he had borrowed from the research station. He was also actively involved in the community activities and affairs in Beltsville, taking part in the opposition to sale of the research station's land to developers.

Batra was a noted linguist, fluent in six Indian languages, as well as a master in English, Hindi, Urdu, French and German. He additionally knew some Arabic and Russian, and was reported to have translated Khruschev's famous 1956 speech, "On the Cult of Personality and Its Consequences", from Russian to both English and Arabic for others as he listened to the speech on television. According to his former Beltsville colleague, Marie Tousignant, he also combined his interests in linguistics and mycology and "... once translated all of the Latin scientific terms into Japanese".

Batra died following a cerebral hemorrhage in Washington, D.C., on 20 May 1999. His funeral followed a traditional Indian reception where, in reference to his field of study, mourners were served with truffles, morels, oyster and shiitake mushrooms. He featured among the 10 people selected by the Washington Post for their annual in memoriam article, "Passings 1999".

== Publications ==
During his career, Batra published more than 130 articles and reviews, and authored four monographs including World Species of Monilinia. He served as an editor and edited four books and two volumes of a journal. He traveled the world before retirement in search of unknown fungi, discovering 38 new fungal species and 7 fungal diseases. He collaborated with wife Suzanne in studying fungus-cultivating insects, with their overview appearing in Scientific American in 1967. They also published on the mummy-berry disease of blueberries and huckleberries caused by Monilinia species, with their work published in Science in 1985. Batra was writing an autobiography, with a focus on his Indus Valley boyhood, but this was not complete when he died in 1999.

== See also ==
- List of mycologists

== Selected publications ==
- Batra, L.R. (1966). "Ambrosia fungi: extent of specificity in ambrosia beetles". Science. 153 (3732): 193–195. Bibcode:1966Sci...153..193B. doi:10.1126/science.153.3732.193. PMID 17831508. S2CID 25612420.
- Batra, S.W.T.; Batra, L.R. (1967). "The fungus gardens of insects". Sci Am. 217 (5): 112–20. Bibcode:1967SciAm.217e.112B. doi:10.1038/scientificamerican1167-112.
- Batra, L.R. (1967). "Ambrosia fungi: a taxonomic revision and nutritional studies of some species". Mycologia. 59 (6): 976–1017. doi:10.1080/00275514.1967.12018485.
- Batra, L.R.; Batra, S.W.T.; Bohart, G.E. (1973). "The mycoflora of domesticated and wild bees (Apoidea)". Mycol Appl. 49: 13–44. doi:10.1007/bf02057445. S2CID 45679299.
- Batra, L.R.; Millner, P.D. (1976). "Asian fermented foods and beverages. In: Unterkifler LA, ed. Developments in industrial mycology. Washington, DC". Soc Indust Microbiol. 17: 117–128.
- Batra, L.R.; Batra, S.W.T. (1985). "Floral mimicry induced by mummy-berry fungus exploits host's pollinators as vectors". Science. 228 (1011–1013): 1011–3. Bibcode:1985Sci...228.1011B. doi:10.1126/science.228.4702.1011. PMID 17797664. S2CID 21422865.
- Names of Japanese Plants in Romanized Katakana and Scientific Nomenclature.

== Monographs ==
1. Nematosporaceae (Hemiascomycetidae): taxonomy, pathogenicity, distribution and vector relations. USDA Tech Bull 1469:1-77. 1973
2. Insect-fungus symbiosis: nutrition, mutualism and commensalisms. Montclair, New Jersey: Allanheld, Osmun & Co. 276 p. 1979
3. World species of Monilinia (Fungi): their ecology, biosystematics and control. Mycologia Mem 16. 246 p. 1991
