= James Hagerty =

American journalist

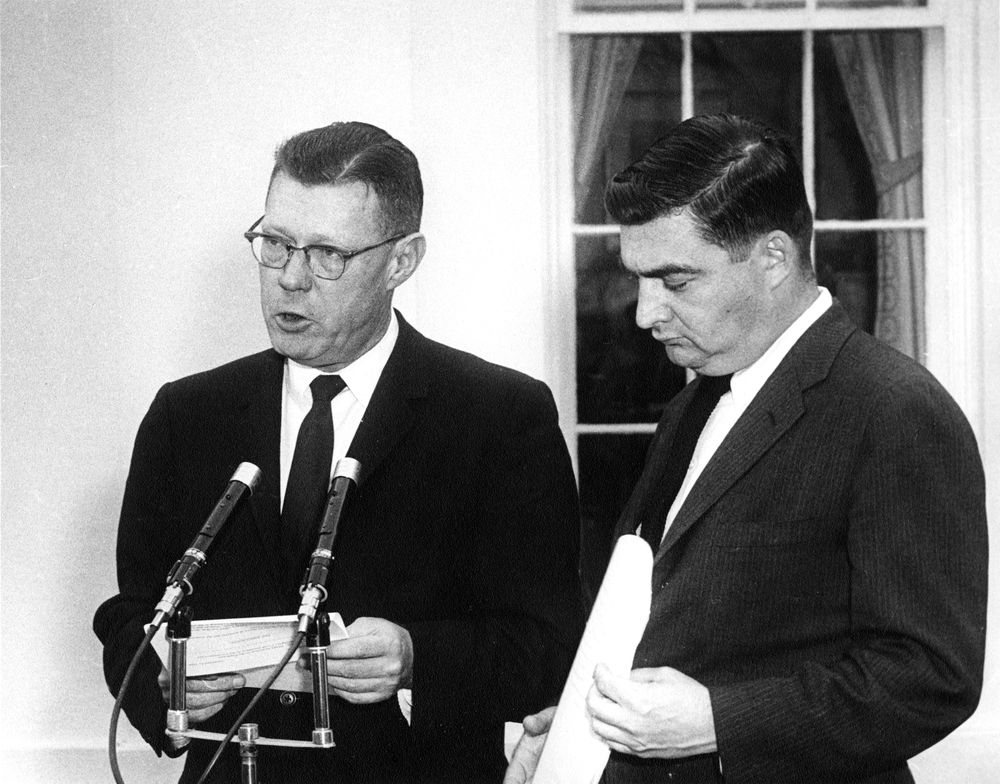
- James C. Hagerty and Pierre Salinger 6 December 1960

8th White House Press Secretary
- In office January 20, 1953 – January 20, 1961
- President: Dwight D. Eisenhower
- Preceded by: Roger Tubby
- Succeeded by: Pierre Salinger

Personal details
- Born: James Campbell Hagerty; May 9, 1909 Plattsburgh, New York, U.S.
- Died: April 11, 1981 (aged 71) Bronxville, New York, U.S.
- Party: Republican
- Spouse: Marjorie Lucas
- Education: Columbia University (BA)

James Campbell Hagerty (May 9, 1909 – April 11, 1981) served as the eighth White House press secretary from 1953 to 1961 during the Presidency of Dwight D. Eisenhower. He was known for providing much more detail on the lifestyle of the president than previous press secretaries; for example, he covered in great detail Eisenhower's medical condition. Most of the time, he handled routine affairs such as daily reports on presidential activities, defending presidential policies, and assisting diplomatic visitors. He handled embarrassing episodes, such as those related to the Soviet downing of an American spy plane, the U-2 in 1960. He handled press relations on Eisenhower's international trips, sometimes taking the blame from a hostile foreign press. Eisenhower often relied on him for advice about public opinion, and how to phrase complex issues. Hagerty had a reputation for supporting civil rights initiatives.

== Early life ==
After his Irish Catholic family moved to New York when he was three years old, James Hagerty attended Evander Childs High School in the Bronx, before enrolling in and graduating from Blair Academy, which he attended for his last two years in high school. He graduated from Columbia College in 1934, and worked as a reporter for The New York Times.

== Political career ==
He became the press secretary to Governor of New York Thomas E. Dewey in 1943, and handled Dewey's presidential campaigns in 1944 and in 1948. He was in charge of candidate Eisenhower's press office in the 1952 campaign, leading to his appointment as Press Secretary in January 1953. He introduced television cameras to press conferences in 1955. He occasionally handled political assignments from Eisenhower, such as liaison with the Senate.

=== "Hagerty Incident" ===
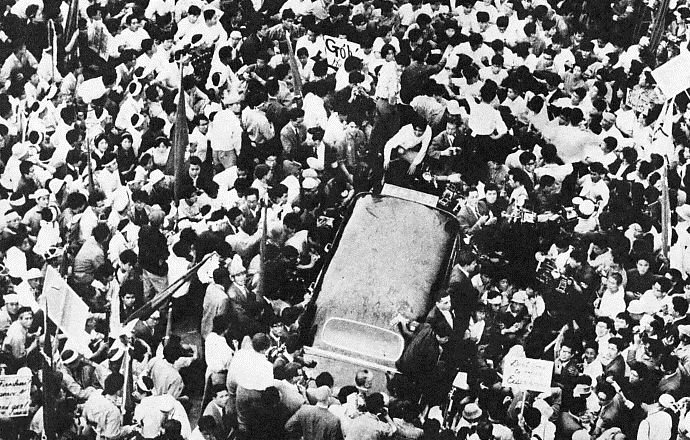
Hagerty's car is mobbed by protestors, June 10, 1960

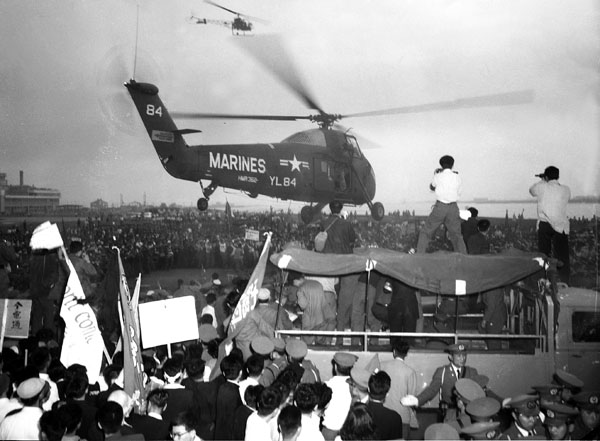
A US Marines helicopter comes to Hagerty's rescue, June 10, 1960

In 1960, Hagerty was at the center of a major diplomatic incident between the United States and Japan. On June 10, Hagerty arrived at Tokyo's Haneda Airport to make advance preparations for a planned visit to Japan by Eisenhower that was scheduled for later that month. Hagerty was picked up in a black car by US Ambassador to Japan Douglas MacArthur II (the nephew of the famous general), but as the car left the airport it was surrounded by 6,000 Japanese protesters protesting the revision of the U.S.-Japan Security Treaty as part of the broader 1960 Anpo protests. The protesters surrounded the car, rocking it back and forth for more than an hour while cracking its windows, smashing its tail lights, standing on its roof, and chanting anti-American slogans and singing protest songs. Ultimately, MacArthur and Hagerty had to be rescued by a US Marines military helicopter, creating indelible imagery of the so-called "Hagerty Incident" (ハガチー事件, Hagachii jiken) that was transmitted by newswires around the world. The Hagerty Incident shocked much of the Japanese public, insofar as it was seen as a grave discourtesy to a foreign guest, and contributed to the cancellation of Eisenhower's visit, for fear that his safety could not be guaranteed, as well as the forced resignation of Japanese prime minister Nobusuke Kishi shortly thereafter.

== Television work ==
Hagerty appeared as a mystery challenger on the March 10, 1957, and panelist on the June 23, 1957 episodes of What's My Line?

After Eisenhower left office in January 1961, Hagerty became a vice president of the ABC television network, serving from 1961 to 1975.

== Quotes ==
"If you lose your temper at a newspaper columnist, he'll get rich or famous or both."

Political offices
Preceded by Roger Tubby	White House Press Secretary; 1953–1961	Succeeded by Pierre Salinger
