= Joseph Short =

American journalist

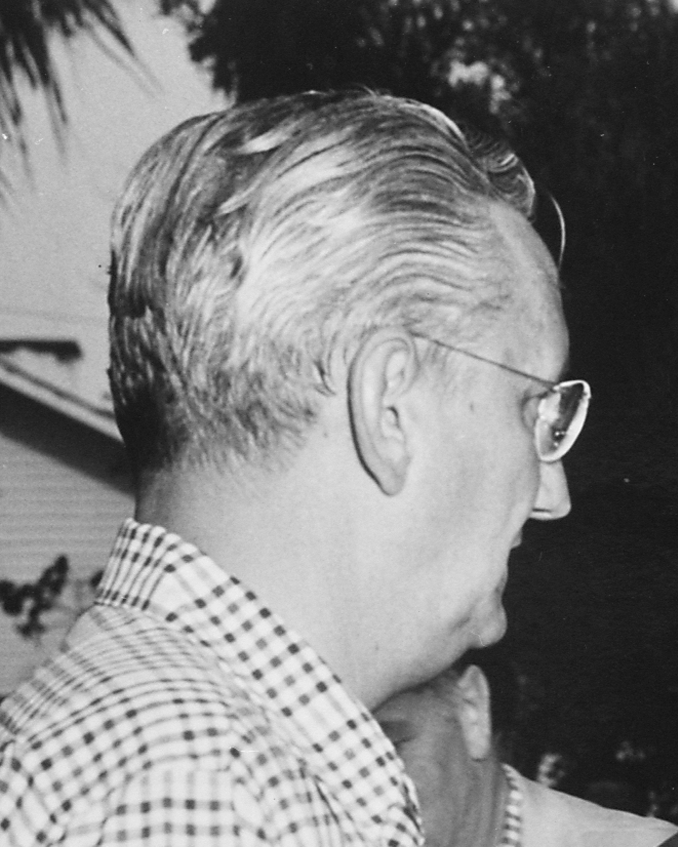
- Short in 1951

6th White House Press Secretary
- In office December 18, 1950 – September 18, 1952
- President: Harry S. Truman
- Preceded by: Stephen Early (Acting)
- Succeeded by: Roger Tubby

Personal details
- Born: Joseph Hudson Short Jr. February 11, 1904 Vicksburg, Mississippi, U.S.
- Died: September 18, 1952 (aged 48) Washington, D.C., U.S.
- Party: Democratic
- Spouse: Beth Campbell Short (1937–1952)
- Education: Virginia Military Institute (BA)

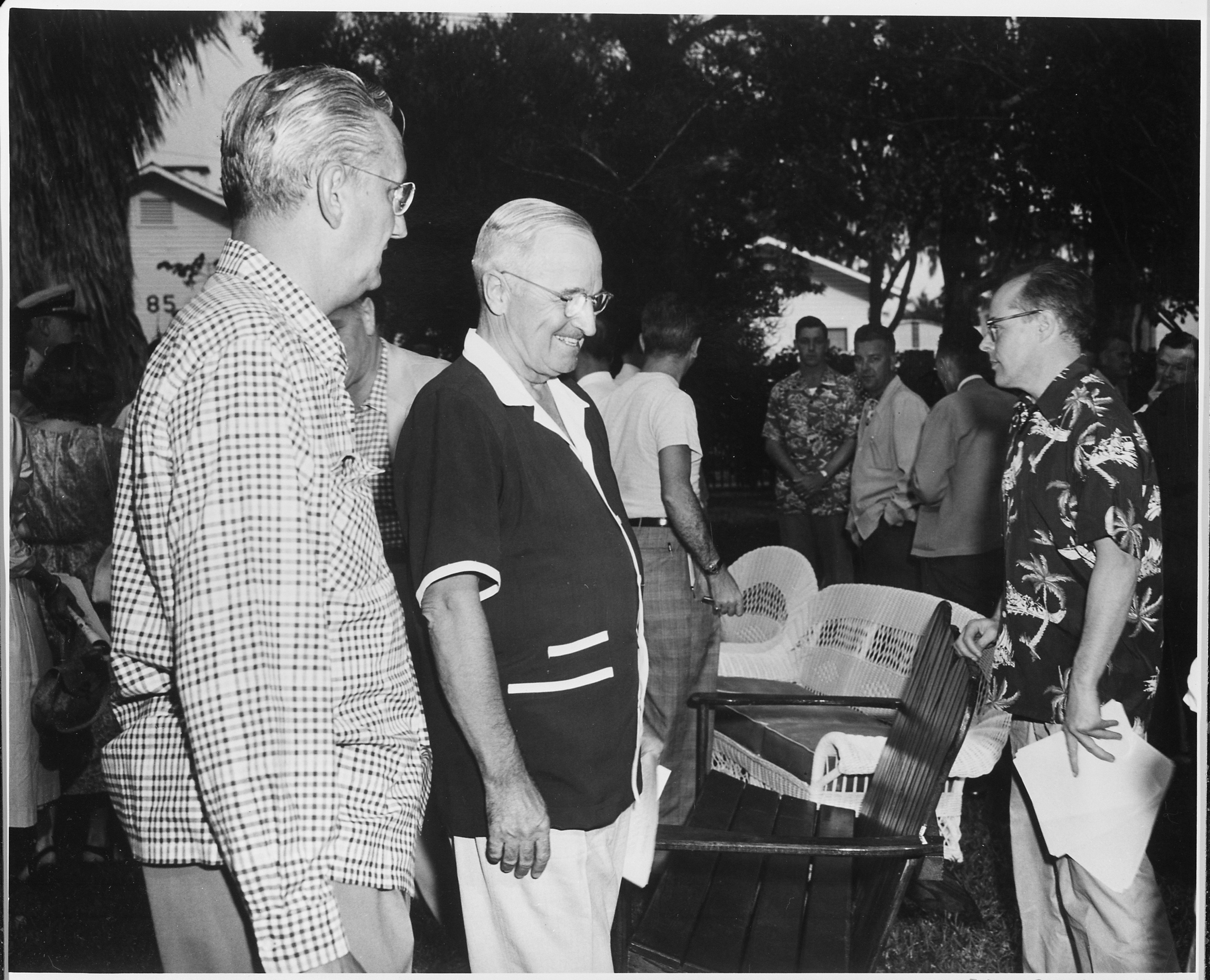
Press Secretary Joseph Short (Profile) on March 15, 1951, at President Truman's vacation residence in Key West, Florida.

Joseph Hudson Short Jr. (February 11, 1904 – September 18, 1952) was an American journalist and government official who was the sixth White House press secretary from 1950 to 1952 under President Harry S. Truman. Previously, he had worked as Washington correspondent for various media.

== Timeline ==
- 1904 (February 11) Born, Vicksburg, Mississippi
- 1925 A.B., Virginia Military Institute
- 1925-1929 Reporter in Vicksburg and Jackson, Mississippi, and New Orleans, Louisiana
- 1929-1931 Correspondent for the Associated Press, Richmond, Virginia Bureau
- 1931-1941 Correspondent for the Associated Press, Washington, D.C. Bureau
- 1937 (December 27) Married Beth Campbell Short
- 1941-1943 Correspondent for the Chicago Sun, Washington, D.C.
- 1943-1950 Correspondent for the Baltimore Sun, Washington, D.C.
- 1950-1952 Press Secretary to the President
- 1952 (September 18) Died, Washington, D.C

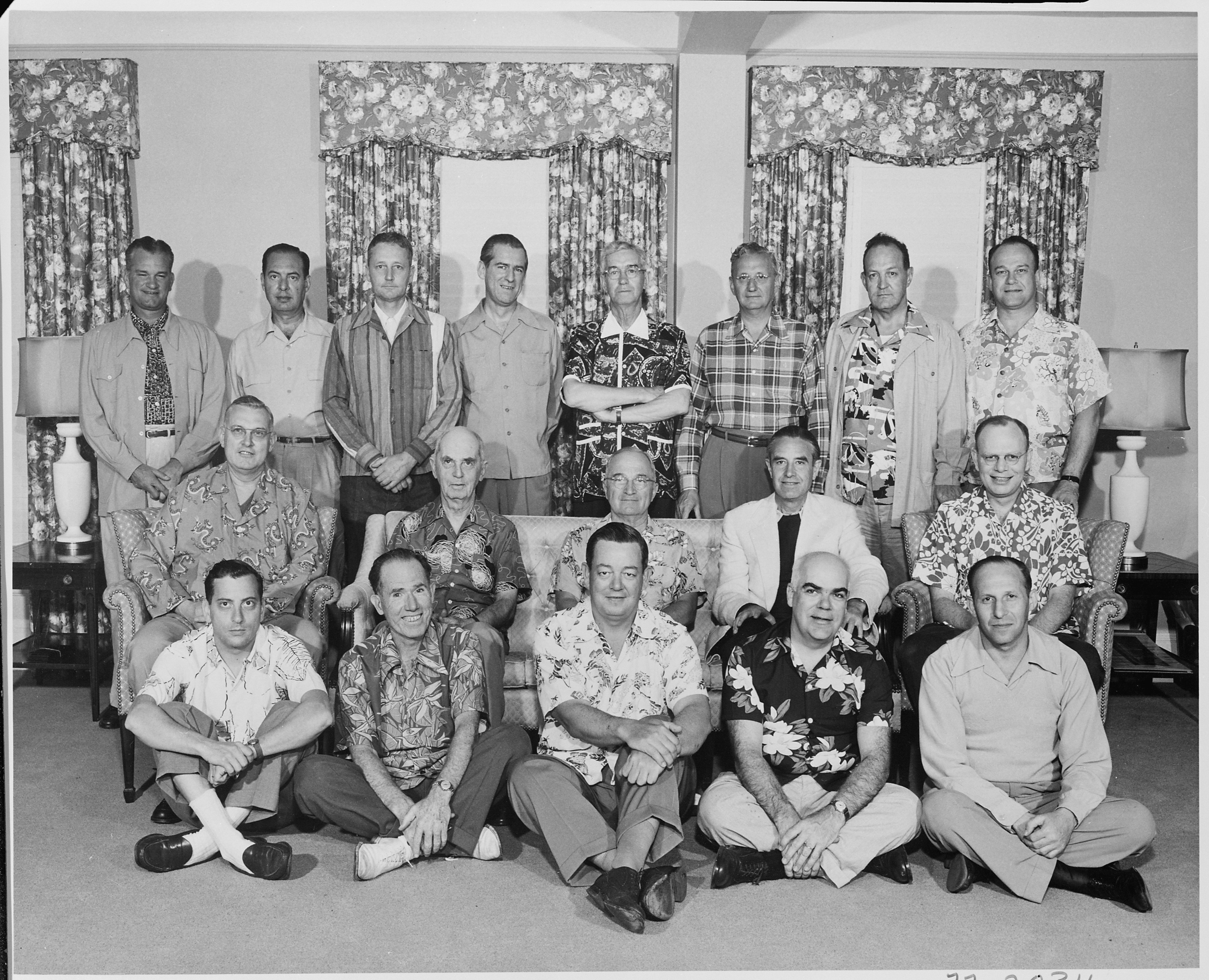
Short is the 3rd from the right in back row: Truman's staff during the President's vacation (1951)

Political offices
Preceded by Stephen Early; Acting	White House Press Secretary; 1950–1952	Succeeded by Roger Tubby
