= Stephen Early =

American journalist (1889–1951)

Steve Early
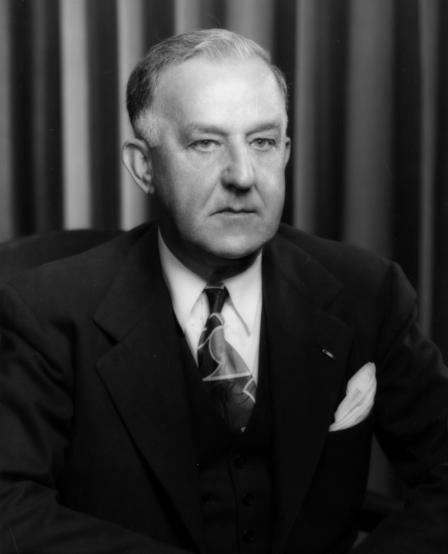

3rd White House Press Secretary
- In office December 5, 1950 – December 18, 1950; Acting
- President: Harry S. Truman
- Preceded by: Charlie Ross
- Succeeded by: Joseph Short
- In office March 4, 1933 – March 29, 1945
- President: Franklin D. Roosevelt
- Preceded by: Theodore Joslin
- Succeeded by: Jonathan W. Daniels

1st United States Deputy Secretary of Defense
- In office May 2, 1949 – September 30, 1950
- President: Harry S. Truman
- Preceded by: Position established
- Succeeded by: Robert A. Lovett

Personal details
- Born: Stephen Tyree Early; August 27, 1889 Crozet, Virginia, U.S.
- Died: August 11, 1951 (aged 61) Washington, D.C., U.S.
- Party: Democratic

Stephen Tyree Early (August 27, 1889 – August 11, 1951) was an American journalist and government official. He served as the third White House press secretary under Franklin D. Roosevelt from 1933 to 1945 and as the acting press secretary under President Harry S. Truman in 1950 after the sudden death of Charles Griffith Ross. Early served as press secretary longer than any other person.

== Career ==
Early met Franklin D. Roosevelt while covering the 1912 Democratic National Convention as a reporter for the United Press. From 1913 to 1917 Early was the Associated Press correspondent covering the Navy Department, during which time his acquaintance with Roosevelt and Louis Howe grew.

After serving in World War I with an infantry regiment and the Stars and Stripes he returned to the United States and was asked by Roosevelt to be the advance man for the 1920 vice presidential campaign. After the election, Early returned to the Associated Press. In August 1923 Early covered the western trip of President Warren Harding in San Francisco and was the first newspaper man to report there that Harding had suddenly died. In 1927 he became the Washington representative of Paramount News, a newsreel company at the time.

=== Roosevelt administration ===
After the election of 1932, Franklin Roosevelt asked him to serve as one of the three White House Secretaries, responsible for press relations. Early held that post throughout the Roosevelt years. As press secretary, he served as spokesman and troubleshooter for the president and maintained an open-door policy with White House correspondents. Having been a reporter, he understood the news business and did his best to accommodate it. Early also helped persuade the White House Correspondents Association to issue press credentials to Harry McAlpin of the National Negro Publishers Association. In 1944, McAlpin became the first African American reporter to attend presidential press conferences.

He was also known to have had a temper. Less than a month before the 1940 presidential election, Early kneed a black police officer in the groin outside Madison Square Garden. Roosevelt had already been facing skepticism from black voters because of his failure to desegregate the military. Roosevelt responded days before the election by appointing the nation's first black general, Benjamin O. Davis Sr., and announcing the creation of the Tuskegee Airmen.

=== Commercial and Defense appointments ===
In 1945, he became vice president of the Pullman Company. He returned to the government as under secretary and later United States deputy secretary of defense from April 1949 to June 1950.

=== Truman administration ===
In December 1950, Early was briefly press secretary to President Truman, filling in after the sudden death of Charles G. Ross.

== Personal life ==
Early died at George Washington Hospital on August 11, 1951. He had suffered a heart attack a week prior, and despite signs of recovery, had a turn for the worse. It was reported that he died at about one in the afternoon. Survivors included Helen Wrenn Early, whom he married in 1921, two sons and a daughter. Harry Truman issued a statement calling him "an outstanding newspaper man" and "always on the side of President Roosevelt." Defense Secretary George Marshall said in a statement that he was "very distressed" at the news of Early's death and that he "served his country faithfully for many years." The full statements and other information on his life can be found in his New York Times obituary, printed on August 12, 1951.

In 1969, his widow donated his papers to the Franklin D. Roosevelt Presidential Library, where they could be accessed by the public.

Political offices
Preceded by Theodore Joslin	White House Press Secretary; 1933–1945	Succeeded by Jonathan W. Daniels
New office	United States Deputy Secretary of Defense; 1949–1950	Succeeded by Robert A. Lovett
Preceded by Charlie Ross	White House Press Secretary; Acting; 1950	Succeeded by Joseph Short
