= George E. Akerson =

American journalist (1889–1937)

George Akerson
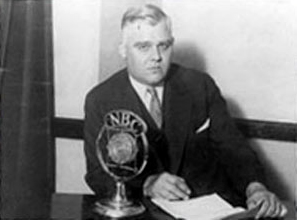

1st White House Press Secretary
- In office March 4, 1929 – March 16, 1931
- President: Herbert Hoover
- Preceded by: Position established
- Succeeded by: Theodore Joslin

White House Appointments Secretary
- In office March 4, 1929 – March 16, 1931
- President: Herbert Hoover
- Preceded by: Position established
- Succeeded by: Theodore Joslin

Personal details
- Born: George Edward Akerson; September 5, 1889 Minneapolis, Minnesota, U.S.
- Died: December 21, 1937 (aged 48) New York City, U.S.
- Party: Republican
- Spouse: Harriet Blake (m. 1915)
- Children: 3
- Education: University of Minnesota (attended); Allegheny College (attended); Harvard University (BA)

George Edward Akerson (AYE-ker-son) (September 5, 1889 – December 21, 1937) was an American journalist and the first official White House Press Secretary, serving from 1929 to 1931 under President Herbert Hoover.

== Early life ==
George Edward Akerson was born in on September 5, 1889, in Minneapolis, Minnesota. His father was born in Sweden. Akerson's mother valued music education, and he studied piano. He graduated from Central High School, and was known for being "six feet tall, square-jawed and built like an oak tree".

After a brief stint at the University of Minnesota (where he felt that coursework too local and agricultural), he completed prerequisites at Allegheny College while saving money as the organist for a nearby Catholic church. In 1910, Akerson started at Harvard College. There he studied political science, was a member of the Phi Kappa Psi fraternity, and was nicknamed "Breeze" for his hurried walking speed. A newsletter from the fraternity described his university days: "His bulk attains an even 200 pounds, but it is carried easily because it is set on a powerful frame that moves quickly and readily."

Akerson met Harriet Blake, a first year student at Wellesley College, and they married on June 28, 1915, upon her graduation. They went on to have three sons. Explaining their connection, she said, "Well, we both loved the mountains. George had worked a couple of summers at Yellowstone. We had both been in the Rockies. We talked about them for hours at a time."

On summers home from Harvard, Akerson worked for the Minneapolis Tribune.

== Career ==
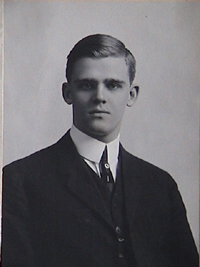
George Edward Akerson as a young man.

After his graduation, Akerson returned to the Minneapolis Tribune and as a full-time reporter from 1912 to 1925, serving as Washington correspondent in 1921 and then as managing editor in 1923.

While in Washington in the 1920s, Akerson advised the Republican Party on how to compete with the rising Nonpartisan League and Progressive movements in the Upper Midwest. That work brought Akerson to the attention of Herbert Hoover, who was then the Secretary of Commerce under Coolidge. Hoover had Akerson named as the secretary of the commission that ran the 1926 Sesquicentennial Exposition in Philadelphia, then hired Akerson as his private secretary.

Hoover and Akerson were together on a fishing trip in California when they learned that President Coolidge would not be running for re-election in 1928. They soon launched Hoover's campaign for the 1928 United States presidential election, with Akerson as newspaper liaison. "It was George who supplied the smile, the handshake, and the applesauce that the Hoover political cupboard was so bare before 1925," wrote The Outlook and Independent. The two men were noted for their physical resemblance, with Akerson at times receiving standing ovations from crowds that mistook him for Hoover. They campaigned for 15 months, from August 1927 to November 6, 1928. They visited Mississippi after the flood of 1927 to provide relief to the victims. In response to an accusation from Mississippi's governor that Herbert Hoover had danced with a black woman while visiting, Akerson said the claim was "the most indecent and unworthy statement in the whole of a bitter campaign."

== White House Press Secretary ==
Unlike previous presidential administrations, which employed just one secretary, Hoover named three secretaries on his first day in office, March 4, 1929. In addition to a personal secretary, he appointed one to handle mail, and a press secretary to communicate with the public as well as control visitors. Akerson became the first person to hold the role of press secretary, and was paid a salary of $10,000.

Each day Akerson held two meetings with reporters at 10 a.m. and 4 p.m., and managed visitors seeking appointments with the president. He facilitated Hoover's press conferences twice a week to answer written questions that had been submitted in advance." He attended events, such as the first demonstration of the television. According to a 1929 article, "it must be reckoned with carefully and even one trained in the newspaper field finds this to be a formidable job in itself."

Akerson kept a highly busy schedule and was called "Human Dynamo" and "Great Nordic Monsoon". In one instance, he reported being too busy to sit for his official portrait, despite being phoned seven times in a single day by the painter.

He was noted for his "genial blustering and his bountiful figure, and his loyalty to Hoover. "I’m good natured: but you show your hand or you don’t show your face." When a fire broke out during a children's holiday party on Christmas Eve 1929, Akerson crawled through a window to save items from an attic above the West Wing, which was "going up like brush wood". He was also noted for his piano skills and rapidly graying hair.

=== Resignation ===
In January 1931, Akerson resigned to take a $30,000 public relations role at Paramount Pictures (then Paramount-Publix) in Hollywood, California, whose president Adolph Zukor described Akerson as "a splendid example of manpower." Hoover announced on January 2, 1931: "Someone has offered him two or three times the pay the Government can afford, and he has responsibilities to his family that I cannot deny. I do greatly regret to lose an old friend out of my personal service." Hoover replaced him with Theodore Goldsmith Joslin.

== Later career and death ==
Akerson worked at Paramount for two years, then became the executive secretary of the National Code Authority of the Paper Distributing Trade.

In mid-November 1937, Akerson was hospitalized for kidney disease at the Rockefeller Institute in New York City. He died the following month, on December 22, 1937, at age 48. He was survived by his wife and three sons.

== Notes ==
Political offices
New office	White House Press Secretary; 1929–1931	Succeeded by Theodore Joslin
New office	White House Appointments Secretary; 1929–1931	Succeeded by Theodore Joslin
