= Theodore Joslin =

American politician (1890–1944)

Ted Joslin
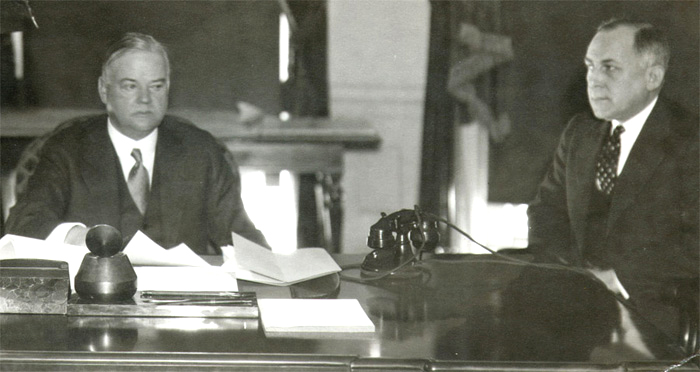
- Joslin (right) with President Hoover

2nd White House Press Secretary
- In office March 16, 1931 – March 4, 1933
- President: Herbert Hoover
- Preceded by: George E. Akerson
- Succeeded by: Stephen Early

White House Appointments Secretary
- In office March 16, 1931 – March 4, 1933
- President: Herbert Hoover
- Preceded by: George E. Akerson
- Succeeded by: Marvin H. McIntyre

Personal details
- Born: Theodore Goldsmith Joslin; February 28, 1890 Leominster, Massachusetts, U.S.
- Died: April 12, 1944 (aged 54) Wilmington, Delaware, U.S.
- Party: Republican
- Spouse: Rowena Hawes (m. 1913)
- Children: 2

Theodore Goldsmith Joslin (February 28, 1890 – April 12, 1944) was an American political reporter who served as the second ever White House Press Secretary from 1931 to 1933, under President Herbert Hoover. Joslin had previously worked as a political reporter. Following his tenure as White House Press Secretary, Joslin held executive positions at The News Journal newspaper in Wilmington, Delaware, and later at the DuPont chemical company as head of public relations.

== Background ==
Joslin was born in Leominster, Massachusetts, to Frederick A. and Hanna Hopgood Joslin. After graduating from high school, he took a job with the Boston bureau of the Associated Press, rising from office boy to correspondent. In 1913 he joined the staff of the Boston Evening Transcript. In 1916 the Evening Transcript sent him to its Washington, D.C. bureau, and he became chief correspondent in 1924. From 1916 to 1931 he was also on the staff of World’s Week and contributed to other magazines.

He married Rowena A. Hawes in 1913, and had two sons, Richard and Robert.

== White House Press Secretary ==
In March 1931 Joslin was appointed press secretary to President Herbert Hoover, replacing George E. Akerson, who had taken the blame for the president's deteriorating relations with the Washington press corps. Joslin held the post for two years, until Hoover left office in March 1933.

During his tenure as presidential press secretary, Joslin struggled to improve Hoover's public image. Hoover's distaste for the press and personal publicity, the collapse of the national economy in the Great Depression, and such public relations blunders as sending army troops on the Bonus Marchers in 1932, made it so Joslin did not accomplish this task. Joslin admired Hoover, and his diary recorded the president's conversations and other events inside the administration, as well as during Hoover's race for reelection, which he lost in a landslide to Franklin D. Roosevelt.

== Later life and death ==
After his White House tenure, he produced Washington reports for the statistician Roger Babson from 1933 to 1936. He then served as president of The News Journal Company of Wilmington, Delaware from 1936 to 1939. In 1939, he became director of public relations for the DuPont Company, holding that post until he died in his office of a heart attack.

After Hoover left office, Joslin published an expurgated version of the diary as Hoover Off the Record (1934). Much of what he omitted was later published by Timothy Walch and Dwight M. Miller in Herbert Hoover and Franklin D. Roosevelt: A Documentary History (1998). He died in 1944.

Political offices
Preceded by George E. Akerson	White House Press Secretary; 1931–1933	Succeeded by Stephen Early
Preceded by George E. Akerson	White House Appointments Secretary; 1931–1933	Succeeded by Marvin H. McIntyre
