= Jerald terHorst =

American journalist (1922–2010)

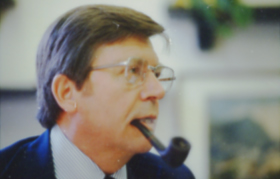
- terHorst in 1974

14th White House Press Secretary
- In office August 9, 1974 – September 8, 1974
- President: Gerald Ford
- Preceded by: Ron Ziegler
- Succeeded by: Ron Nessen

Personal details
- Born: Jerald Franklin terHorst; July 11, 1922 Grand Rapids, Michigan, U.S.
- Died: March 31, 2010 (aged 87) Asheville, North Carolina, U.S.
- Party: Republican
- Spouse: Louise Roth (m. 1945; died 2009)
- Education: Michigan State University (attended); University of Michigan, Ann Arbor (BA)

Military service
- Allegiance: United States
- Branch/service: United States Marine Corps
- Years of service: 1943–1946
- Battles/wars: World War II

Jerald Franklin terHorst (July 11, 1922 – March 31, 2010) was an American journalist who served as the 14th White House Press Secretary during the first month of Gerald Ford's presidency. His resignation in protest of Ford's unconditional pardon of former president Richard Nixon is still regarded as a rare act of conscience by a high-ranking public official.

== Early life and education ==
Jerald terHorst was born in Grand Rapids, Michigan, on July 11, 1922. The son of Dutch immigrants (hence the affix "ter"), he spoke Dutch as his first language. He did not speak English until he was 5 years old. He dropped out of high school in tenth grade to work on a dairy farm, but he returned to school when his high school principal persuaded him to graduate.

He went to Michigan State University on an agriculture scholarship and wrote for the school newspaper. His education was interrupted yet again when World War II broke out; he served in the United States Marine Corps from 1943 to 1946 in the Pacific theater. He finally finished his college education at the University of Michigan in 1947.

== Career ==
In the midst of the war, in 1945, he married Louise Roth, whom he had met at Michigan State University. She wrote for The Grand Rapids Herald; he wrote for The Grand Rapids Press, the Herald's rival, after graduation until 1951. He returned to active duty with the Marine Corps from 1951 until 1952 before going to write for The Detroit News, first in its Lansing bureau, then in the city room in Detroit.

In 1958 he was appointed as a correspondent in Washington, D.C. (1958–1960), eventually serving as bureau chief (1961–1974). On November 22, 1963, terHorst was in Dallas, Texas, riding in the motorcade during President John F. Kennedy's assassination.

=== White House Press Secretary ===
When he was appointed in August 1974 to serve as Ford's White House Press Secretary, he was a veteran journalist, respected member of the White House press corps, and an "old friend" of Gerald Ford's, whom he had known since Ford's first Congressional race in 1948; in fact, he was writing President Ford's biography at the time. The Detroit News allowed him to take a leave of absence to serve as Press Secretary.

He was applauded for "restoring openness and honesty to the White House" at a time when morale was low, after the Watergate scandal and the Nixon administration's deliberate misrepresentations.

=== Resignation ===
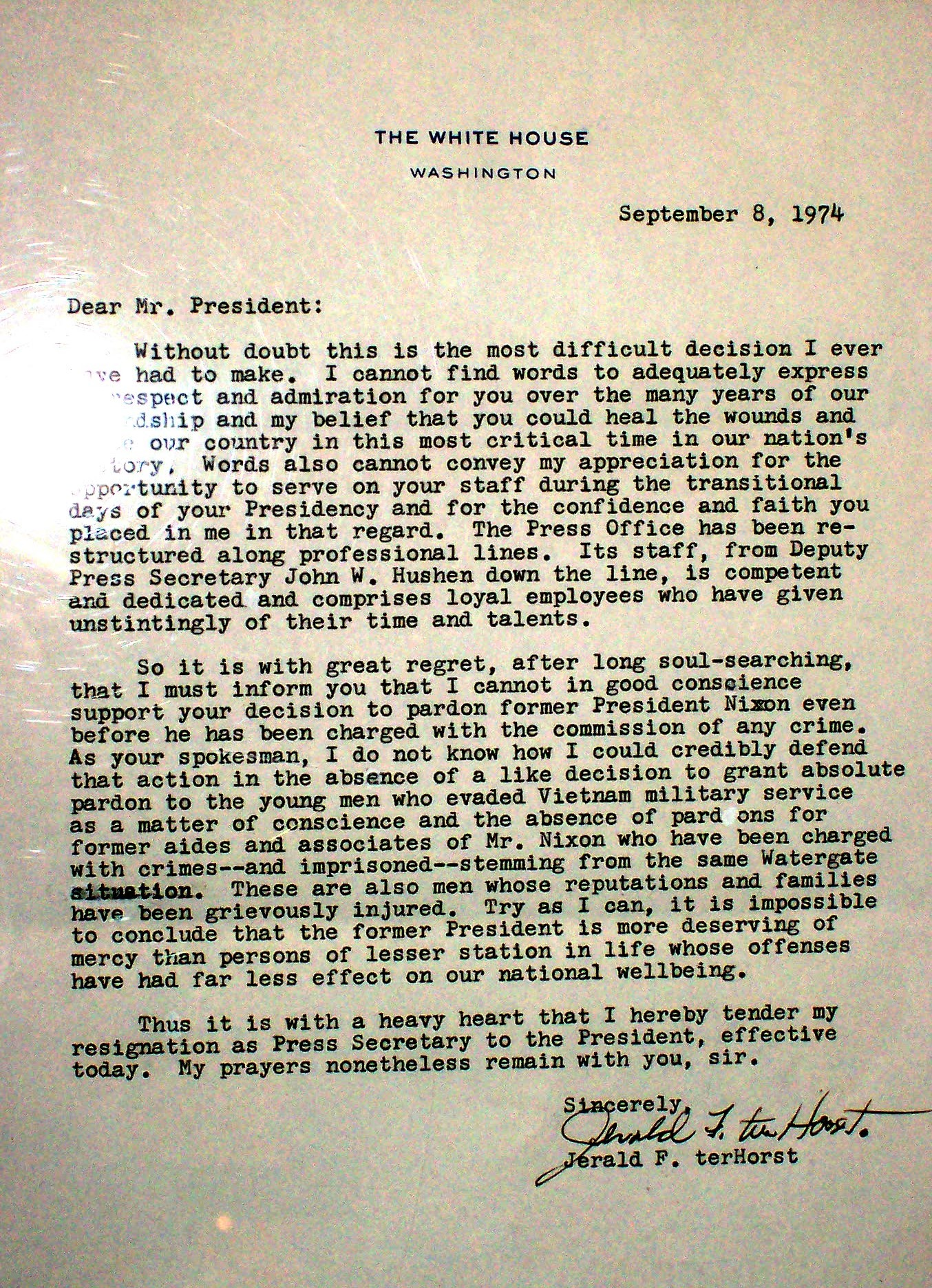
Jerald terHorst's letter of resignation

However, his stint as press secretary lasted only a month, from August 9 to September 8, 1974. He resigned in protest in the wake of President Ford's announcement that he would pardon former president Richard Nixon for any possible crimes connected with the Watergate scandal, Ford saying—as paraphrased by The New York Times—that "to pursue criminal charges against the former president would be detrimental to the interests of the country". At the time, the story that circulated was that terHorst had resigned because he had been blindsided by Ford's decision and because he had consistently denied to reporters in his daily press briefings that Ford had any intent of pardoning Nixon. Once the pardon was issued, the story went, terHorst felt that any credibility that he had earned with reporters had been undermined. Therefore, he handed in his resignation even before Ford went on the air.

TerHorst found the pardon especially unconscionable in light of Ford's refusal to pardon those who evaded the draft during the Vietnam War. His successor as Press Secretary was NBC reporter Ron Nessen, who served until the end of the Ford Administration.

=== Post-White House career ===
Shortly after his resignation, his book on President Ford, Gerald Ford and the Future of the Presidency, was published (with an epilogue about the circumstances leading up to terHorst's resignation). He was the first-ever recipient in 1975 of the Conscience-in-Media Award from the American Society of Journalists and Authors. He returned to The Detroit News as a national affairs columnist until 1981, when he joined the Ford Motor Company as their Washington, D.C. director of public affairs. He and Ralph D. Albertazzie, the pilot of Air Force One during the Nixon administration, co-authored The Flying White House: The Story of Air Force One (1979), a history of Air Force One—all seven aircraft—and presidential air travel in general. Albertazzie's Boeing 707, known as the "Spirit of '76," was the first jet to serve as the official Air Force One.

== Reflections ==
On November 12, 1999, terHorst appeared on a C-SPAN panel regarding Gerald Ford's pardon of Richard Nixon. The program was chaired by Professor Ken Gormley of Duquesne University, and hosted at Duquesne in Pittsburgh, Pennsylvania.

In the panel discussion, terHorst discussed why he was chosen by Ford, and his decision to resign as Ford's press secretary after the Nixon pardon. Other panelists included Robert Hartmann, White House Counsel during the Ford administration; Benton Becker, Special Counsel to Ford who negotiated the wording and acceptance of Nixon's pardon; and Herbert Miller, Nixon's personal attorney during the conclusion of the Watergate scandal. Ron Ziegler, Nixon's own press secretary, was scheduled to appear via telephone hookup, but failed to connect; Ford's third son, Steven Ford, joined the panel briefly to participate in its conclusion. This was re-broadcast January 6, 2007, as a segment of Contemporary History on C-SPAN 3 as part of their public affairs programming in the wake of Ford's death.

In the end, terHorst agreed with the rest of the panel's assessment that the Nixon pardon was granted to end the drain on White House resources (rather than as any part of a covert deal Nixon made with Ford before resigning). He pointed out, however, that the Vietnam War was also a "searing ordeal" and was a significant drain on the administration at the time, yet Ford did not act to heal that wound with the haste Ford evinced in moving the Nixon matter off the national agenda.

Although other panelists expressed retroactive support for the pardon, terHorst disagreed: "I would still say I am exactly where I was 25 years ago, that it set up a double standard of justice" in which Nixon was granted highly favorable treatment in comparison to his co-conspirators or the men who had evaded the Vietnam War draft.

== Personal life and death ==
TerHorst was married to Louise Roth terHorst for 64 years, from 1945 until her death in 2009. terHorst died at age 87 of congestive heart failure in his apartment in Asheville, North Carolina, on March 31, 2010. He was survived by his four children, Peter, Karen, Margaret and Martha, and by eight grandchildren.

Political offices
Preceded by Ron Ziegler	White House Press Secretary; 1974	Succeeded by Ron Nessen
