= Marvin H. McIntyre =

Marvin McIntyre
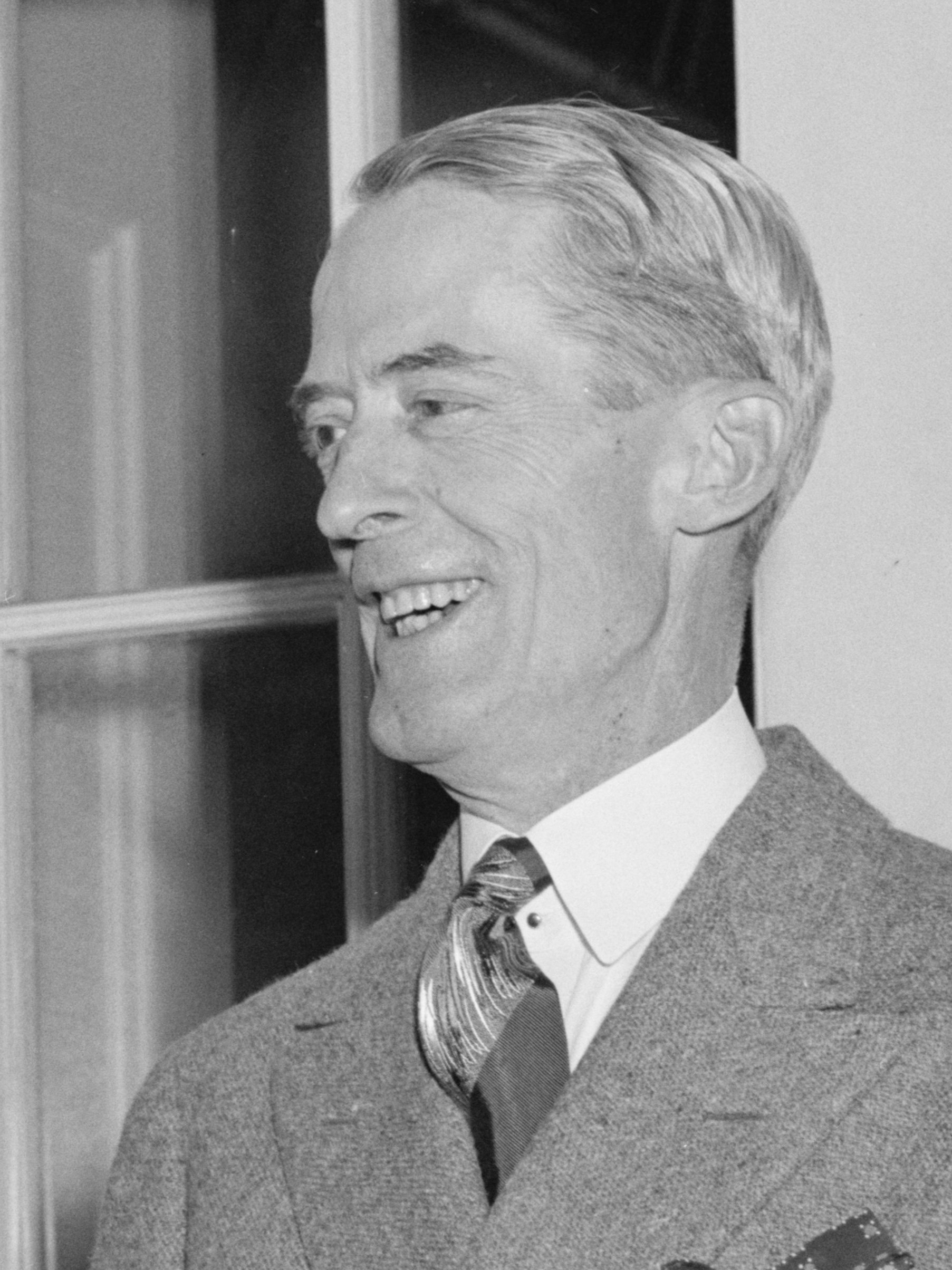

Correspondence Secretary to the President
- In office 1941–1943
- President: Franklin D. Roosevelt
- Preceded by: James Roosevelt II (as Secretary to the President)
- Succeeded by: William D. Hassett

White House Appointments Secretary
- In office 1933–1938
- President: Franklin D. Roosevelt
- Preceded by: Ted Joslin
- Succeeded by: Pa Watson

Personal details
- Born: Marvin Hunter McIntyre; November 27, 1878 La Grange, Kentucky, U.S.
- Died: December 13, 1943 (aged 65) Washington, D.C., U.S.
- Party: Democratic
- Education: Vanderbilt University (BA)

Marvin Hunter McIntyre (November 27, 1878 – December 13, 1943) was an American journalist and Presidential Secretary to President Franklin D. Roosevelt (FDR).

== Biography ==
McIntyre was born in La Grange, Kentucky, 27 November 1878 and was educated at the Wall and Mooney Preparatory school in Franklin, Tennessee, and at Vanderbilt University.

Beginning his career in 1905 in journalism, he rose to city editor of The Washington Post. In 1909 he became the editor of the Washington Times. He left this post in 1917 to become Special Assistant to Josephus Daniels, Secretary of the Navy, who was an old friend and to serve as a member of the Committee on Public Information under George Creel and as Chief of the Press Offices of the Navy Department during the First World War. It was during this time McIntyre first met Roosevelt, then Assistant Secretary of the Navy.

He served as publicity representative and business manager for several of FDR's campaigns. In 1920 when FDR ran for vice president with James M. Cox, the Democrat's presidential nominee, McIntyre shared day-to-day campaign responsibilities with Steven T. Early. After the Democratic defeat in 1920, he remained in Washington DC, contributing articles to Army and Navy Journals and later becoming representative of the Pathé News Reel Company. He stayed in the motion picture business until 1931 when the Roosevelt-for-President drive began to gather momentum and FDR, then Governor of New York, called McIntyre to join him in Albany to start plans for the campaign. During 1932 McIntyre traveled with FDR as his Press Officer.

When FDR was inaugurated on March 4, 1933, he appointed McIntyre an assistant secretary in charge of appointments. In addition to these duties McIntyre served as traveling secretary. The story goes that the day after FDR's inauguration, Roosevelt had an early breakfast, had wheeled himself into his new office, and was ready to work. But alone in the room, he found his desk had no pencil, no pad and no buzzer to summon anyone. He was said to have given a mighty shout. From adjacent rooms McIntyre and Marguerite (Missy) LeHand, FDR's personal secretary, responded. Thus, McIntyre can be said to have been there from the beginning of the Roosevelt administration.

Historian Arthur Schlesinger, Jr. described McIntyre and his co-worker Early, also an assistant secretary, as being "aggressively non-ideological:" Both men's loyalty was to FDR rather than to his political philosophy. Both preferred old school business and political types "to the odd new breed of New Dealers." Both men focused on their job and attempted to avoid getting caught up in policy questions. As the assistant secretary in charge of appointments, McIntyre worked with Edwin M. Watson (Pa), FDR's military aide who ran his general appointments schedule. It was a challenge because FDR liked to set meetings at 15 minute intervals and often ran behind as visitors waited. McIntyre was described as soft-spoken, gentle, and agreeable. Watson, who also was soft-spoken, was said to have a "bubbling good nature," but also was said to be devastingly astute at detecting phonies.

On 1 July 1937, McIntyre became the President's Appointments Secretary until 1938 when illness prevented him from carrying out his duties. He returned to the White House in 1941 assuming duties as the President's Correspondence Secretary. McIntyre was at the White House on the afternoon of December 7, 1941, as FDR was receiving the dismal news concerning the Pearl Harbor attack. Notably, he sat in on a meeting that FDR had called for 3 p.m. that included Secretary of War, Henry L. Stimson, Secretary of the Navy, Frank Knox, Captain John R. Beardall, naval aid, and perhaps Roosevelt's closest presidential aid Harry L. Hopkins. Also in attendance were Steve T. Early, FDR's press secretary and Grace G. Tully, FDR's private secretary, who had succeeded Marguerite LeHand in 1941 and was among those closest to Roosevelt having been with the family throughout the Albany years. McIntyre remained in the position of the President's Correspondence Secretary, and according to FDR speech writer Robert E. Sherwood was "particularly valuable as a contact man between the White House and Capitol Hill", until his death on 13 December 1943, in Washington, D.C. McIntyre was succeeded by William D. Hassett, whom FDR named to fill the vacant post of Secretary to the president on February 19, 1944. Hassett's appointment extended McIntyre's legacy because Hassett had come to the White House on McIntyre's recommendation in September, 1935 and had been a reporter that McIntyre knew from the Navy press room when FDR had been Assistant Secretary of the Navy.

He was a colonel in the Kentucky Guard.

== Legacy ==
The World War II Haskell-class attack transport USS Marvin H. McIntyre (APA-129) was named in his honor.

Political offices
Preceded by Ted Joslin	White House Appointments Secretary; 1933–1938	Succeeded by Pa Watson
