= Ron Nessen =

American government official (1934–2025)

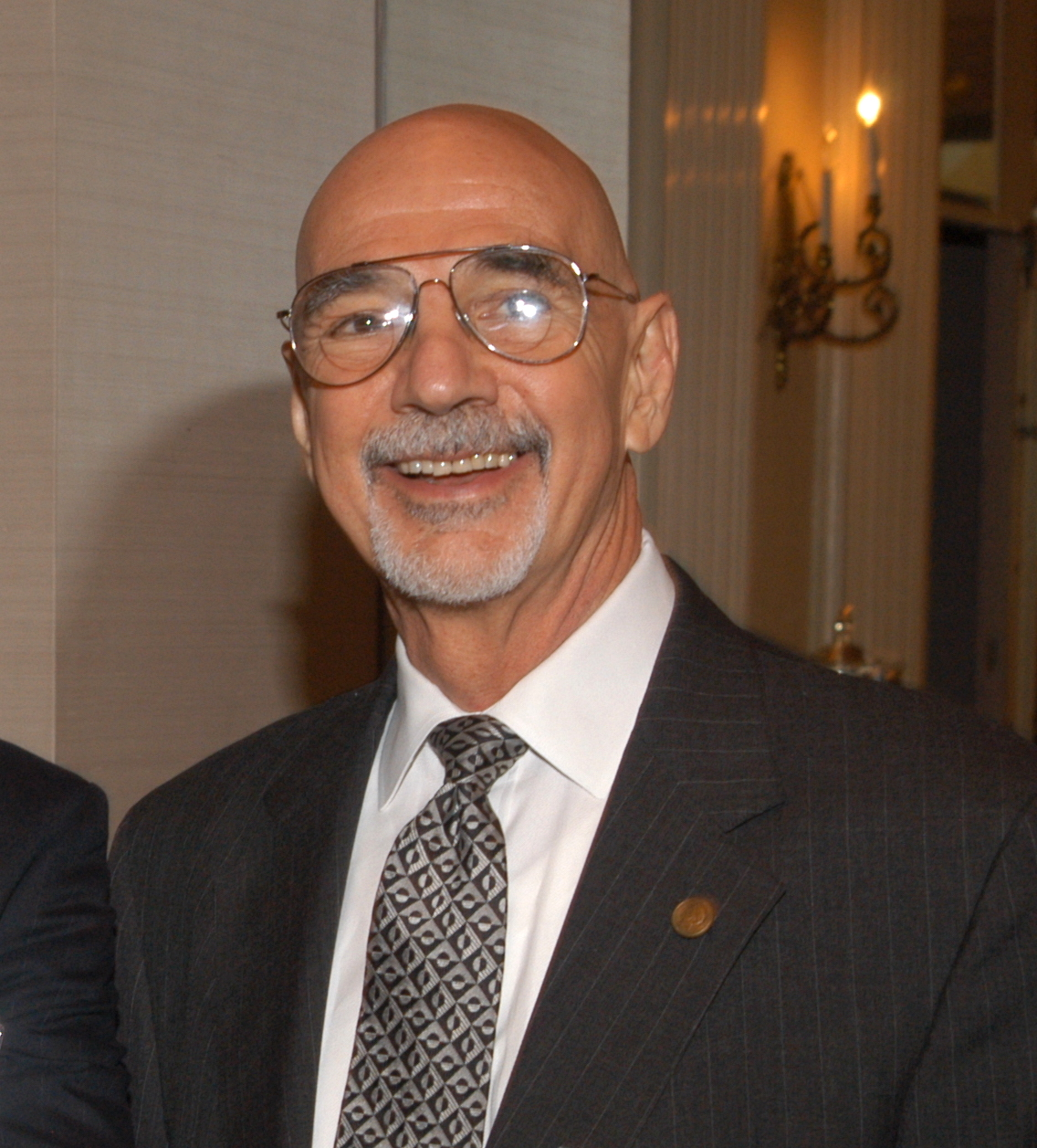
- Nessen in 2004

15th White House Press Secretary
- In office September 9, 1974 – January 20, 1977
- President: Gerald Ford
- Preceded by: Jerald terHorst
- Succeeded by: Jody Powell

Personal details
- Born: Ronald Harold Nessen; May 25, 1934 Rockville, Maryland, U.S.
- Died: March 12, 2025 (aged 90) Bethesda, Maryland, U.S.
- Party: Republican
- Spouses: Sandra Frey (m. 1954, divorced); Young Hi Song (m. 1967; div. 1981); Johanna Newman (m. 1988, divorced)
- Children: 3
- Education: Shepherd University (attended); American University (BA)

Ronald Harold Nessen (May 25, 1934 – March 12, 2025) was an American government official and journalist who served as the 15th White House Press Secretary for President Gerald Ford from 1974 to 1977. He replaced Jerald terHorst, who resigned in the wake of President Ford's pardon of former president Richard Nixon.

== Early life ==
Nessen was born in Rockville, Maryland, on May 25, 1934, the son of Ida Edith (Kaufman) and Frederick Edward Nessen, who owned a variety store. He grew up in the Shepherd Park area of Washington, D.C., and was educated at Calvin Coolidge High School before going on to graduate from American University.

== Career ==
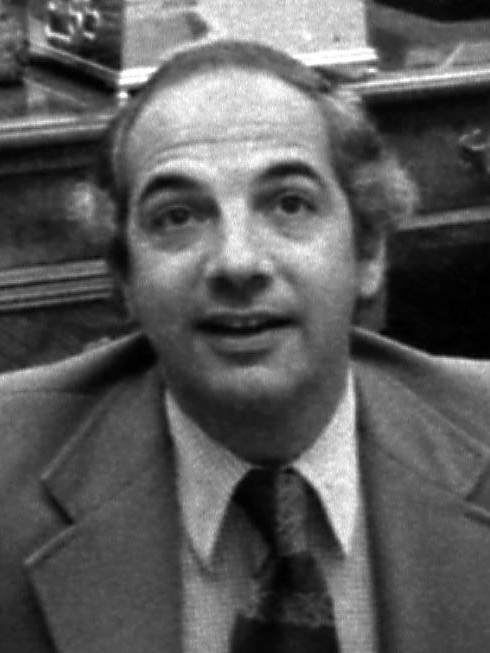
Nessen in 1975

Nessen began his career as a journalist, starting at Maryland's Montgomery County Sentinel before moving onto United Press and NBC News. Serving as a war correspondent for NBC News during the Vietnam War, he was seriously wounded by grenade fragments while on patrol outside Pleiku in the Central Highlands in July 1966. He was with cameraman Peter Boultwood when he was wounded.Nessen returned to the US and was treated at the Walter Reed Army Hospital in 1966 On the day of Ford's succession to the presidency, August 9, 1974, he provided commentary. That evening he was on the NBC Nightly News; in that piece, Nessen reported on the appointment of Jerald terHorst, the man whom he would succeed one month later, serving until the end of the Ford administration in January 1977.

On April 17, 1976, Nessen was the first political figure to host Saturday Night Live, doing so in the midst of the election race. He had encountered Al Franken when campaigning in New Hampshire and the suggestion came about hosting the show. While President Ford did not want to host the show, he suggested Nessen could host. Ford did contribute pre-recorded bits, most notably opening the show with the "Live from New York, it's Saturday night!" tagline. Nessen later labeled his appearance as a "failure", and the President later stated to him that the show was a mixed bag of funny and distasteful (reportedly, cast members stated they included offensive items specifically because they knew Ford was watching). On a previous episode, Nessen was portrayed by Buck Henry.

Nessen also served as host of WTTG's long-running news program "Panorama" and later headed the news department at the Mutual Broadcasting System, adding oversight of NBC Radio News under its corporate successor Westwood One.

Nessen was a member of the Peabody Awards Board of Jurors from 1996 to 2003, and served as Chair in 2003.

== Personal life and death ==
Nessen married Sandra Frey in 1954; they had two children, one of whom died at age five, and later divorced. In 1967, he married Young Hi Song, with whom he had a son before divorcing in 1981. A 1988 marriage to fellow journalist Johanna Neuman also ended in divorce.

Nessen died in Bethesda, Maryland, on March 12, 2025, at the age of 90.

== Works ==
- It Sure Looks Different from the Inside. Playboy Press. 1978. ISBN 978-0-87223-500-7.
- The First Lady. Playboy Press. 1979. ISBN 978-0-87223-537-3.
- The Hour. Morrow. 1984. ISBN 978-0-688-01918-1.
- Death with Honors. Tom Doherty Associates, LLC. 21 October 1999. ISBN 978-0-8125-7791-4.
- Press Corpse. Tom Doherty Associates, LLC. May 1997. ISBN 978-0-8125-6793-9.
- Knight and Day. Forge. 1995. ISBN 978-0-312-85588-8.

Political offices
| Preceded by Jerald terHorst | White House Press Secretary; 1974–1977 | Succeeded by Jody Powell |
