= Idar D. Rimestad =

American administrator and ambassador

Idar Rimestad (August 7, 1916 – February 13, 2003 in San Diego, California) was an American administrator with the federal government and ambassador to the United Nations European office in Geneva from 1969 until his retirement in 1973. Before entering the Foreign Service in the 1950s, Rimestad was an administrator with the National Youth Administration, War Department and the Atomic Energy Commission. Lyndon B. Johnson appointed him deputy undersecretary of state for administration in 1967.

A native of Alsen, North Dakota, he graduated from the University of North Dakota.
