= White House Press Secretary =

Senior White House official

- Incumbent; Vacant since October 16, 2026
- White House Office of the Press Secretary
- Appointer: President of the United States
- Formation: March 4, 1929; 97 years ago
- First holder: George E. Akerson
- Salary: $195,200 (2026)
- Website: https://www.whitehouse.gov/briefings-statements/

The White House press secretary is a senior White House official whose primary responsibility is to act as spokesperson for the executive branch of the United States federal government, especially with regard to the president, senior aides and executives, as well as government policies.

The press secretary is responsible for collecting information about actions and events within the president's administration and issues the administration's reactions to developments around the world. The press secretary interacts with the media and the White House press corps on a daily basis, generally in a daily press briefing. The press secretary serves by the appointment and at the pleasure of the president of the United States; the office does not require the advice and consent of the United States Senate; however, because of the frequent briefings given to the global media, who in turn inform the public, the position is a prominent non-Cabinet post.

Katie Zacharia is the most recent White House press secretary, but the position has been vacant since October 16, 2026 after Zacharia's firing four days after taking the position.

== History ==
=== Early press relations ===
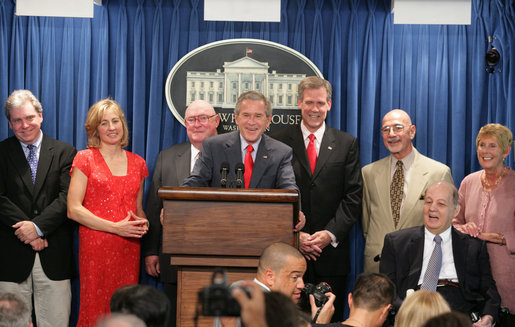
In August 2006, President George W. Bush hosted seven White House press secretaries before the James S. Brady Press Briefing Room underwent renovation. From left, Joe Lockhart, Dee Dee Myers, Marlin Fitzwater, Bush, Tony Snow, Ron Nessen, and James Brady (seated) with his wife Sarah Brady.

In the United States' early years, there was no single designated staff person or office responsible for managing the relationship between the president and the growing number of journalists and media entities that were covering him. It was not until after President Abraham Lincoln's administration that Congress formally appropriated funds for a White House staff, which at first consisted merely of a secretary. Ulysses S. Grant's White House staff officially numbered six people at a cost of $13,800, though he supplemented with personnel from the War Department. Fifty years later under the Coolidge administration, the staff had increased to just fewer than fifty people at a cost of nearly $100,000.

As presidents increasingly hired more staff, some showed a tendency to pick aides and confidantes who had backgrounds in journalism. One of Abraham Lincoln's private secretaries, John G. Nicolay, had been an editor and owner of a newspaper in Illinois before he worked for the president in the White House. While the modern equivalent of a private or personal secretary to the president of the United States would be more narrowly concerned with the care and feeding of the president, the small size of the White House staff at that point meant that Nicolay interacted with the press occasionally in carrying out his duties. He was occasionally asked to verify stories or information that various members of the press had heard. Though the title and establishment of the roles and responsibilities of the press secretary job was still decades in the future, the small and growing White House staff was increasingly interacting with a growing number of professional journalists and mass media entities covering the president and the White House. Andrew Johnson was the first president to grant a formal interview request to a reporter, sitting down with Col. Alexander K. McClure from Pennsylvania. Although various presidents and reporters had participated in conversations or dialogues prior to Johnson, the exchanges had been less formal.

=== Cleveland and McKinley administrations ===
Prior to the 1880s and the presidency of Grover Cleveland, the relationship between the president, his administration, and the small but growing number of newspapers covering him was such that there was little need for a formal plan or designated spokesperson to manage it. The relationship between government and the press was not as inherently adversarial and arms length as in modern times. In fact, prior to the establishment of the U.S. Government Printing Office (GPO), some newspapers were awarded contracts to print government publications and often supported the president in exchange. For example, the Gazette of the United States won an early U.S. Treasury contract and was supportive of President George Washington. In general, though coverage of the president could be harsh and opinionated, newspapers were to some degree extensions of the political party apparatus and subsequently not seen as entities requiring specific, sustained management by the White House or administration.

The media had changed significantly by 1884, when Grover Cleveland was elected as president of the United States. Between 1776 and 1884, the United States had quadrupled geographically and increased in population from 2.5 million to 56 million. The number of newspaper publications in active circulation had increased from 37 to more than 1,200 dailies, in addition to the many new monthly magazines. The rapid growth in journalism as a booming industry resulted in an increase in reporters covering the activities of the president.

Grover Cleveland married 21-year-old Frances Folsom in 1886. The growing number of reporters and the increasing aggressiveness of their style of coverage led to frustrations when the president and his new bride were unable to rid themselves of reporters who followed them to their honeymoon in Deer Park, Maryland. President Cleveland relied on his private secretary, Daniel Lamont, who had once been an editor of the Albany Argus, to keep the reporters at bay. The controversy surrounding coverage of the trip resulted in a public debate about the balance between the right of the president and his family to privacy and the role of the press in covering the country's most public figure. In an editorial, the New York World defended the right of the press to cover the president at all times:

The idea of offending the bachelor sensitiveness of President Cleveland or the maidenly reserve of his bride has been far from anybody's thought...We must insist that the President is public property; that it is perfectly legitimate to send correspondents and reporters to follow him when he goes on a journey, and to keep watch over him and his family.

=== White House press corps ===
At the end of the Cleveland administration, a new feature of press coverage of the White House materialized. William W. Price, a southern reporter, auditioned for a job at the Washington Evening Star by stationing himself at the White House to seek out stories. He interviewed guests coming and going from meetings or events with the president and ultimately reported a story in a piece carrying the headline "At the White House". Competitor newspapers responded by sending their own reporters to cover the White House in a daily, sustained way and soon the White House had reporters dedicated to covering the "White House beat". Some point to this as the early origins of a more formal White House Press Corps.

When President Cleveland was elected to a second, non-consecutive term in 1893, George B. Cortelyou, formally trained as a stenographer, was named confidential stenographer at the White House and later named executive clerk. Though he was not given the formal title of private secretary to the president until later and the term press secretary had not yet been conceived, Cortelyou was highly respected by the press and William McKinley's biographer, Margaret Leach, called Cortelyou "the first of the presidential press secretaries". President Cleveland's successor, William McKinley, kept Cortelyou on during the transition and later formally named him private secretary to the president, though he had been informally doing the job for some time prior. Under McKinley, Cortelyou became notable for his popularity with journalists covering the White House. The correspondents relied on him for information and his tenure as private secretary was noteworthy for some of the same working traits modern press secretaries have become popular for, including providing information to reporters later in the evening if events had transpired in the afternoon, offering advance copies of remarks prepared for the president, and ensuring reporters received transcripts of unprepared remarks made by the president while traveling, which were recorded by a stenographer. Cortelyou also circulated noteworthy stories to the president and other staffers (by this point the White House staff numbered approximately 18), which is similar to the exhaustive news summaries formally distributed to the White House staff in the modern era. The nascent press corps' appreciation for Cortelyou's responsiveness is similar to how a modern White House press secretary's responsiveness to the press corps can shape their positive or negative view of him or her.

=== Working space in the White House for the press corps ===
The White House "beat" concept that had been started during the Cleveland administration by reporter William Price was continued during the McKinley administration. Around the time of the outbreak of the Spanish–American War in 1898, the reporters covering the White House were invited into the mansion itself and provided with space to write, conduct interviews, and generally cover the White House. Now reporting from inside the White House, the reporters used their new location to interview guests entering or leaving the White House or confirm pieces of information from the president's secretaries as they passed through in the course of their duties. Reporters working in the White House did, however, honor an unspoken rule and refrain from asking the president himself a question if he happened to walk through their working area.

The long-term presence of the White House Press Corps in the White House was cemented by Theodore Roosevelt, who asked that planners include permanent space for the press corps in the executive office building now called the West Wing, which he had ordered built in the early 1900s. It is the West Wing that ultimately housed the Office of the Press Secretary and the now-famous James S. Brady Press Briefing Room, which was renovated by the George W. Bush administration in 2007.

=== Woodrow Wilson administration ===
When Woodrow Wilson was elected governor of New Jersey in 1910, he asked Joseph P. Tumulty to serve as his private secretary. When he was elected president two years later, he brought Tumulty with him to the White House, where Tumulty served as private secretary to the president. As private secretary, Tumulty dealt extensively with the press. At the outset of the administration, Tumulty convinced Wilson, who was known for his distaste of the press, to hold news conferences on a regularized schedule, sometimes as much as twice every week. During the first such news conference, over one hundred reporters crowded into Wilson's office to ask him questions. Wilson often requested that reporters not publish answers given in these settings and on one occasion threatened to cancel the news conferences when a reporter revealed comments he had given regarding Mexico. The press conferences were later discontinued after the sinking of British liner Lusitania, and despite attempts to revive them during his second term were held only sporadically during Wilson's final years in office.

Joseph Tumulty also put into place a more regular schedule of briefing the press. He gave daily briefings to the press in the morning, which were attended by as many as thirty reporters. By formalizing the press briefing process, Tumulty laid the groundwork for what would later be called the White House Press Briefing. Tumulty also worked to clarify embargo rules for the press, ordering that the exact time a press embargo was lifted be noted on the confidential information that was being released.

=== Calvin Coolidge and Herbert Hoover administrations ===
Despite being nicknamed "Silent Cal", many reporters covering the White House found President Calvin Coolidge to be fairly accessible once he took office in 1923 following the death of President Warren G. Harding. During his over five years in office, Coolidge held approximately 520 press conferences, which averaged out to nearly 8 per month. The term "White House spokesman" was used extensively for the first time during the Coolidge administration, as press conference rules mandated that reporters could attribute quotes or statements only to a "White House spokesman" and not directly to the president himself. Former Associated Press editor W. Dale Nelson suggests that this practice was a precursor to the more modern use of "senior administration official" offering statements or quotes not directly attributable to a specific person, which was used frequently by Henry Kissinger during the Nixon administration.

When Herbert Hoover assumed the presidency in 1929, he brought his longtime aide George E. Akerson to Washington with him as his private secretary. Akerson did not have the formal title of "press secretary", but was the designated person to speak on behalf of President Hoover. Hoover asked the White House Correspondents Association to form a committee to discuss matters pertaining to coverage of the White House and formalized news conferences, dividing presidential news into three different categories:

- Announcements directly attributable to the president of the United States,
- Statements attributable to official sources, but not to the president himself, and
- Background information for the reporter's knowledge but not specifically attributable to the president nor the White House

George Akerson continued the tradition of meeting daily with reporters, and though usually of jovial temperament, was not known for the precision that was the hallmark of some of his predecessors, such as Cortelyou. On one occasion, he incorrectly stated that sitting Supreme Court justice Harlan Stone had been elevated to be chief justice, only to have to issue a statement later that the actual nominee was Charles Evans Hughes. Akerson also struggled at times with his role in a growing White House staff. Akerson was one of three secretaries to the president, and some speculated that Hoover's closeness to his other secretary, Lawrence Richey, a former detective and Secret Service agent, made it difficult for Akerson to obtain the kind of information he needed to effectively do his job. As poor coverage made President Hoover appear detached and out of touch amidst a worsening depression, Richey and Akerson disagreed about the most effective press strategy, with Akerson promoting the idea that Hoover should leverage the increasingly influential platform of radio, and Richey arguing that the radio strategy was not worthy of the presidency. Akerson resigned not long thereafter, and Theodore Joslin, a former reporter, was named as the new secretary. Relations between the Hoover administration and the press continued to decline.

=== Roosevelt administration, Steve Early, and the first "White House press secretary" ===
During the administration of presidency of Franklin D. Roosevelt, journalist Stephen Early became the first White House secretary charged only with press responsibilities. The manner in which Early approached his portfolio and increasingly high-profile nature of the job have led many to state that Early is the first true White House press secretary, both in function and in formal title. Prior to joining the Roosevelt campaign and administration Early had served as an editor to the military paper Stars and Stripes and as a reporter for the Associated Press. When Roosevelt was nominated on James Cox's ticket as the vice presidential nominee in 1920, he asked Early to serve as an advance representative. As an advance representative, Early traveled ahead of the campaign, arranged for logistics and attempted to promote positive coverage for the candidates.

When President Roosevelt won the presidency in 1932, he chose Early to be his secretary responsible for handling the press, or as the role was becoming known, "the press secretary". After accepting the job, Early laid out for Roosevelt his vision of how the role should be conducted. He requested having unfettered access to the president, having his quotes and statements directly attributable to him as press secretary, and offering as much factual information to the press as it became available. He also convinced Roosevelt to agree to twice-weekly presidential press conferences, with the timing of each tailored to the different deadline schedules of the White House Press Corps. Early also made himself available to the press corps as often as he could, and though he was not known for a lighthearted or amiable demeanor, he earned a reputation for responsiveness and openness, even having his own telephone number listed unlike some of those who held the job after him.

Despite the unpopularity of press conferences by the end of the Hoover administration, Roosevelt continued the tradition. He did away with written questions submitted in advance and mandated that nothing he said in press conferences could be attributed to him or the White House, but was instead intended for reporters' general background information. Many reporters found this helpful as it allowed the president to be forthright and candid in his assessments and answers their questions. Unlike some of his predecessors who filled the role, Early routinely prepared Roosevelt for press conferences, bringing the president's attention to issues that might come up, suggesting the appropriate answers, and even planting questions or issues with certain reporters. Press conferences also began a tradition where the senior wire reporter concludes the session by stating, "Thank you, Mr. President", signaling that the time for questioning is over, a tradition that continues today. Roosevelt held well over 300 press conferences during his first term.

Though some reporters were unsatisfied with the amount of real news or new information they were getting from the press conferences, the Roosevelt administration under Early's leadership was considered by many to be effective at managing the White House's relationship with the press. During the administration, U.S. News reported that "The machinery for getting and giving the news runs about as smoothly as could be wished from either side."

The Roosevelt White House was also marked by a significant increase in the number of White House staff supporting the president and bureaucracy in general, largely as a result of increased New Deal funding. Early was criticized at times for attempting to closely manage press officers at various department and agencies across the government, and gave out a number of such jobs to journalists who he knew, instead of party loyalists who had traditionally received such appointments. A congressional investigation several years later revealed that across government, fewer than 150 employees were engaged in public relations along with an additional 14 part-time workers. This is a significant increase given that White House staff numbered at 11 in total when Roosevelt took office.

Early was involved in Roosevelt taking advantage of the radio medium through his fireside chats, an idea some say he got from George Akerson who had unsuccessfully tried to convince President Hoover to do something similar. Early also came under fire for the rules surrounding African American journalists not being allowed to attend presidential press conferences. Some have said that Early used enforcement of the standing rule, which had been to only allow regular Washington journalists to attend the press conferences, to deny press conference access to black reporters. Since many if not most black publications at the time were weeklies, they were restricted as a result of the rules. When African American reporters from daily publications requested access to the conferences, Early reportedly told them to seek accreditation from Capitol Hill press officers, which was another sometimes insurmountable challenge. African American reporters did not gain formal approval to attend White House news conferences until 1944.

Early's tenure as press secretary was also marked by stringent restrictions on photographers, largely aimed at hiding the severity of FDR's polio and worsening immobility. Photographers were not permitted to be closer than 12 feet (3.7 m) of FDR, or 30 feet (9.1 m) in larger events.

As a result of the increasingly high-profile nature of the job and Early's sole responsibility of managing the White House press operations, it was during the Roosevelt administration that Early and the position he held began to be formally referred to as the press secretary. As a result, many point to Steve Early as the first White House press secretary.

=== Eisenhower administration, James Hagerty, press secretary role evolves ===
As a candidate for president, Dwight D. Eisenhower tapped James Hagerty, a former reporter for the New York Times, to be his press secretary. Hagerty had previously been press secretary for New York governor Thomas E. Dewey during his two tries for the presidency. After he won election, Eisenhower appointed Hagerty to be White House press secretary.

Hagerty's experience as a journalist helped him perform his role more effectively: "Having spent years as a reporter on the other side of the news barrier, he was not blinded to the reporter's dependence on deadlines, transmission facilities, prompt texts of speeches and statements and the frequent necessity of having to ask seemingly irrelevant and inconsequential questions", wrote John McQuiston in the New York Times".

At Hagerty's first meeting with White House reporters on January 21, 1953, he laid down ground rules that are still largely a model for how the press secretary operates. He said:

I would like to say to you fellows that I am not going to play any favorites, and I'm not going to give out any exclusive stories about the president or the White House.

When I say to you, 'I don't know,' I mean I don't know. When I say, 'No comment,' it means I'm not talking, but not necessarily any more than that.

Aside from that, I'm here to help you get the news. I am also here to work for one man, who happens to be the president. And I will do that to the best of my ability.

The practice of regularly scheduled presidential news conference was instituted during the Eisenhower administration. Hagerty abolished the longstanding rule that the president could not be directly quoted without permission—for the first time, everything that the president said at a press conference could be printed verbatim.

In 1955, during the Eisenhower administration, newsreel and television cameras were allowed in presidential news conferences for the first time.

When President Eisenhower suffered a heart attack in Denver in September 1955, and underwent abdominal surgery the following year, Hagerty brought news to the nation in a calm and professional manner. "His performances in both crises won him more respect from newsmen than any presidential press secretary in memory", said a New York Times writer.

Hagerty remained press secretary for eight years, still the record for longest time served in that position. Eisenhower grew to trust Hagerty to such a degree that the role of press secretary was elevated to that of a senior advisor to the president.

=== Kennedy and (early) Johnson administrations: Pierre Salinger ===
Pierre Salinger, who had served as press secretary for John F. Kennedy's 1960 presidential campaign, would be appointed as the next White House Press Secretary following the election. Salinger would himself appoint Andrew Hatcher, who would be the first Black Assistant Press Secretary.

In December 1960, Salinger proposed that the President's press conferences be broadcast on live television: Kennedy himself was uncertain about this, primarily due to concerns about overexposure and pushback from print media journalists, though he allowed Salinger to meet with networks to develop the policy. Kennedy's designated advisors, especially Secretary of State-designate Dean Rusk, feared that slips of the tongue could result in international incidents, although the policy would ultimately be adopted. Later, in January 1961, he would also make many other revisions to policies established by Hagerty, including cancelling a policy that required reporters to identify their affiliations out loud prior to asking questions, due to him feeling that it provided media outlets with unnecessary advertisement. He also ended the press office's practice of screening phone calls by reporters seeking to interview presidential aides, though this had the side effect of leading to interviews with Kennedy that Salinger was unaware of until they had already happened.

Salinger was the first press secretary to be given the task of determining presidential information release policies. Despite advocating for an "open [news] beat," Salinger would controversially establish tight systems of control over information released to the public. Kennedy would publicly defend these policies during a conference on January 25, 1961, citing national security as a defense. Salinger himself would face difficulty because of this in April 1961, when he was unable to provide details about the ill-fated Bay of Pigs invasion and was instructed to state that he was only aware of what he had been reading in the newspapers. He was not given any other information. Even more controversy would result due to Kennedy's public statements afterward implying that he was seeking to impose "tests of national security" onto media outlets similar to those during World War II during peacetime. Similarly, First Lady Jacqueline Kennedy would maintain an even tighter control over her press coverage, referring to female journalists as "harpies" while commending Salinger for handling the task, referring to herself as "the greatest cross you have to bear."

When Kennedy was assassinated on November 22, 1963, Salinger was flying to Japan from Honolulu on a plane as part of a mission led by Rusk. Kennedy's death was announced by Vice President Lyndon B. Johnson at the Dallas Love Field airport, where Air Force One was located, with Johnson assuming the presidency that day: further information would not be released until that night by the White House's press office: by the time Salinger finally returned to the White House, he would go home shortly after due to there being very little work being left for him to do.

Johnson and Salinger were personally amicable, with the latter being relieved at the significantly decreased levels of information security early on, especially regarding First Lady Lady Bird Johnson. Professionally, however, Salinger was off-putted by Johnson's behaviors, which he viewed as unsuited for television compared to Kennedy, including the President's outbursts at reporters; very short notice being given for the FDR-inspired Oval Office press meetings meant to replace press conferences; a disastrous March 1964 television interview; and Johnson's habits of meeting with Cabinet officials while the former was using the toilet. Ultimately, Salinger resigned in March 1964 due to being unable to disassociate the position from his time under Kennedy in favor of running for the U.S. Senate seat held by Clair Engle (D-CA), who would die in July that year. Salinger was appointed as interim Senator by Democratic Governor Pat Brown, before being defeated in the election by Republican George Murphy.

== Evaluations ==
Michael J. Towle weighs four factors determining the success and popularity of all seven press secretaries 1953 to 1980. Experts generally agree that James C. Hagerty, under Eisenhower, set the standard by which later press secretaries are judged. Under Carter, Jody Powell followed the Hagerty model, and was also judged successful. For Towle the first factor is the importance and centrality of the press secretary to the administration. Insiders who participate in high-level decision-making do better at explaining policy; the press has less confidence in outsiders, Towle concludes. The second factor is how tightly the office is controlled by the president. The media pays more attention to secretaries who are allowed to elaborate, and expound on the president's thoughts, and answer probing questions. Third, does the president signal confidence in the press secretary. Fourth is the respect the secretary has won from the press in terms of knowledge, credibility, clarity, promptness and ability to provide information on a wide range of policies.

Towle concludes that history had judged Hagerty and Salinger as successful. Lyndon Johnson confided in Salinger but distrusted the media and hobbled his next three press secretaries. Nixon throughout his career saw the press as the enemy, and the media responded in hostile fashion, leaving the young inexperienced Ronald Ziegler with a hopeless challenge. President Ford's first secretary was Jerald F. terHorst – he resigned in protest when Ford pardoned Nixon. Next came Ronald Nessen, who quickly acquired a reputation as inept, uninformed or noncredible, especially on foreign affairs. At the opposite extreme, the successful Jody Powell had been a close advisor to Carter for years, and could explain clearly how the president reasoned about issues. Carter said he "probably knows me better than anyone except my wife."

== Responsibilities ==
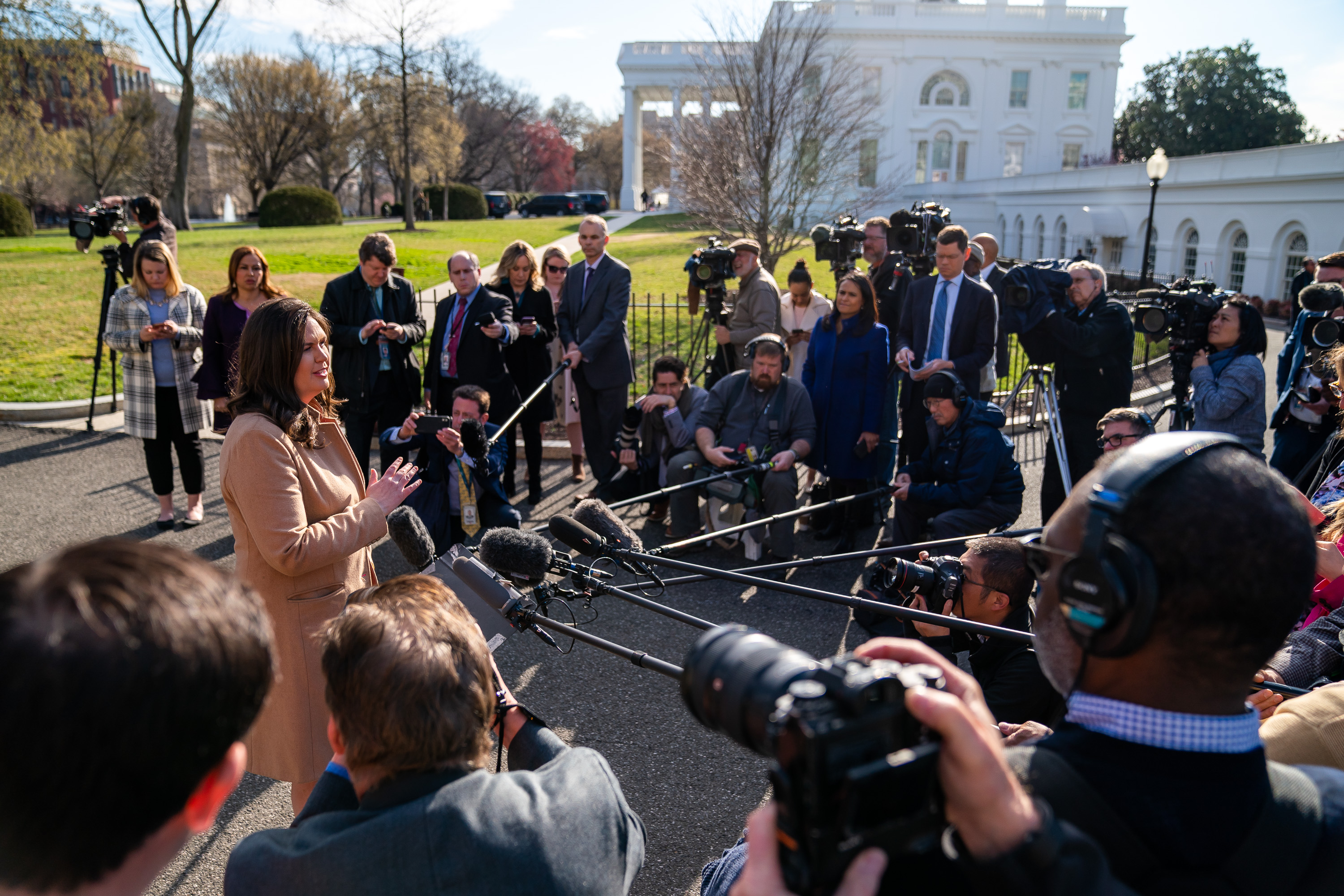
Sarah Huckabee Sanders speaks to reporters outside the White House in 2019.

The press secretary is responsible for collecting information about actions and events within the president's administration and around the world, and interacting with the media, generally in a daily press briefing. The information includes items such as a summary of the president's schedule for the day, whom the president has seen, or had communication with and the official position of the administration on the news of the day.

The press secretary traditionally also fields questions from the White House press corps in briefings and press conferences, which are generally televised, and "press gaggles", which are on-the-record briefings without video recording, although transcripts are usually made available.

The position has often been filled by individuals from news media backgrounds:

- Roosevelt administration – Stephen Early, a reporter for United Press International and correspondent for the Associated Press
- Truman administration – Jonathan W. Daniels, a newspaper editor who was in the Franklin Roosevelt administration in multiple agencies and on various boards just prior to becoming press secretary; Charlie Ross, a journalist who received the Pulitzer Prize in 1932; Early; Joseph Short, a newspaper editor; and Roger Tubby, a reporter and editor turned Democratic National Committee spokesman before becoming White House press secretary
- Eisenhower administration – James Hagerty, a reporter for The New York Times
- Kennedy administration – Pierre Salinger, a reporter and editor for the San Francisco Chronicle
- Johnson administration – appointed George Christian, a reporter for International News Service and PBS commentator Bill Moyers
- Ford administration – appointed Jerald terHorst, a newspaper veteran; and Ron Nessen, an NBC News correspondent
- Reagan administration – Larry Speakes, a newspaper editor; and Marlin Fitzwater, a newspaper editor
- George H. W. Bush administration – Marlin Fitzwater
- George W. Bush administration – Tony Snow, a veteran journalist and Fox News Channel anchor
- Obama administration – Jay Carney, Time journalist.
- First Trump administration – Kayleigh McEnany, producer for The Mike Huckabee Show from 2010–2013, CNN commentator during 2016 election cycle, Fox News Channel political commentator since 2021.
- Biden administration – Jen Psaki, CNN political commentator.

== List of press secretaries ==
Denotes acting capacity.

Image	Name	Start	End	Duration prior to final day in office	President
	George Akerson	March 4, 1929	March 16, 1931	2 years, 12 days	Herbert Hoover (1929–1933)
	Ted Joslin	March 16, 1931	March 4, 1933	1 year, 353 days	Herbert Hoover (1929–1933)
	Stephen Early	March 4, 1933	March 29, 1945	12 years, 25 days	Franklin D. Roosevelt (1933–1945)
	Jonathan Daniels	March 29, 1945	May 15, 1945	47 days	Franklin D. Roosevelt (1933–1945)
	Jonathan Daniels	March 29, 1945	May 15, 1945	47 days	Harry S. Truman (1945–1953)
	Charles G. Ross	May 15, 1945	December 5, 1950	5 years, 204 days	Harry S. Truman (1945–1953)
	Stephen Early; Acting	December 5, 1950	December 18, 1950	13 days	Harry S. Truman (1945–1953)
	Joseph Short	December 18, 1950	September 18, 1952	1 year, 288 days	Harry S. Truman (1945–1953)
	Roger Tubby	September 18, 1952	January 20, 1953	124 days	Harry S. Truman (1945–1953)
	James Hagerty	January 20, 1953	January 20, 1961	8 years, 0 days	Dwight D. Eisenhower (1953–1961)
	Pierre Salinger	January 20, 1961	March 19, 1964	3 years, 59 days	John F. Kennedy (1961–1963)
	Pierre Salinger	January 20, 1961	March 19, 1964	3 years, 59 days	Lyndon B. Johnson (1963–1969)
	George Reedy	March 19, 1964	July 8, 1965	1 year, 111 days	Lyndon B. Johnson (1963–1969)
	Bill Moyers	July 8, 1965	February 1, 1967	1 year, 208 days	Lyndon B. Johnson (1963–1969)
	George Christian	February 1, 1967	January 20, 1969	1 year, 354 days	Lyndon B. Johnson (1963–1969)
	Ron Ziegler	January 20, 1969	August 9, 1974	5 years, 201 days	Richard Nixon (1969–1974)
	Jerald terHorst	August 9, 1974	September 9, 1974	31 days	Gerald Ford (1974–1977)
	Ron Nessen	September 9, 1974	January 20, 1977	2 years, 133 days	Gerald Ford (1974–1977)
	Jody Powell	January 20, 1977	January 20, 1981	4 years, 0 days	Jimmy Carter (1977–1981)
	Jim Brady (Note: Brady formally retained the title of press secretary until the end of the Reagan administration in 1989, but he did not brief the press after he was shot in the 1981 assassination attempt. Speakes and Fitzwater served as de facto press secretaries.)	January 20, 1981	March 30, 1981 (de facto); January 20, 1989 (de jure)	69 days/ 8 years, 0 days	Ronald Reagan (1981–1989)
	Larry Speakes; Acting	March 30, 1981	February 1, 1987	5 years, 308 days	Ronald Reagan (1981–1989)
	Marlin Fitzwater	February 1, 1987	January 20, 1989	1 year, 354 days	Ronald Reagan (1981–1989)
	Marlin Fitzwater	January 20, 1989	January 20, 1993	4 years, 0 days	George H. W. Bush (1989–1993)
	Dee Dee Myers	January 20, 1993	December 22, 1994	1 year, 336 days	Bill Clinton (1993–2001)
	George Stephanopoulos (Note: Stephanopoulos briefed the press during his tenure as communications director, despite Myers formally holding the title.); De facto	January 20, 1993	June 7, 1993	138 days	Bill Clinton (1993–2001)
	Mike McCurry	December 22, 1994	August 4, 1998	3 years, 225 days	Bill Clinton (1993–2001)
	Joe Lockhart	August 4, 1998	September 29, 2000	2 years, 56 days	Bill Clinton (1993–2001)
	Jake Siewert	September 30, 2000	January 20, 2001	112 days	Bill Clinton (1993–2001)
	Ari Fleischer	January 20, 2001	July 15, 2003	2 years, 176 days	George W. Bush (2001–2009)
	Scott McClellan	July 15, 2003	May 10, 2006	2 years, 299 days	George W. Bush (2001–2009)
	Tony Snow	May 10, 2006	September 14, 2007	1 year, 127 days	George W. Bush (2001–2009)
	Dana Perino	September 14, 2007	January 20, 2009	1 year, 128 days	George W. Bush (2001–2009)
	Robert Gibbs	January 20, 2009	February 11, 2011	2 years, 22 days	Barack Obama (2009–2017)
	Jay Carney	February 11, 2011	June 20, 2014	3 years, 129 days	Barack Obama (2009–2017)
	Josh Earnest	June 20, 2014	January 20, 2017	2 years, 214 days	Barack Obama (2009–2017)
	Sean Spicer	January 20, 2017	July 21, 2017	182 days	Donald Trump (2017–2021)
	Sarah Huckabee Sanders	July 21, 2017	July 1, 2019	1 year, 345 days	Donald Trump (2017–2021)
	Stephanie Grisham (Note: Grisham, unlike her predecessors, did not hold any formal White House press briefings.)	July 1, 2019	April 7, 2020	281 days	Donald Trump (2017–2021)
	Kayleigh McEnany	April 7, 2020	January 20, 2021	288 days	Donald Trump (2017–2021)
	Jen Psaki	January 20, 2021	May 13, 2022	1 year, 113 days	Joe Biden (2021–2025)
	Karine Jean-Pierre	May 13, 2022	January 20, 2025	2 years, 252 days	Joe Biden (2021–2025)
	Karoline Leavitt	January 20, 2025	August 27, 2026	1 year, 219 days	Donald Trump (2025–present)
Vacant		August 27, 2026	October 12, 2026	46 days	Donald Trump (2025–present)
	Katie Zacharia	October 12, 2026	October 16, 2026	4 days	Donald Trump (2025–present)
Vacant		October 16, 2026	present	33 days	Donald Trump (2025–present)

== See also ==
- Press secretary
- Kremlin Press Secretary
