= Sigrid Arne =

Swedish-American journalist

- Born: Sigrid Maria Elisabet Nyberg; September 13, 1913; Stockholm, Sweden
- Died: February 26, 2013 (aged 99); Stockholm, Sweden
- Education: Uppsala University
- Occupations: Journalist, diplomat
- Years active: 1930s–1970s
- Employer: Svenska Dagbladet
- Known for: Foreign correspondence; Swedish diplomatic service

Sigrid Arne, a pseudonym of Sigrid Holmquist (1894–1973), was a Swedish-American journalist.

== Life ==
Sigrid Holmquist was born in New York City, possibly on 6 April 1894. She was the daughter of Magnus Holmquist, a manufacturer, and Hulda (Larson) Holmquist. In 1922 she gained a BA from the University of Michigan.

Holmquist became a local journalist in Oklahoma (the Muskogee Times-Democrat), New York (Plain Talk magazine), Cleveland and Detroit. In 1926 she adopted the pseudonym Sigrid Arne, perhaps to avoid confusion with the actress Sigrid Holmquist. In 1932, she joined the Washington Bureau of the Associated Press, and in December 1941 became a roving reporter for the AP. In 1950-51, she served as president of the American News Women's Club.

== Books ==
- The United Nations Primer, 1945.
