= The Island Packet =

Newspaper in Hilton Head Island, South Carolina

- Type: Daily newspaper
- Format: Broadsheet
- Owner: The McClatchy Company
- Publisher: Brian Tolley
- Editor: Brian Tolley
- Founded: 1970
- Headquarters: 10 Buck Island Road; Bluffton, SC 29910; United States
- Circulation: 16,196 Daily; 17,015 Sunday (as of 2020)
- ISSN: 0746-4886
- Website: islandpacket.com

The Island Packet is a daily morning broadsheet newspaper owned by Chatham Asset Management, serving primarily the residents of southern Beaufort County, South Carolina, United States, particularly the towns of Hilton Head Island and Bluffton.

== History ==
The newspaper was founded as a weekly on July 9, 1970, by Tom Wamsley and Ralph Hilton, with financial backing by Lucy and Jonathan Daniels, editor emeritus of the Raleigh News & Observer. Television personality Garry Moore had a regular humor column in the paper in the late 1970s and early 1980s titled "Mumble, Mumble".

The Island Packet increased to two tabloid editions per week to three broadsheet editions, then five. Finally, the paper added a Sunday edition. In October 2024, the paper reduced the number of print editions per week to three.

== See also ==
- List of newspapers in South Carolina
