= Secretary to the President of the United States =

Historical White House position

Abraham Lincoln and his secretaries John George Nicolay and John Hay photographed by Alexander Gardner on November 8, 1863 in Washington, D.C.

The secretary to the president is a long-standing position in the federal government of the United States, known by many different titles during its history. In terms of rank, it was a precursor to the modern White House chief of staff until the creation of that position in 1946.

In the 19th- and early 20th-century it was a White House position that carried out all the tasks now spread throughout the modern White House Office. The secretary would act as a buffer between the president and the public, keeping the president's schedules and appointments, managing his correspondence, managing the staff, communicating to the press as well as being a close aide and advisor to the president in a manner that often required great skill and discretion.

During the mid 20th century, the position became known as the "appointments secretary", the person who was the guardian of the president's time. He had the responsibility of acting as "gatekeeper" and decided who got to meet with him.

The modern-day position of the president's secretary is fulfilled by an administrative assistant or personal assistant in the White House Office Oval Office Operations department who has a desk directly outside the Oval Office.

== History ==
During the nineteenth century, presidents had few staff resources. Thomas Jefferson had one messenger and one secretary (referred to as an amanuensis in the common parlance of the time) at his disposal, both of whose salaries were paid by the president personally. In fact, all presidents up to James Buchanan paid the salaries of their private secretaries out of their own pockets; these roles were usually fulfilled by their relatives, most often their sons or nephews. James K. Polk notably had his wife take the role.

It was during Buchanan's term at the White House in 1857 that the United States Congress created a definite office named the "Private Secretary at the White House" and appropriated for its incumbent a salary of $2,500. The first man to hold such office officially and to be paid by the government instead of by the president, was Buchanan's nephew J. B. Henry. By Ulysses S. Grant's presidency, the White House staff had grown to three.

By 1900, the office had grown in such stature that Congress elevated the position to "Secretary to the President", in addition to including on the White House staff two assistant secretaries, two executive clerks, a stenographer, and seven other office personnel. The first man to hold the office of Secretary to the President was John Addison Porter whose failing health meant he was soon succeeded by George B. Cortelyou. Radio and the advent of media coverage soon meant that Theodore Roosevelt and Woodrow Wilson too expanded the duties of their respective secretaries to dealing with reporters and giving daily press briefings.

At the time of its peak the Secretary to the President was a much admired government office held by men of high ability and considered as worthy as a cabinet rank; it even merited an oath of office. Three private secretaries were later appointed to the Cabinet: George B. Cortelyou, John Hay and Daniel S. Lamont.

Under Warren G. Harding, the size of the staff expanded to thirty-one, although most were clerical positions. During Herbert Hoover's presidency however, he tripled the staff adding two additional private secretaries (at a salary of $10,000 each – increased from $7,200) added by Congress. The first Hoover designated his Legislative Secretary (the senior Secretary now informally referred to by the press as the president's "No.1 Secretary" ), the second his Confidential Secretary, and the third his Appointments and Press Secretary.

In 1933, Franklin D. Roosevelt converted Hoover's two extra secretaries into the permanent White House Press Secretary and Appointments Secretary, but from 1933 to 1939, as he greatly expanded the scope of the federal government's policies and powers in response to the Great Depression, Roosevelt relied on his "Brain Trust" of top advisers. Although working directly for the president, they were often appointed to vacant positions in agencies and departments, from whence they drew their salaries since the White House lacked statutory or budgetary authority to create new staff positions. It wasn't until 1939, during Franklin D. Roosevelt's second term in office, that the foundations of the modern White House staff were created using a formal structure. Roosevelt was able to get Congress to approve the creation of the Executive Office of the President reporting directly to the president, which included the White House Office. As a consequence, the office of Secretary to the President was greatly diminished in stature (mostly due to the lack of a sufficient replacement to Roosevelt's confidant Louis McHenry Howe who had died in 1936) and had many of its duties supplanted by the Appointments Secretary.

The appointments secretary was the guardian of the president's time. He had the responsibility of acting as "gatekeeper" and decided who got to meet with him.

Dwight D. Eisenhower appointed Arthur H. Vandenberg Jr. to the position, but he took a leave of absence before Eisenhower's inauguration and later withdrew without ever having served.

In 1946, in response to the rapid growth of the U.S. government's executive branch, the position of Assistant to the President of the United States was established, and charged with the affairs of the White House. Together with the Appointments Secretary the two took responsibility of most of the president's affairs and at this point the Secretary to the President was charged with nothing other than managing the president's official correspondence before the office was discontinued at the close of the Truman administration.

In 1961, under Republican President Eisenhower, the president's pre-eminent assistant was designated the White House Chief of Staff. Assistant to the President became a rank generally shared by the Chief of Staff with such senior aides as Deputy Chiefs of Staff, the White House Counsel, the White House Press Secretary, and others. This new system didn't catch on straight away. Democrats Kennedy and Johnson still relied on their appointments secretaries instead and it was not until the Nixon administration that the Chief of Staff became a permanent fixture in the White House, and the appointments secretary was reduced to only functional importance. The Appointments Secretary position was eliminated in 1981, with the responsibilities transferred to the recently created White House Deputy Chief of Staff position.

The prior role of Secretary to the President should not be confused with the modern president's personal secretary who is officially an administrative assistant in the Executive Office of the President. The role of personal secretary to the president should also not be confused with the personal aide to the president (commonly known as the "body man" or "body woman").

== List of presidential secretaries ==
=== Private Secretary ===
| Name | Start | End | President |
|---|---|---|---|
| William Jackson (Note: As aide-de-camp.) | April 30, 1789 | 1791 | George Washington (1789–1797) |
| Tobias Lear (Note: Washington had several young assistant secretaries who made copies of his correspondence. Among these were Bob Lewis, Howell Lewis, Bartholomew Dandridge, and George Craik.) | April 30, 1789 | 1793 | George Washington (1789–1797) |
| Tobias Lear | 1794 | March 4, 1797 | George Washington (1789–1797) |
| William Shaw | March 4, 1797 | March 4, 1801 | John Adams (1797–1801) |
| Meriwether Lewis | March 4, 1801 | June 1803 | Thomas Jefferson (1801–1809) |
| Lewis Harvie | June 1803 | March 1804 | Thomas Jefferson (1801–1809) |
| William Burwell | March 1804 | 1805 | Thomas Jefferson (1801–1809) |
| Isaac Coles | 1805 | March 4, 1809 | Thomas Jefferson (1801–1809) |
| Edward Coles | January 1810 | March 1815 | James Madison (1809–1817) |
| John Todd | 1816 | March 4, 1817 | James Madison (1809–1817) |
| Joseph Monroe | March 4, 1817 | 1820 | James Monroe (1817–1825) |
| Samuel Gouverneur | 1820 | March 4, 1825 | James Monroe (1817–1825) |
| John Adams | March 4, 1825 | March 4, 1829 | John Quincy Adams (1825–1829) |
| Andrew Donelson | March 4, 1829 | 1831 | Andrew Jackson (1829–1837) |
| Nicholas Trist | 1831 | 1831 | Andrew Jackson (1829–1837) |
| Andrew Donelson | 1831 | March 4, 1837 | Andrew Jackson (1829–1837) |
| Abraham Van Buren | March 4, 1837 | March 4, 1841 | Martin Van Buren (1837–1841) |
| Henry Harrison | March 4, 1841 | April 4, 1841 | William Harrison (1841) |
| John Tyler | April 4, 1841 | March 4, 1845 | John Tyler (1841–1845) |
| Joseph Walker (Note: Polk's wife, Sarah Childress Polk, is also said have been his personal secretary.) | March 4, 1845 | March 4, 1849 | James Polk (1845–1849) |
| William Bliss | March 4, 1849 | July 9, 1850 | Zachary Taylor (1849–1850) |
| Millard Fillmore | July 9, 1850 | March 4, 1853 | Millard Fillmore (1850–1853) |
| Sidney Webster | March 4, 1853 | March 4, 1857 | Franklin Pierce (1853–1857) |

=== Private Secretary to the White House ===
| Name | Start | End | President |
|---|---|---|---|
| James Henry | March 4, 1857 | 1859 | James Buchanan (1857–1861) |
| James Buchanan | 1859 | March 4, 1861 | James Buchanan (1857–1861) |
| John Nicolay | March 4, 1861 | April 15, 1865 | Abraham Lincoln (1861–1865) |
| John Hay (Note: As Military Secretary.) | March 4, 1861 | April 15, 1865 | Abraham Lincoln (1861–1865) |
| William Browning | April 15, 1865 | November 14, 1865 | Andrew Johnson (1865–1869) |
| Reuben Mussey | April 15, 1865 | November 14, 1865 | Andrew Johnson (1865–1869) |
| Bob Johnson (Note: "Bob," as he was called, was an alcoholic and was in asylums for treatment during several periods of his father's presidency.) | November 14, 1865 | October 3, 1867 | Andrew Johnson (1865–1869) |
| Edmund Cooper | October 3, 1867 | November 20, 1867 | Andrew Johnson (1865–1869) |
| William Moore | 1866 | March 4, 1869 | Andrew Johnson (1865–1869) |
| Robert Douglas (Note: Grant was closer to his military secretaries who did most of the work normally associated with the Private Secretary.) | March 4, 1869 | 1873 | Ulysses Grant (1869–1877) |
| Horace Porter | March 4, 1869 | 1872 | Ulysses Grant (1869–1877) |
| Frederick Dent | March 4, 1869 | 1873 | Ulysses Grant (1869–1877) |
| Orville Babcock | March 4, 1869 | February 7, 1876 | Ulysses Grant (1869–1877) |
| Levi Luckey | 1873 | February 7, 1876 | Ulysses Grant (1869–1877) |
| Ulysses Grant | February 7, 1876 | March 4, 1877 | Ulysses Grant (1869–1877) |
| Webb Hayes | March 4, 1877 | March 4, 1881 | Rutherford Hayes (1877–1881) |
| Joseph Brown | March 4, 1881 | September 19, 1881 | James Garfield (1881) |
| Fred Phillips | September 19, 1881 | March 4, 1885 | Chester Arthur (1881–1885) |
| Daniel Lamont | March 4, 1885 | March 4, 1889 | Grover Cleveland (1885–1889) |
| Elijah Halford | March 4, 1889 | March 4, 1893 | Benjamin Harrison (1889–1893) |
| Henry Thurber | March 4, 1893 | March 4, 1897 | Grover Cleveland (1893–1897) |

=== Secretary to the President ===
| Name | Start | End | President |
|---|---|---|---|
| John Porter | March 4, 1897 | May 1, 1900 | William McKinley (1897–1901) |
| George Cortelyou | May 1, 1900 | February 18, 1903 | William McKinley (1897–1901) |
| George Cortelyou | May 1, 1900 | February 18, 1903 | Theodore Roosevelt (1901–1909) |
| William Loeb | February 18, 1903 | March 4, 1909 | Theodore Roosevelt (1901–1909) |
| Fred Carpenter | March 4, 1909 | 1910 | William Taft (1909–1913) |
| Charles Norton | 1910 | 1911 | William Taft (1909–1913) |
| Charles Hilles | 1911 | July 18, 1912 | William Taft (1909–1913) |
| Carmi Thompson | July 18, 1912 | November 22, 1912 | William Taft (1909–1913) |
| Joseph Tumulty | March 4, 1913 | March 4, 1921 | Woodrow Wilson (1913–1921) |
| George Christian | March 4, 1921 | August 2, 1923 | Warren Harding (1921–1923) |
| Bascom Slemp | September 4, 1923 | March 4, 1925 | Calvin Coolidge (1923–1929) |
| Everett Sanders | March 4, 1925 | March 4, 1929 | Calvin Coolidge (1923–1929) |
| Walter Newton | July 1, 1929 | March 3, 1933 | Herbert Hoover (1929–1933) |
| Louis Howe | March 4, 1933 | April 18, 1936 | Franklin Roosevelt (1933–1945) |
| James Roosevelt | July 1937 | November 1938 | Franklin Roosevelt (1933–1945) |
| Marvin McIntyre (Note: As "Correspondence Secretary to the President") | 1941 | 1943 | Franklin Roosevelt (1933–1945) |
| William Hassett | 1944 | 1952 | Franklin Roosevelt (1933–1945) |
| William Hassett | 1944 | 1952 | Harry Truman (1945–1953) |
| Beth Campbell Short | September 1952 | January 20, 1953 | Harry Truman (1945–1953) |

=== Appointments Secretary ===
Denotes acting capacity.

| Name | Start | End | President |
|---|---|---|---|
| George Akerson (Note: As Appointments and Press Secretary.) | March 4, 1929 | March 16, 1931 | Herbert Hoover (1929–1933) |
| Ted Joslin | March 16, 1931 | March 4, 1933 | Herbert Hoover (1929–1933) |
| Marvin McIntyre (Note: Before 1937 the title was only "Assistant Secretary to Appointments".) | March 4, 1933 | 1938 | Franklin Roosevelt (1933–1945) |
| Pa Watson | 1938 | April 12, 1945 | Franklin Roosevelt (1933–1945) |
| Matthew Connelly | April 12, 1945 | January 20, 1953 | Franklin Roosevelt (1933–1945) |
| Matthew Connelly | April 12, 1945 | January 20, 1953 | Harry Truman (1945–1953) |
| Arthur Vandenberg; On leave | January 20, 1953 | April 14, 1953 | Dwight Eisenhower (1953–1961) |
| Tom Stephens | January 20, 1953 | April 14, 1953 | Dwight Eisenhower (1953–1961) |
| Tom Stephens | April 14, 1953 | February 19, 1955 | Dwight Eisenhower (1953–1961) |
| Bernard Shanley | February 19, 1955 | November 6, 1957 | Dwight Eisenhower (1953–1961) |
| Bob Gray | November 6, 1957 | March 1958 | Dwight Eisenhower (1953–1961) |
| Tom Stephens | March 1958 | January 20, 1961 | Dwight Eisenhower (1953–1961) |
| Ken O'Donnell (Note: De facto White House Chief of Staff.) | January 20, 1961 | November 22, 1963 | John F. Kennedy (1961–1963) |
| Jack Valenti | November 22, 1963 | February 1, 1965 | Lyndon Johnson (1963–1969) |
| Marvin Watson | February 1, 1965 | April 26, 1968 | Lyndon Johnson (1963–1969) |
| Jim Jones | April 26, 1968 | January 20, 1969 | Lyndon Johnson (1963–1969) |
| Dwight Chapin | January 20, 1969 | March 1973 | Richard Nixon (1969–1974) |
| Stephen Bull | March 1973 | August 9, 1974 | Richard Nixon (1969–1974) |
| Warren Rustand | August 9, 1974 | January 20, 1977 | Gerald Ford (1974–1977) |
| Tim Kraft | January 20, 1977 | April 28, 1978 | Jimmy Carter (1977–1981) |
| Phil Wise | April 28, 1978 | January 20, 1981 | Jimmy Carter (1977–1981) |

=== Personal secretary to the president ===
| Name | Start | End | President |
|---|---|---|---|
| Missy LeHand | March 4, 1933 | June 4, 1941 | Franklin Roosevelt (1933–1945) |
| Grace Tully | June 4, 1941 | April 12, 1945 | Franklin Roosevelt (1933–1945) |
| Rose Conway | April 12, 1945 | January 20, 1953 | Harry Truman (1945–1953) |
| Ann Whitman | January 20, 1953 | January 20, 1961 | Dwight Eisenhower (1953–1961) |
| Evelyn Lincoln | January 20, 1961 | November 22, 1963 | John F. Kennedy (1961–1963) |
| Gerri Whittington | November 22, 1963 | January 20, 1969 | Lyndon Johnson (1963–1969) |
| Rose Mary Woods | January 20, 1969 | August 9, 1974 | Richard Nixon (1969–1974) |
| Dorothy Downton | August 9, 1974 | January 20, 1977 | Gerald Ford (1974–1977) |
| Susan Clough | January 20, 1977 | January 20, 1981 | Jimmy Carter (1977–1981) |
| Kathleen Osborne | January 20, 1981 | January 20, 1989 | Ronald Reagan (1981–1989) |
| Linda Casey | January 20, 1989 | January 20, 1993 | George H. W. Bush (1989–1993) |
| Betty Currie | January 20, 1993 | January 20, 2001 | Bill Clinton (1993–2001) |
| Ashley Estes Kavanaugh | January 20, 2001 | January 20, 2005 | George W. Bush (2001–2009) |
| Karen Keller | January 20, 2005 | January 20, 2009 | George W. Bush (2001–2009) |
| Katie Johnson | January 20, 2009 | June 10, 2011 | Barack Obama (2009–2017) |
| Anita Breckenridge | June 10, 2011 | May 22, 2014 | Barack Obama (2009–2017) |
| Ferial Govashiri | May 22, 2014 | January 20, 2017 | Barack Obama (2009–2017) |
| Madeleine Westerhout | January 20, 2017 | February 2, 2019 | Donald Trump (2017–2021) |
| Molly Michael | February 2, 2019 | January 20, 2021 | Donald Trump (2017–2021) |
| Ashley Williams (Note: As Deputy Director of Oval Office Operations) | January 20, 2021 | September 2022 | Joe Biden (2021–2025) |
| Julia Reed (Note: As Confidential Aide to the President) | September 2022 | March 2024 | Joe Biden (2021–2025) |
| Drew Rodriguez | March 2024 | January 20, 2025 | Joe Biden (2021–2025) |

== Sources ==
- The Cosmopolitan. University of Michigan. November 1900 – April 1901. pp. 487–92.
