= West River, Maryland =

Unincorporated community in Maryland, United States

- Unincorporated community
- Location within the state of Maryland West River, Maryland (the United States)
- Coordinates: 38°51′01″N 76°35′46″W
- Country: United States
- State: Maryland
- County: Anne Arundel
- Elevation: 82 ft (25 m)
- Time zone: UTC-5 (Eastern (EST))
  - Summer (DST): UTC-4 (EDT)
- ZIP code: 20778
- Area codes: 410,443 and 667

West River is an unincorporated community in Anne Arundel County, Maryland, United States.

== Notable people ==
- Joseph Galloway, First Continental Congressman
- Gerri Whittington, First African-American secretary in the White House
