= Dorothy E. Downton =

Personal secretary to US President Gerald Ford (1946–2026)

Dorothy Downton
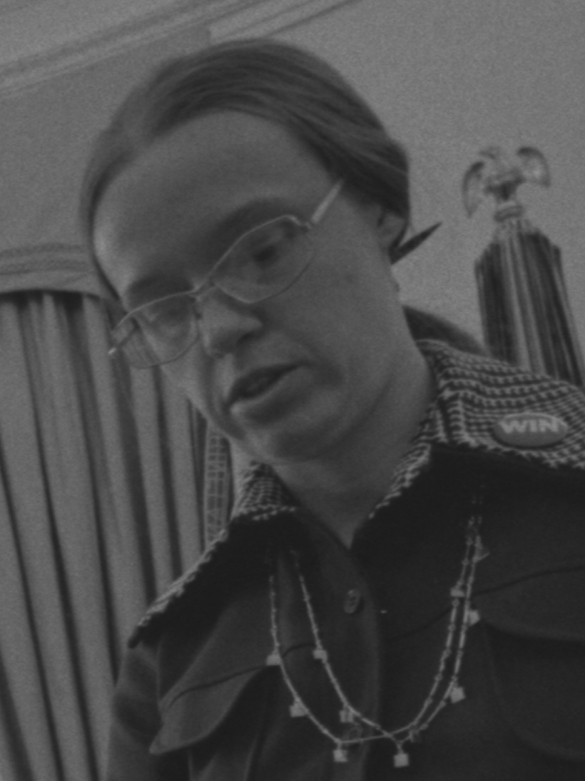
- Downton c. 1975

Personal Secretary to the President
- In office August 9, 1974 – January 20, 1977
- President: Gerald Ford
- Preceded by: Rose Mary Woods
- Succeeded by: Susan Clough

Personal details
- Born: Dorothy Elizabeth Hessler; November 11, 1946 Manistee, Michigan, U.S.
- Died: June 7, 2026 (aged 79) Carleton, Michigan, U.S.
- Party: Republican
- Education: Davenport University (BA)

Dorothy Elizabeth Downton (November 11, 1946 – June 7, 2026) served as the personal secretary to United States President Gerald Ford from 1974 to 1977.

== Early life and career ==
Born Dorothy Hessler in Manistee, Michigan, in 1946, Downton attended Davenport University. Upon graduating, she began working at the Federal Bureau of Investigation in the print division.

Downton joined Gerald R. Ford's congressional staff in 1967. She later served as personal secretary during his time as vice president and later as president. She also served as President Ford's personal secretary in his Rancho Mirage office and assisted his 1976 presidential campaign.

== Post-White House career ==
Downton continued to serve as Ford's personal secretary until 1980, and then moved to Detroit. In 1990, Downton returned to the workforce as Office Administrator for Lionel, LLC. She worked for the Associated Press as a secretary for the Michigan bureau from 1995 until her retirement in 2008.

Her White House files have been recorded and preserved by the Gerald R. Ford Presidential Library.

Downton died on June 7, 2026, at the age of 79.
