= Ferial Govashiri =

Personal secretary to U.S. President Barack Obama

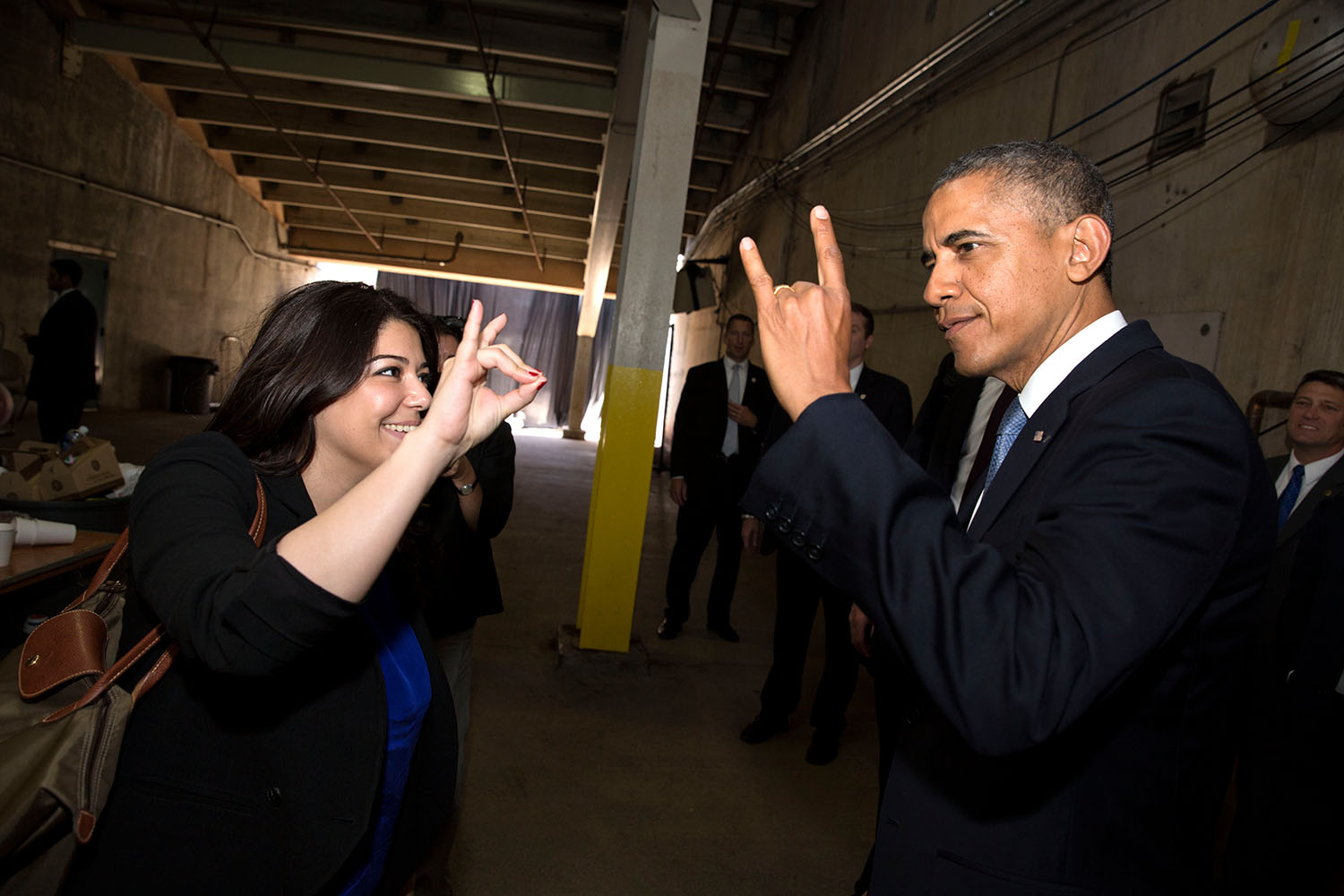
- President Barack Obama's Personal Secretary Ferial Govashiri shows him how to make the sign of the anteater, mascot of the University of California, Irvine, prior to the UCI commencement at Angels Stadium in Anaheim, Calif., Saturday, June 14, 2014. (Official White House Photo by Pete Souza)

Personal Secretary to the President
- In office May 22, 2014 – January 20, 2017
- President: Barack Obama
- Preceded by: Anita Decker Breckenridge
- Succeeded by: Madeleine Westerhout

Personal details
- Born: 1982 or 1983 (age 43–44) Iran
- Party: Democratic
- Education: University of California, Irvine (BA)

Ferial Govashiri (born 1982 or 1983) is an Iranian-American political aide who served as the personal secretary to U.S. president Barack Obama at the White House from May 2014 through January 20, 2017. Govashiri is currently chief of staff to the chief content officer at Netflix.

Beginning in the summer of 2007, she worked on then-Senator Barack Obama's presidential campaign in his Chicago headquarters in the department of Scheduling and Advance. Govashiri went on to work in the White House after the election.

For the first five years of the Obama administration, Govashiri worked on the National Security Council (NSC) staff, first as a senior advisor to Ben Rhodes, the deputy national security advisor and then as the senior advisor to the chief of staff and the director of visits at the NSC. She helped plan the president's foreign trips as well as foreign leaders' visits to the White House. She is fluent in English and Persian. She is an active member of the Iranian American Women Foundation and has spoken at conferences on their behalf.
