= Sebring, Ohio =

- Village
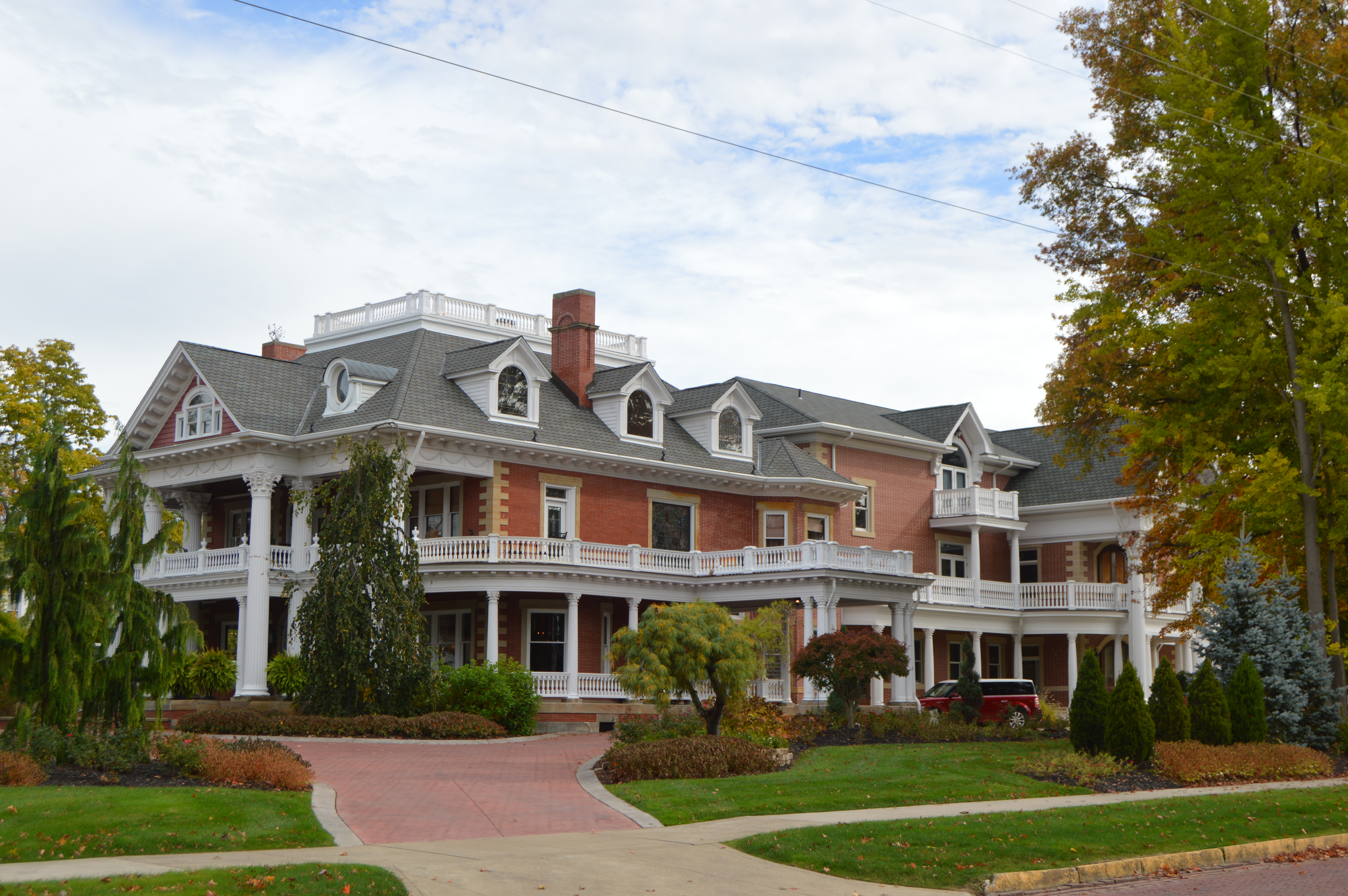
- Frank Sebring House
- Interactive map of Sebring, Ohio
- Location within Ohio Location within the United States
- Coordinates: 40°55′14″N 81°01′23″W
- Country: United States
- State: Ohio
- County: Mahoning
- Township: Smith

Area
  - Total: 2.51 sq mi (6.51 km^{2})
  - Land: 2.49 sq mi (6.46 km^{2})
  - Water: 0.015 sq mi (0.04 km^{2})
- Elevation: 1,106 ft (337 m)

Population (2020)
  - Total: 4,191
  - Density: 1,679.6/sq mi (648.48/km^{2})
- Time zone: UTC-5 (Eastern (EST))
  - Summer (DST): UTC-4 (EDT)
- ZIP code: 44672
- Area codes: 234/330
- FIPS code: 39-71220
- GNIS feature ID: 1086569
- Website: https://sebringohio.net/

Sebring is a village in southwestern Mahoning County, Ohio, United States. The population was 4,191 as of the 2020 census. It is part of the Youngstown–Warren metropolitan area.

== History ==
Sebring was founded by the Sebring family from East Liverpool, Ohio, who were successful pottery owners that sought to establish their own pottery town. Sebring was incorporated 1899. Much of the original family built the establishing houses and factories in the town, which at their high employed approximately 3,300 workers. Only a few pottery decorating factories still exist, amongst other industries.

== Geography ==
According to the United States Census Bureau, the village has a total area of 2.52 square miles (6.53 km^{2}), of which 2.50 square miles (6.47 km^{2}) is land and 0.02 square miles (0.05 km^{2}) is water.

== Demographics ==
Historical population
Census	Pop.	Note	%±
1900	387		—
1910	2,104		443.7%
1920	3,541		68.3%
1930	3,949		11.5%
1940	3,902		−1.2%
1950	4,045		3.7%
1960	4,439		9.7%
1970	4,954		11.6%
1980	5,078		2.5%
1990	4,848		−4.5%
2000	4,912		1.3%
2010	4,420		−10.0%
2020	4,191		−5.2%
U.S. Decennial Census

=== 2020 census ===
As of the 2020 census, Sebring had a population of 4,191. The median age was 51.0 years. 17.6% of residents were under the age of 18 and 32.4% of residents were 65 years of age or older. For every 100 females there were 85.9 males, and for every 100 females age 18 and over there were 82.0 males age 18 and over.

98.6% of residents lived in urban areas, while 1.4% lived in rural areas.

There were 1,850 households in Sebring, of which 21.2% had children under the age of 18 living in them. Of all households, 37.2% were married-couple households, 20.0% were households with a male householder and no spouse or partner present, and 34.6% were households with a female householder and no spouse or partner present. About 38.8% of all households were made up of individuals and 23.1% had someone living alone who was 65 years of age or older.

There were 2,231 housing units, of which 17.1% were vacant. The homeowner vacancy rate was 2.4% and the rental vacancy rate was 19.6%.

Racial composition as of the 2020 census
Race	Number	Percent
White	4,028	96.1%
Black or African American	12	0.3%
American Indian and Alaska Native	5	0.1%
Asian	9	0.2%
Native Hawaiian and Other Pacific Islander	1	0.0%
Some other race	9	0.2%
Two or more races	127	3.0%
Hispanic or Latino (of any race)	37	0.9%

=== 2010 census ===
As of the census of 2010, there were 4,420 people, 1,898 households, and 1,098 families living in the village. The population density was 1,768.0 inhabitants per square mile (682.6/km^{2}). There were 2,291 housing units at an average density of 916.4 per square mile (353.8/km^{2}). The racial makeup of the village was 97.8% White, 0.2% African American, 0.1% Native American, 0.2% Asian, 0.4% from other races, and 1.2% from two or more races. Hispanic or Latino of any race were 0.7% of the population.

There were 1,898 households, of which 25.7% had children under the age of 18 living with them, 41.7% were married couples living together, 10.1% had a female householder with no husband present, 6.1% had a male householder with no wife present, and 42.1% were non-families. 37.6% of all households were made up of individuals, and 25.1% had someone living alone who was 65 years of age or older. The average household size was 2.23 and the average family size was 2.90.

The median age in the village was 45.3 years. 20.4% of residents were under the age of 18; 8.4% were between the ages of 18 and 24; 21% were from 25 to 44; 23.4% were from 45 to 64; and 26.9% were 65 years of age or older. The gender makeup of the village was 45.7% male and 54.3% female.

=== 2000 census ===
As of the census of 2000, there were 4,912 people, 2,088 households, and 1,252 families living in the village. The population density was 2,395.0 inhabitants per square mile (924.7/km^{2}). There were 2,252 housing units at an average density of 1,098.0 per square mile (423.9/km^{2}). The racial makeup of the village was 98.37% White, 0.47% African American, 0.08% Native American, 0.16% Asian, 0.02% Pacific Islander, 0.24% from other races, and 0.65% from two or more races. Hispanic or Latino of any race were 0.77% of the population.

There were 2,088 households, out of which 24.9% had children under the age of 18 living with them, 47.2% were married couples living together, 9.0% had a female householder with no husband present, and 40.0% were non-families. 37.0% of all households were made up of individuals, and 25.9% had someone living alone who was 65 years of age or older. The average household size was 2.25 and the average family size was 2.95.

In the village, the population was spread out, with 21.6% under the age of 18, 6.7% from 18 to 24, 24.4% from 25 to 44, 19.3% from 45 to 64, and 28.0% who were 65 years of age or older. The median age was 43 years. For every 100 females there were 81.1 males. For every 100 females age 18 and over, there were 74.9 males.

The median income for a household in the village was $32,019, and the median income for a family was $41,020. Males had a median income of $31,601 versus $20,256 for females. The per capita income for the village was $17,103. About 8.4% of families and 10.9% of the population were below the poverty line, including 12.8% of those under age 18 and 9.8% of those age 65 or over.

== Transportation ==
=== Airport ===
Tri-City Airport is a public use airport located one nautical mile (2 km) southeast of the central business district of Sebring.

== Education ==
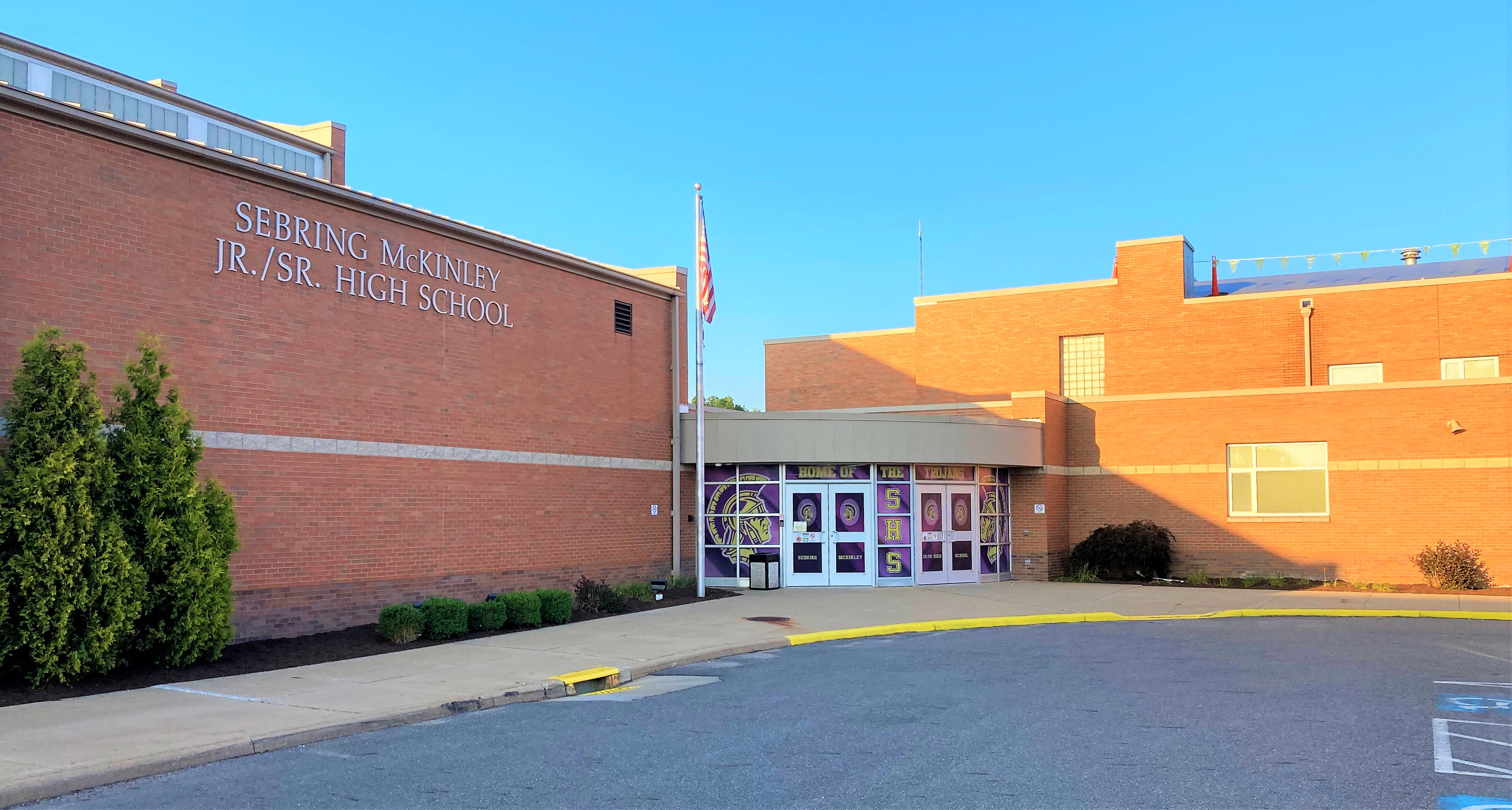
McKinley Junior/Senior High School

Sebring is served by the public Sebring Local School District, which includes one elementary school and McKinley Junior/Senior High School. Sebring has a public library, a branch of the Public Library of Youngstown and Mahoning County.

== Notable people ==
- Viktor Schreckengost — industrial designer
- Rose Mary Woods — secretary to U.S. President Richard Nixon
