= Karen E. Keller =

American public official

Karen Keller
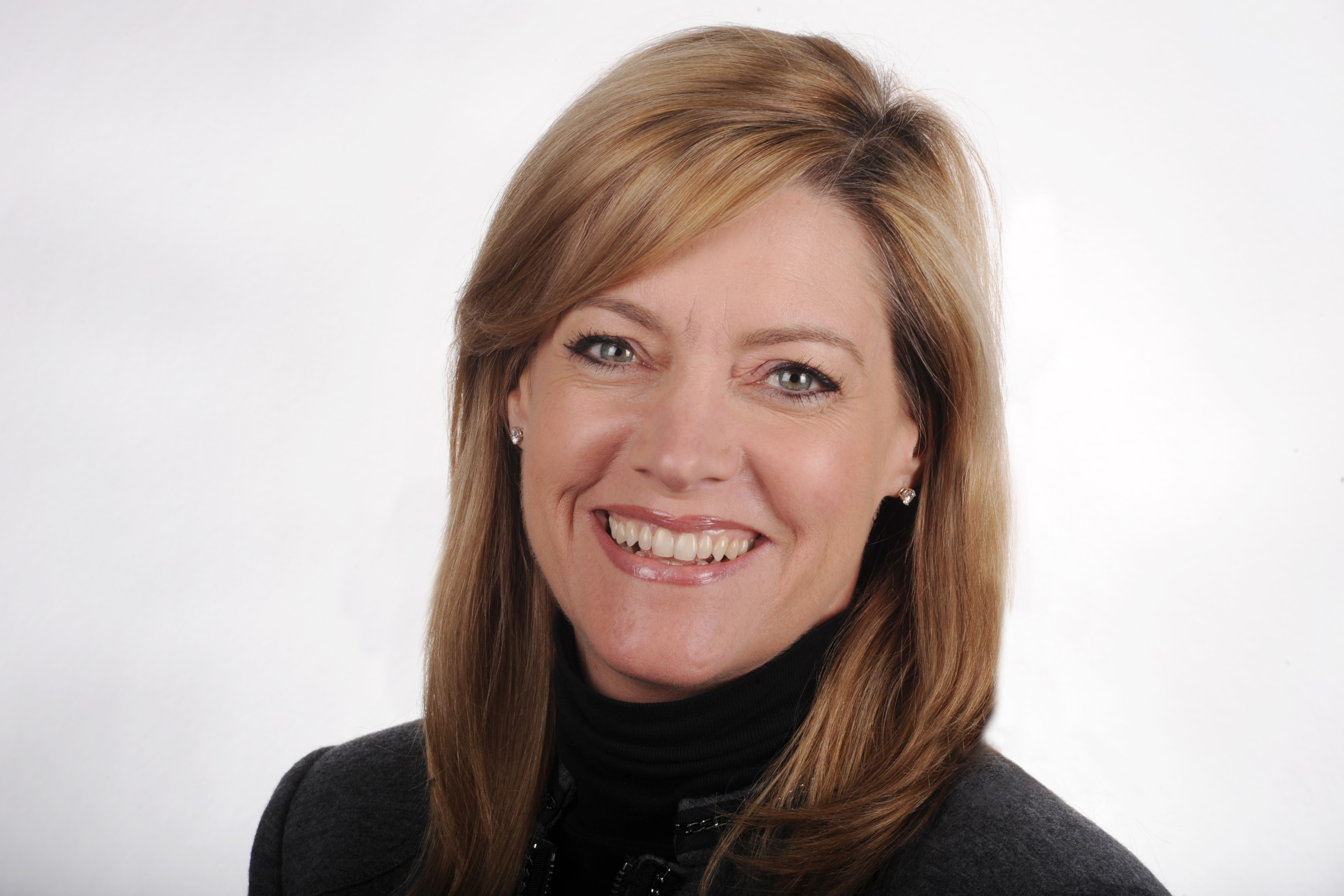

Personal Secretary to the President
- In office 2005–2009
- President: George W. Bush
- Preceded by: Ashley Estes Kavanaugh
- Succeeded by: Katie Johnson

Personal details
- Born: Washington, D.C., U.S.
- Party: Republican
- Education: Towson University (BA)

Karen E. Keller served as the personal secretary to United States President George W. Bush from 2005 to 2009 and is the current Director of Special Events and Protocol for the Smithsonian Institution.

== Early life and career ==
Born and raised in Washington, D.C., Keller received her Bachelor of Arts in English from Towson University. She worked for 10 years with Burson-Marsteller and then became deputy CEO of the Republican National Convention. Keller went on to serve as special assistant to the director of the Office of Management and Budget, and simultaneously served as the director of administration for the 55th United States presidential inaugural committee.

In 2005, Keller was tapped to serve as Special Assistant to the President and Personal Secretary with a starting annual salary of $92,100. Keller was described by GQ as "glamorous."

== Post-secretarial career ==
After leaving the White House in January 2009, Keller became the director of Programs and Events for Meridian International Center.

In 2011, Keller was named as Director of Special Events and Protocol for the Smithsonian Institution. In this senior administrative role, Keller oversees the office that is responsible for planning, programming and managing the Institution’s major special events, including museum and exhibition openings, fundraising galas, dignitary and head-of-state visits, board meetings, conferences and symposia. An amateur photographer, Keller placed third in the juried photography exhibition, A Unique Lens: Photographs from the Smithsonian Family at the S. Dillon Ripley Center.

Keller has been a guest presenter at the George W. Bush Presidential Center about the Oval Office.
