= Susan Clough =

Personal Secretary to Jimmy Carter (1945–2024)

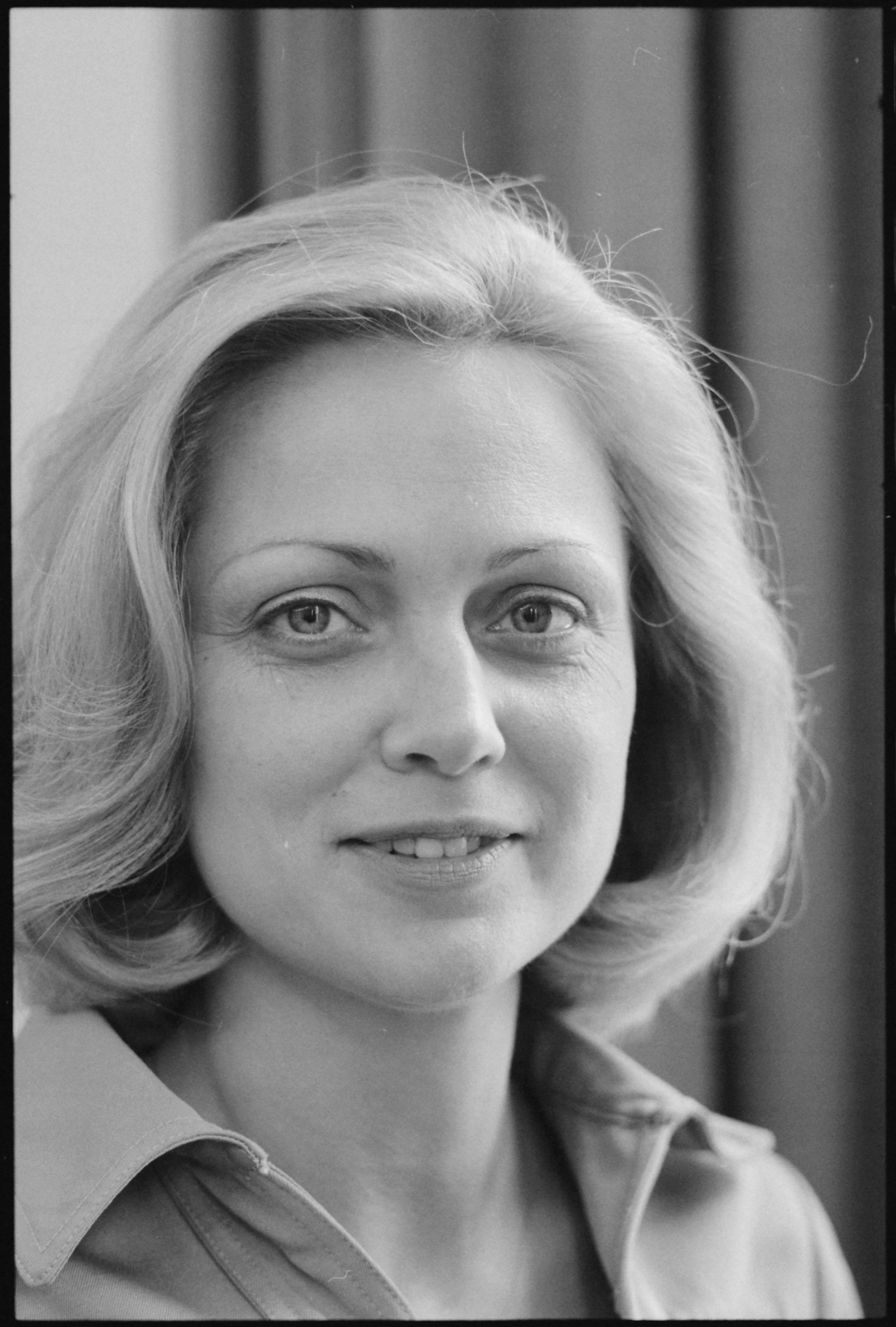

Personal Secretary to the President
- In office January 20, 1977 – January 20, 1981
- President: Jimmy Carter
- Preceded by: Dorothy E. Downton
- Succeeded by: Kathleen Osborne

Personal details
- Born: March 11, 1945 Columbia, South Carolina, U.S.
- Died: January 1, 2024 (aged 78) Louisville, Kentucky, U.S.
- Party: Democratic
- Education: Fresno City College (attended)

Susan Sebesta Clough (March 11, 1945 – January 1, 2024) was the personal executive secretary to President Jimmy Carter. She also worked for him prior to his presidency.

== Prior to secretarial work ==
Clough married a 22-year-old Stanley Clough when she was 16 and had her two children, Doug and Carol Ann, prior to turning 18. She left her husband when she was 18 and began looking for a job while raising Doug and Carol. After studying for one year at Fresno City College, she found herself with no marketable skills. She was receiving only $200 per month from her ex-husband, and struggled financially. However, Clough was ambitious and intelligent. She was a Mensa member, and could play piano and classical guitar, make clothes, and was an avid reader of nonfiction. She also enjoyed playing competitive games.

== As secretary ==
After completing a secretarial course, she found a job at Fort Bragg, N.C. Her ex-husband had been stationed there, and her father was a retired Army colonel. She quit her job there partially "because all my bosses were propositioning me." She then moved to Atlanta and became a legal secretary.

== Work for Carter ==
In 1971 she became a member of Carter's staff, and took the position of assistant to the press chief Jody Powell. She then began to work as Carter's personal secretary while he was Governor of Georgia. Her job included such duties as research and drafting speeches. It was during that time that she developed a friendship with Carter. When he left office at the end of his term in 1975, Clough remained to serve Carter's successor, George Busbee. Eighteenth months later, Carter telephoned her, and asked her to return to work for him. She did, and eventually became the personal assistant and secretary to the President. Her duties included drafting much of his correspondence. She received a salary of more than $30,000 per year.

== Personal life and death ==
Clough was born in Columbia, South Carolina on March 11, 1945. Her younger brother was shot and killed during a spree of random murders around Atlanta.

Clough died in Louisville, Kentucky on January 1, 2024, at the age of 78.
