= James Buchanan Henry =

American lawyer

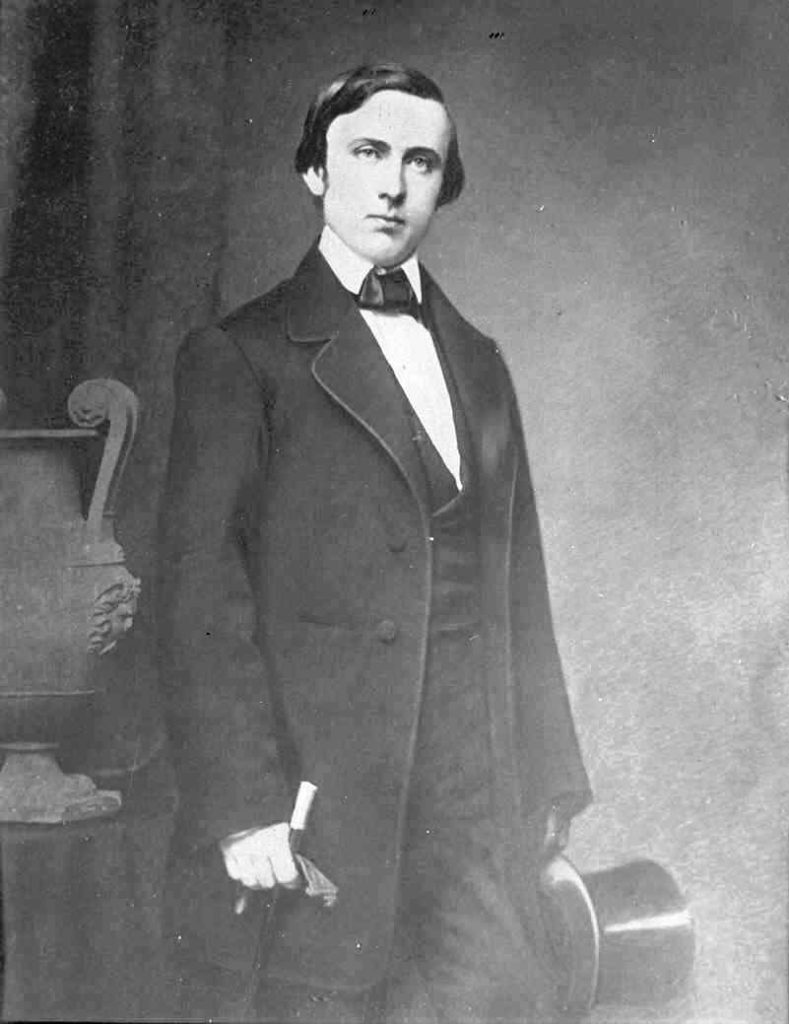

Private Secretary to the President
- In office 1857–1859
- President: James Buchanan Jr.
- Preceded by: Sidney Webster
- Succeeded by: James Buchanan III

Personal details
- Born: March 1, 1833 Greensburg, Pennsylvania, U.S.
- Died: February 17, 1915 (aged 81) Coconut Grove, Florida, U.S.
- Spouse(s): Mary Hagner Nicholson (m. 1859; died 1865) Louisa Anderson (m. 1872; died 1886) Margaret Grote Ellman (m. 1904)
- Children: 8
- Education: College of New Jersey

James Buchanan Henry (March 1, 1833 – February 17, 1915) was a lawyer, writer, Private Secretary to the President of the United States, nephew and ward of James Buchanan. He was the first man to hold this office after it became a paid government post. He held this position for two years.

J. B. Henry was the son of Harriet Elizabeth Buchanan (1802–1840) and the Reverend Robert Henry (1801–1838). At age seven, Henry was adopted by uncle James Buchanan and raised as his ward. Buchanan wanted his nephew to become an attorney like him, and paid for his admittance and education at Princeton in 1850. In 1851 he sent Henry to study law in Philadelphia with John Cadwalader.

Prior to Henry, each president paid the wages of his private secretaries out of his own pocket. Some of Henry's duties included drawing the President's salary and paying all of the bills. His post was in the office of the southeast corner room, second floor. He served there between the years 1857 to 1859. Henry was succeeded by his cousin, James Buchanan III (1834–1877).

After leaving the White House, he practiced law in New York City, where he served as Assistant United States District Attorney.
