= Evelyn Lincoln =

Personal secretary to John F. Kennedy (1909–1995)

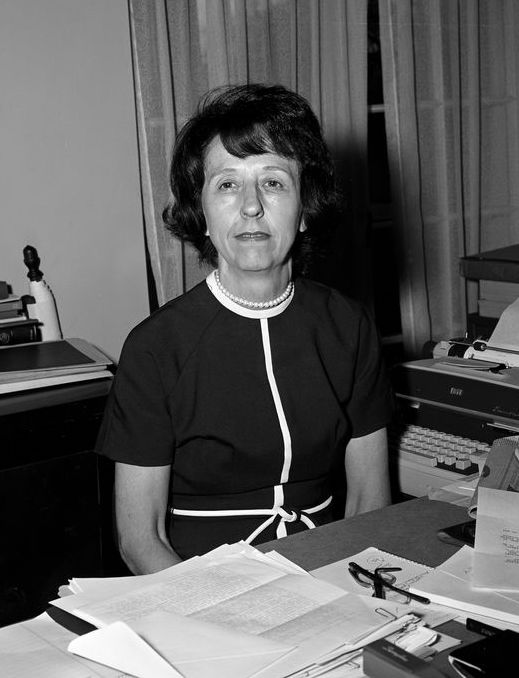
- Lincoln in 1961

Personal Secretary to the President
- In office January 20, 1961 – November 22, 1963
- President: John F. Kennedy
- Preceded by: Ann C. Whitman
- Succeeded by: Gerri Whittington

Personal details
- Born: Evelyn Maurine Norton; June 25, 1909 Polk County, Nebraska, U.S.
- Died: May 11, 1995 (aged 85) Washington, D.C., U.S.
- Resting place: Arlington National Cemetery
- Party: Democratic
- Relatives: John N. Norton (father)

Evelyn Maurine Norton Lincoln (June 25, 1909 – May 11, 1995) was the personal secretary to John F. Kennedy from his election to the United States Senate in 1953 until his 1963 assassination.

== Life ==
Lincoln was born Evelyn Maurine Norton on a farm in Polk County, Nebraska. Her father was John N. Norton, a member of the United States House of Representatives. In 1930, she married Federal worker Harold W. Lincoln, whom she met while he was a law student at George Washington University.

Lincoln had always aimed to work on Capitol Hill for a future president, and she achieved this ambition in 1953 by becoming personal secretary to the newly elected senator from Massachusetts, John F. Kennedy. She proved suitable for the job, and remained close to the president until his death. When Kennedy was assassinated in Dallas, Texas on November 22, 1963, Lincoln rode in the motorcade a few cars behind Kennedy with his personal physician, George G. Burkley.

Lincoln was reportedly upset that President Lyndon B. Johnson had given her 30 minutes to clear her office for his staff the morning following the assassination. In 1968, she wrote a book, Kennedy and Johnson, in which she wrote that President Kennedy had told her that Johnson would be replaced as Vice President of the United States. Lincoln wrote of that November 19, 1963 conversation, just before the assassination of President Kennedy,

As Mr. Kennedy sat in the rocker in my office, his head resting on its back he placed his left leg across his right knee. He rocked slightly as he talked. In a slow pensive voice he said to me, "You know if I am re-elected in sixty-four, I am going to spend more and more time toward making government service an honorable career. I would like to tailor the executive and legislative branches of government so that they can keep up with the tremendous strides and progress being made in other fields. I am going to advocate changing some of the outmoded rules and regulations in the Congress, such as the seniority rule. To do this I will need as a running mate in sixty-four a man who believes as I do."

Lincoln went on to write "I was fascinated by this conversation and wrote it down verbatim in my diary. Now I asked, 'Who is your choice as a running-mate?' 'He looked straight ahead, and without hesitating he replied, 'at this time I am thinking about Governor Terry Sanford of North Carolina. But it will not be Lyndon.'"

In October 1994, Lincoln replied to a high school teacher's inquiry regarding her thoughts about the assassination stating that she believed Johnson – along with FBI director J. Edgar Hoover, the Central Intelligence Agency, the Mafia, and "Cubans in Florida" – was involved in a conspiracy to assassinate Kennedy.

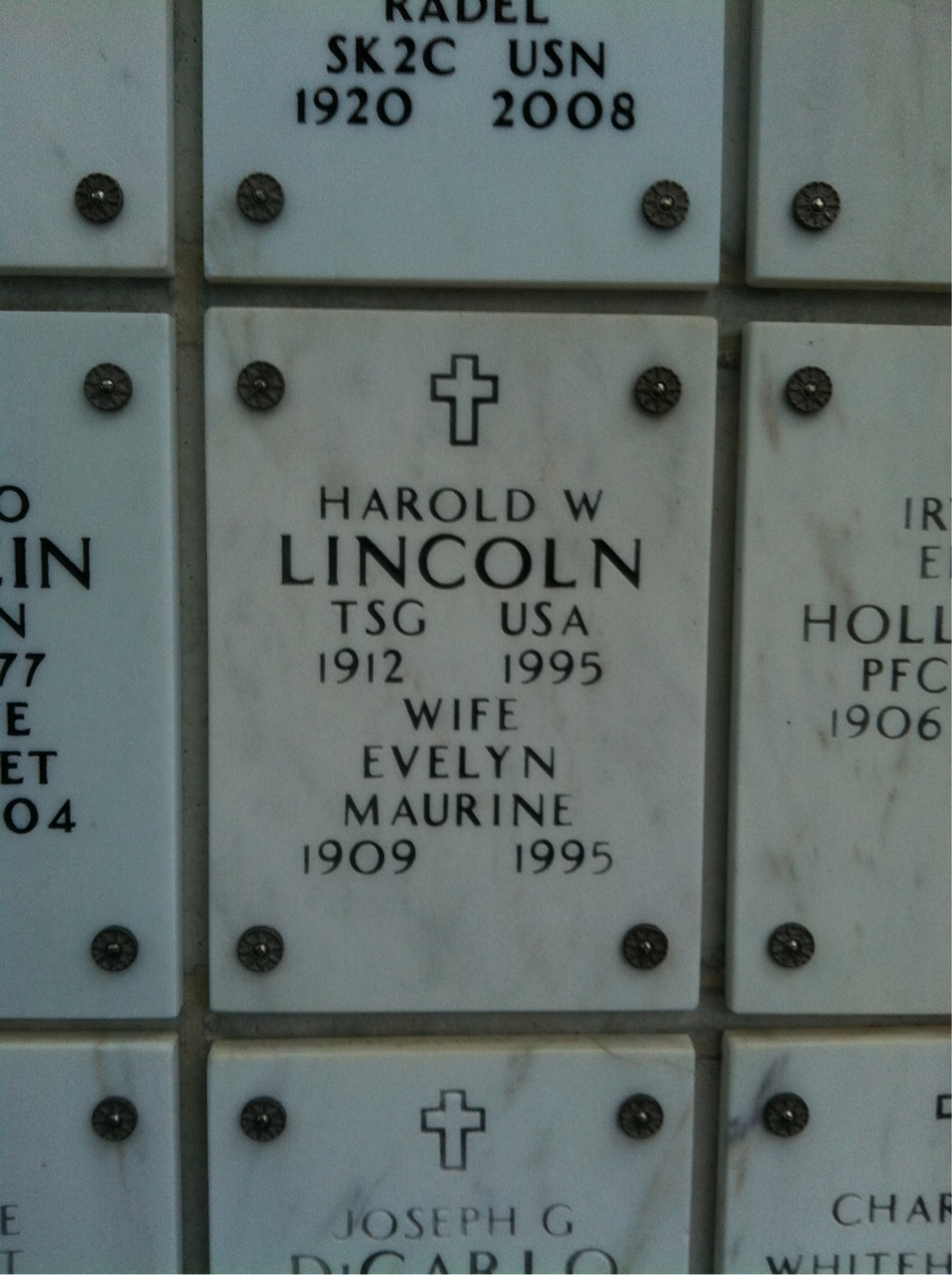
Niche at Arlington National Cemetery

According to the National Archives, Lincoln gave away or sold many of Kennedy's documents and artifacts that she had been entrusted with managing. In 2005, a legal settlement was reached that enabled the National Archives, the Kennedy Library, and Caroline Kennedy to recover thousands of pages of documents and other items. Lincoln died at Georgetown University Hospital in 1995, after complications that followed surgery for cancer. Her ashes were placed in a niche at a columbarium in Arlington National Cemetery.

== Books ==
Lincoln was the author of two books:

- My 12 Years With John F. Kennedy
- Kennedy and Johnson, 1968

== Sources ==
- Dallek, Robert Lyndon B. Johnson: Portrait of a President, p. 142. Oxford University Press, 2003.
- Roth, James M. Reclaiming Pieces of Camelot: How NARA and the JFK Library Recovered Missing Kennedy Documents and Artifacts, Prologue Magazine, Summer 2006, Vol. 38, No. 2.
