= Personal assistant =

Person employed to manage another's professional affairs

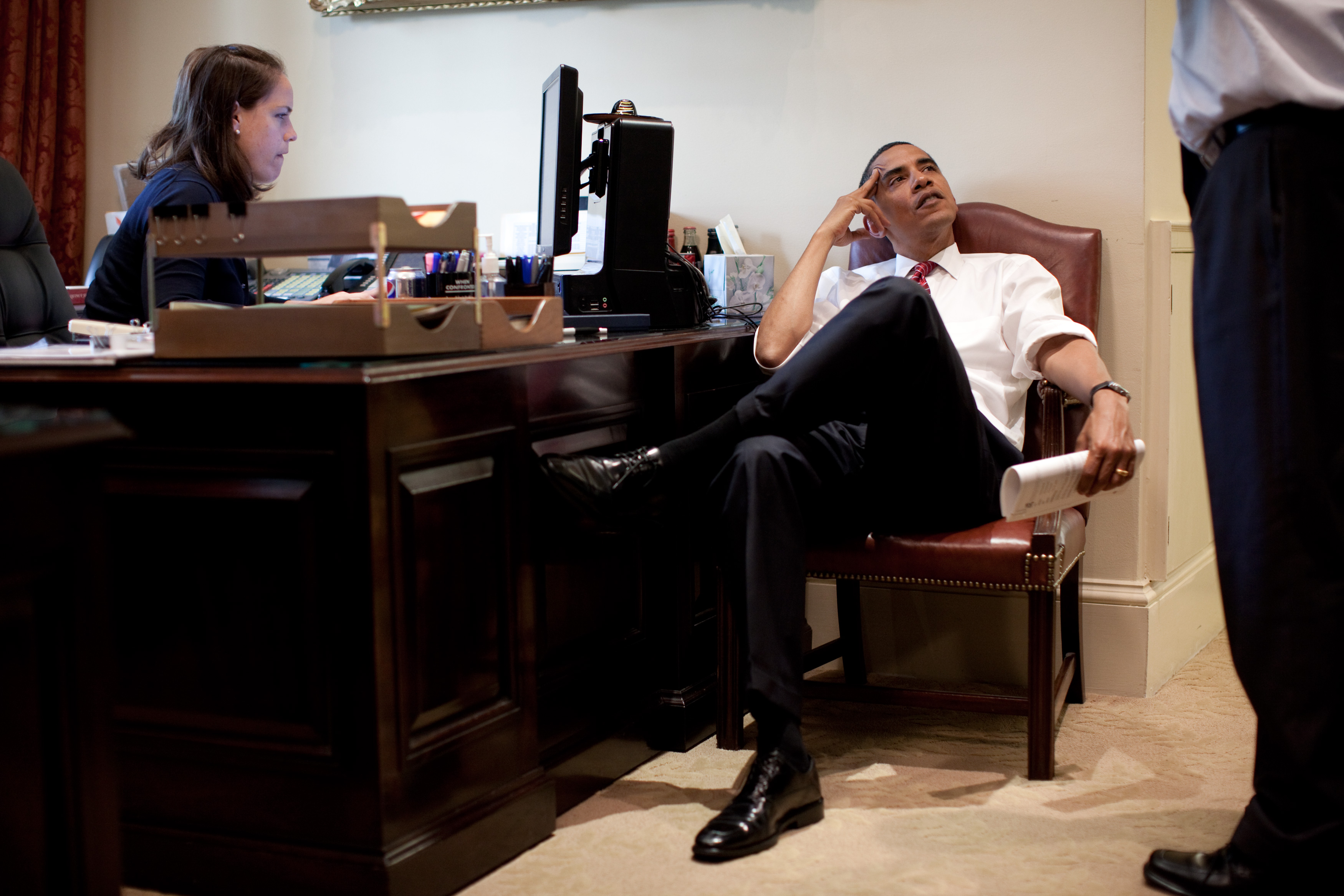
Former U.S. President Barack Obama with Personal Secretary to the President Katie Johnson

A personal assistant, also referred to as personal aide (PA) or personal secretary (PS), is a person employed to assist a specific individual with their daily business or personal tasks. It is a subspecialty of secretarial duties.

== Duties, responsibilities and functions ==
An assistant helps with time and daily management, of meetings, correspondence, and note-taking. The role of a personal assistant can be varied, such as answering phone calls, taking notes, scheduling meetings, emailing, texts, etc.

In business or personal contexts, assistants are people who provide services that relieve their employer from the stress of tasks that are associated with managing one's personal and/or business life. They assist with a variety of life management tasks, including running errands, arranging travel (e.g., travel agent services such as purchasing airline tickets, reserving hotel rooms and rental cars, and arranging activities, as well as handling more localized services such as recommending a different route to work based on road or travel conditions), finance (paying bills, buying and selling stocks), and shopping (meal planning, remembering special occasions like birthdays).

An assistant often acts as the manager's first point of contact with people from both inside and outside the organization. This means that their tasks and skills can often be divided into two fields: technical skills, and personal skills.

Tasks may include but are not limited to:

- devising and maintaining office systems, including data management and filing;
- arranging travel, visas and accommodation and, occasionally, traveling with the manager to take notes or dictation at meetings or to provide general assistance during presentations;
- screening phone calls, inquiries and requests, and handling them when appropriate;
- meeting and greeting visitors at all levels of seniority;
- organizing and maintaining diaries and making appointments;
- dealing with incoming email and post, often corresponding on behalf of the manager;
- taking dictation and minutes;
- carrying out background research and presenting findings;
- producing documents, briefing papers, reports and presentations;
- organizing and attending meetings and ensuring the manager is well prepared for meetings;
- liaising with clients, suppliers and other staff.

In addition to supporting managers, their team and departments, many PA's also have their own personal workload and responsibilities. The scope of the PA's role can be extensive and additional duties may include:

- carrying out specific projects and research;
- responsibility for accounts and budgets;
- taking on some of the manager's responsibilities and working more closely with management;
- deputizing for the manager, making decisions and delegating work to others in the manager's absence;
- being involved in decision-making processes.

=== Time and schedule management ===
- Manages calendars, scheduling appointments, meetings, events, and controlling access to the employer.
- Plans and arranges travel (flights, accommodation, ground transport, visas), sometimes accompanying the employer.

=== Historical background ===
The role of the personal assistant can be traced back to the early 20th century, originating in executive and domestic service contexts where trusted aides were employed to manage correspondence, scheduling, and errands for prominent individuals. As professional environments became more complex and time-sensitive, the assistant's duties expanded beyond clerical support to include logistics coordination, travel planning, and interpersonal liaison functions. Over time, the title evolved in both corporate and personal spheres to reflect a hybrid role encompassing both administrative and managerial responsibilities.

=== Communication and liaison ===
- Serves as primary contact: filters and responds to phone calls, emails, messages and inquiries.
- Welcomes visitors and liaises with clients, suppliers, and internal staff.

=== Documentation and record‑keeping ===
- Takes minutes, dictation, or notes during meetings, and drafts correspondence, reports, briefings, and presentations.
- Maintains filing systems, databases, and other administrative procedures.

=== Research and project support ===
- Conducts background research and delivers summarized findings to support decisions.
- May manage or assist on specific projects as delegated.

=== Financial tasks, errands and logistics ===
- Handles expense reports, bill payments, and basic budgeting.
- Undertakes errands (shopping, meal planning, personal tasks), including household or family support.

=== Confidentiality and adaptability ===
- Works flexibly—including outside normal hours—to adapt to changing needs.
- Handles sensitive and confidential information with discretion and professionalism.

=== Delegation and decision‑making ===
- May deputize for the employer during their absence—making decisions, assigning tasks, or attending meetings.
- Occasionally contributes to organizational or personal decision-making processes.

=== Strategic support and value‑add ===
- Helps identify priorities and restructure schedules to gain time and efficiency, using a partnership dynamic to create strategic space.
- Acts as a gatekeeper ensuring alignment and execution of team and organizational priorities.

=== Skills and attributes ===
Personal assistants commonly display:

- Strong organizational and time‑management skills for juggling complex schedules and responsibilities.
- Excellent communication and interpersonal abilities to liaise effectively across stakeholders.
- Discretion and trustworthiness, essential for confidential matters.
- Adaptability and resilience, including crisis management and flexible work hours.
- Technical proficiency with office software, email platforms, and scheduling tools.

== See also ==
- Teaching assistant
