= Ann C. Whitman =

American presidential secretary (1908–1991)

Ann Whitman
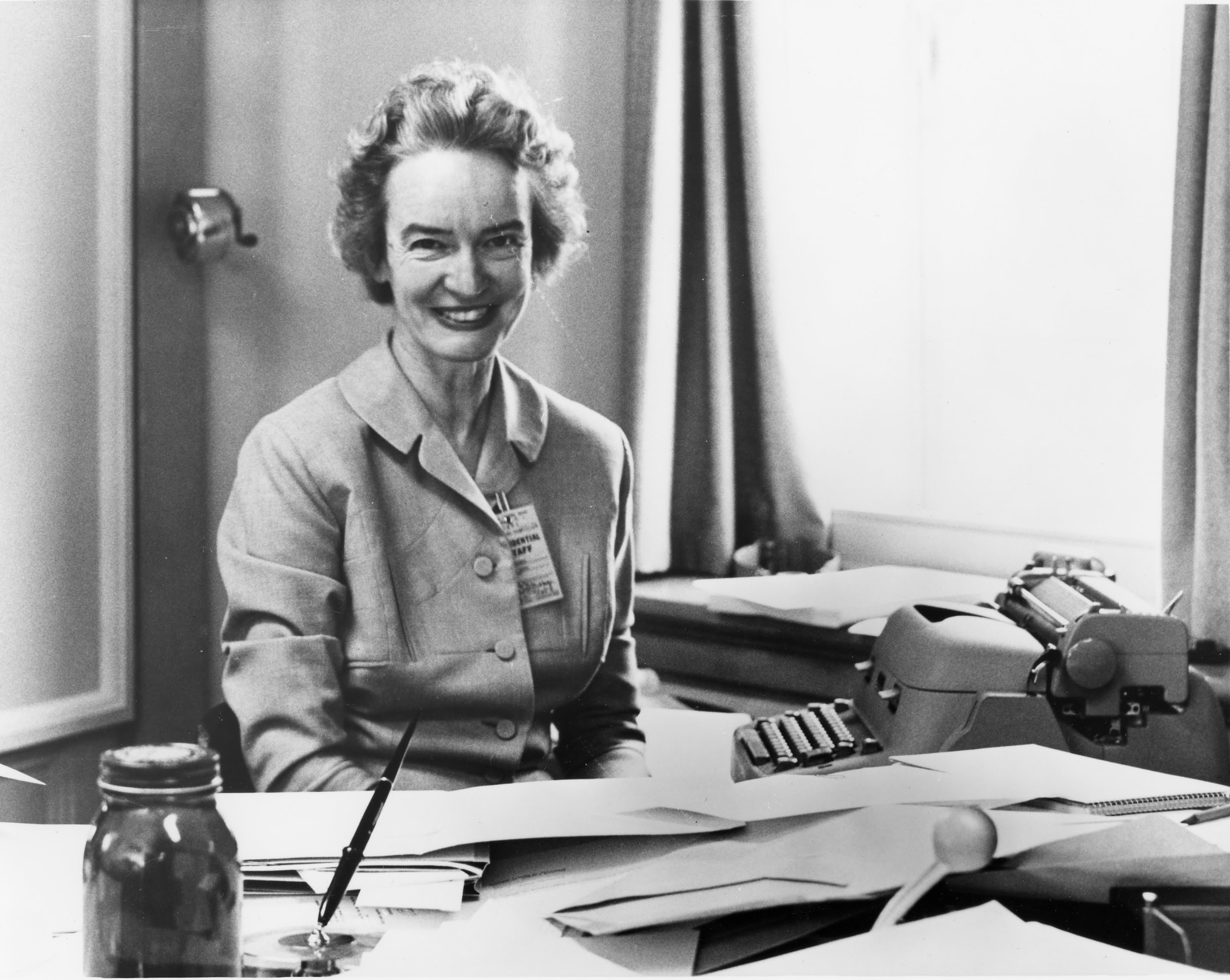
- Whitman in 1958

Assistant to the President Chief of Staff to the Vice President
- In office December 19, 1974 – January 20, 1977
- Vice President: Nelson Rockefeller
- Preceded by: Robert T. Hartmann
- Succeeded by: Richard Moe

Personal Secretary to the President
- In office January 20, 1953 – January 20, 1961
- President: Dwight D. Eisenhower
- Preceded by: Rose Conway
- Succeeded by: Evelyn Lincoln

Personal details
- Born: Anne Cook; June 11, 1908 Perry, Ohio, U.S.
- Died: October 15, 1991 (aged 83) Clearwater, Florida, U.S.
- Party: Republican
- Education: Antioch College (attended)

Ann Cook Whitman (June 11, 1908 – October 15, 1991) was an American secretary and government official who served as chief of staff to the vice president from 1974 to 1977, and personal secretary to President Dwight D. Eisenhower from 1953 to 1961.

== Early life and education ==
Whitman was a native of Perry, Ohio. She briefly attended Antioch College in Yellow Springs, Ohio.

== Career ==
Whitman moved to New York in 1929 to obtain work as a secretary. For many years, she was the personal secretary to David Levy, whose father was one of the founders of Sears, Roebuck and Company.

In 1952, while working as a secretary in the New York office of the Crusade for Freedom, Mrs. Whitman was recruited by Dwight D. Eisenhower’s presidential campaign staff. She went to Eisenhower’s headquarters at Denver, Colorado, where she became Eisenhower’s personal secretary. After Eisenhower was elected president, Whitman accompanied him to Washington, D.C., and served as his personal secretary the entire eight years of his presidency. She helped manage Eisenhower’s correspondence and was responsible for maintaining Eisenhower’s personal files which he kept in his office at the White House. The Ann Whitman File is held at the Eisenhower presidential library and has been deemed an "extraordinary resource" by historians.

When President Eisenhower left office in January 1961, Whitman accompanied him to his farm (now the Eisenhower National Historic Site) in Gettysburg, Pennsylvania, and continued to work for a few months as his personal secretary. She later joined the staff of New York Governor and later Vice President Nelson Rockefeller, for whom she worked until she retired in 1977. A biography of Whitman, entitled Confidential Secretary, was written by journalist Robert Donovan in 1988.

== Personal life ==
In 1941, Whitman married Edmund S. Whitman, an official of the United Fruit Company. They divorced in 1965 and did not have children.
