= Tri-City Airport (Sebring, Ohio) =

- IATA: none; ICAO: none; FAA LID: 3G6

Summary
- Airport type: Public use
- Owner: 3G6 L.L.C.
- Serves: Sebring, Ohio
- Elevation AMSL: 1,188 ft / 362 m
- Coordinates: 40°54′22″N 081°00′00″W

Map
- Location of airport in Ohio 3G6 (the United States)

Runways
Direction	Length		Surface
Direction	ft	m	Surface
17/35	2,768	844	Asphalt

Statistics (2011)
- Aircraft operations: 10,555
- Based aircraft: 28
- Source: Federal Aviation Administration

Tri-City Airport (FAA LID: 3G6) is a privately owned, public use airport located one nautical mile (2 km) southeast of the central business district of Sebring, a village in Mahoning County, Ohio, United States.

== Facilities and aircraft ==
Tri-City Airport covers an area of 45 acres (18 ha) at an elevation of 1,188 feet (362 m) above mean sea level. It has one runway designated 17/35 with an asphalt surface measuring 2,768 by 45 feet (844 x 14 m).

The airport has a fixed-base operator that sells fuel.

For the 12-month period ending August 29, 2011, the airport had 10,555 aircraft operations, an average of 28 per day: 99.5% general aviation, 0.3% air taxi, and 0.2% military. At that time there were 28 aircraft based at this airport: 96% single-engine and 4% multi-engine.

== Accidents and incidents ==
- On June 26, 2015, a Europa XS crashed after departure from the Tri-City Airport. The probable cause of the accident was found to be the pilot’s incapacitation in flight due to a cardiovascular event.
- On January 22, 2017, a Cessna 182 crashed while landing at the Tri-City Airport. After touching down short of the runway, the pilot performed a go-around and elected to land on turf parallel to the paved runway. After touching down on the turf, the airplane nosed over. The probable cause of the accident was found to be the pilot’s failure to maintain the proper glidepath during landing, which resulted in the airplane landing short of the runway, the nose landing gear separating, and the airplane nosing over during a second landing.
- On October 16, 2020, a Piper Cherokee crashed due to engine issues while on approach to the Tri-City Airport.

== See also ==
- List of airports in Ohio
