= Sebring Local School District =

School district in Ohio, United States

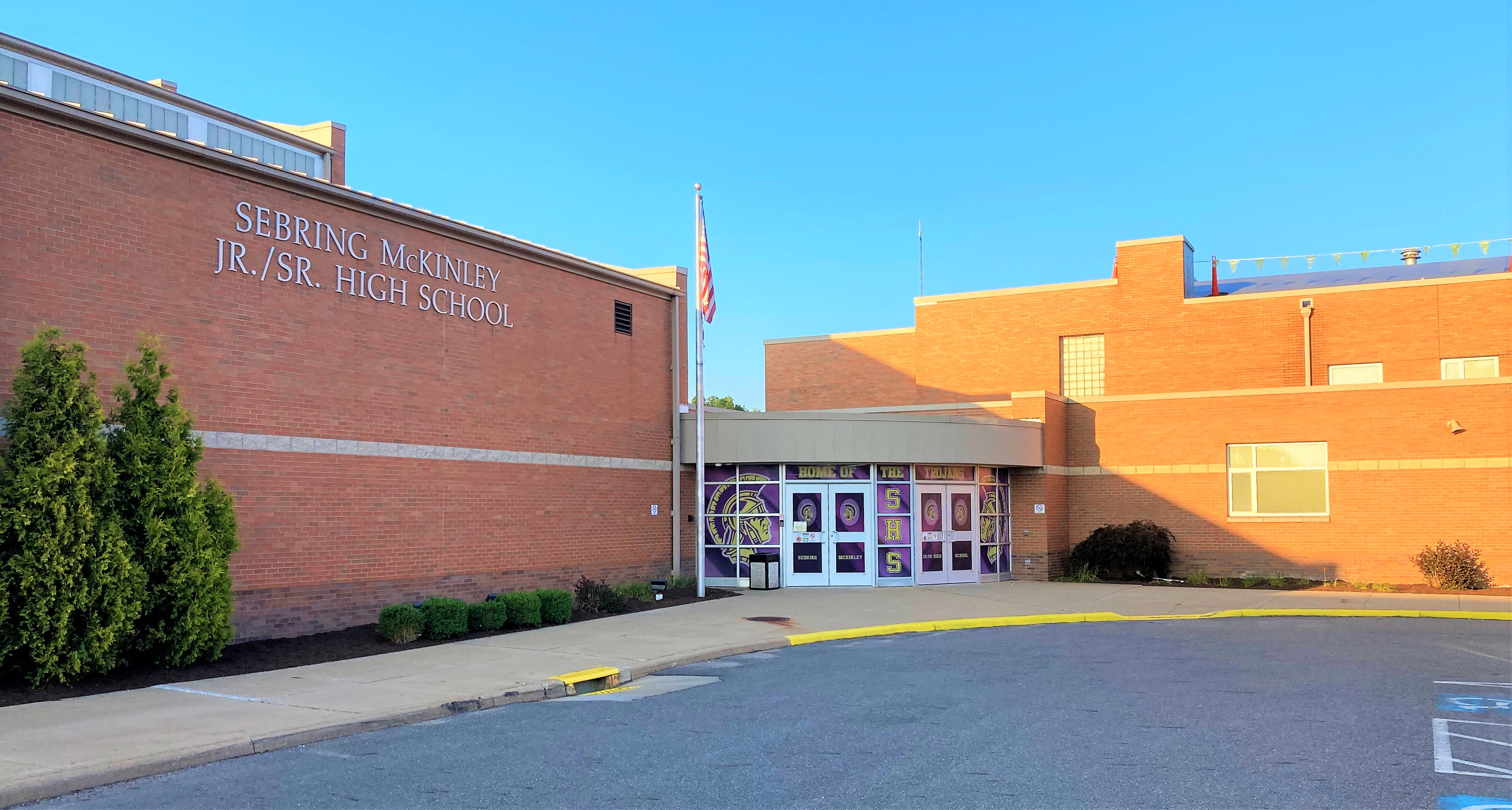
- McKinley High School entrance

Address
- 510 N 14th St Sebring, Ohio, 44672; United States

District information
- Type: Public
- Grades: K-12
- Accreditation: Ohio Department of Education
- NCES District ID: 3904835

Students and staff
- Enrollment: 360 (2024–25)
- Staff: 33.44 (FTE)
- Student–teacher ratio: 10.77
- District mascot: Trojans
- Colors: Purple and gold

Other information
- Website: www.sebring.k12.oh.us

The Sebring Local School District is a school district located in southeastern Mahoning County, Ohio and a small portion of Portage County. The school district serves students in grades K-12 living in Sebring, Smith, Green, and Deerfield townships. The district consists of one junior/senior high school and one elementary school. All buildings and offices are located in Sebring, Ohio.

== History ==
Sebring Local Schools was formed in the early 1900s. The school district originally consisted of two high schools, East Ohio Ave High School, built in 1901 and Lincoln High School, built in 1909. McKinley School and Southside Elementary was built in 1914. In 1923, Lincoln and East Ohio Ave High Schools were consolidated into the McKinley building, which became Sebring McKinley High School. Lincoln and East Ohio Schools were later used as elementary schools. East Ohio School was closed in 1938.

McKinley underwent several expansion projects following the consolidations of East Ohio and Lincoln, such as a second floor and auditorium in 1923, a gymnasium in 1937 and the northeast wing in 1955.

B.L. Elementary School was built in 1967 on West Virginia Ave, which consolidated all elementary students within the district. Southside Elementary and Lincoln were closed the same year.

In the late 1990s, a new high school for Sebring was built at its current East Indiana Ave Location. It was later renovated in 2001, which added a new auditorium, cafeteria, computer lab, nine new classrooms and two new science rooms.

== Schools ==
=== High school ===
- McKinley High School

=== Elementary school ===
- B.L. Miller Elementary School

=== Former schools ===
- Lincoln High School
- Ohio Ave High School
- Southside Elementary School
