= Ashley Estes Kavanaugh =

American public official

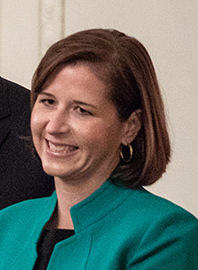
- Kavanaugh in 2018

Personal Secretary to the President
- In office January 20, 2001 – January 20, 2005
- President: George W. Bush
- Preceded by: Betty Currie
- Succeeded by: Karen E. Keller

Personal details
- Born: Ashley Jean Estes Abilene, Texas, U.S.
- Party: Republican
- Spouse: Brett Kavanaugh (m. 2004)
- Children: 2
- Education: University of Texas at Austin (BA)

Ashley Estes Kavanaugh is an American public official and former political aide. She is married to Supreme Court Justice Brett Kavanaugh.

== Early life and education ==
Kavanaugh was born Ashley Jean Estes in Abilene, Texas. She graduated from Abilene Cooper High School in 1993, where she was a member of the Student Council for three years and played golf for three years. She attended the University of Texas at Austin, beginning in 1993, and graduated in 1997 with a Bachelor of Journalism degree.

In 2004, she married fellow West Wing staff member Brett Kavanaugh. Both President Bush and First Lady Laura Bush attended the wedding ceremony in Georgetown, Washington, D.C.

== Career ==
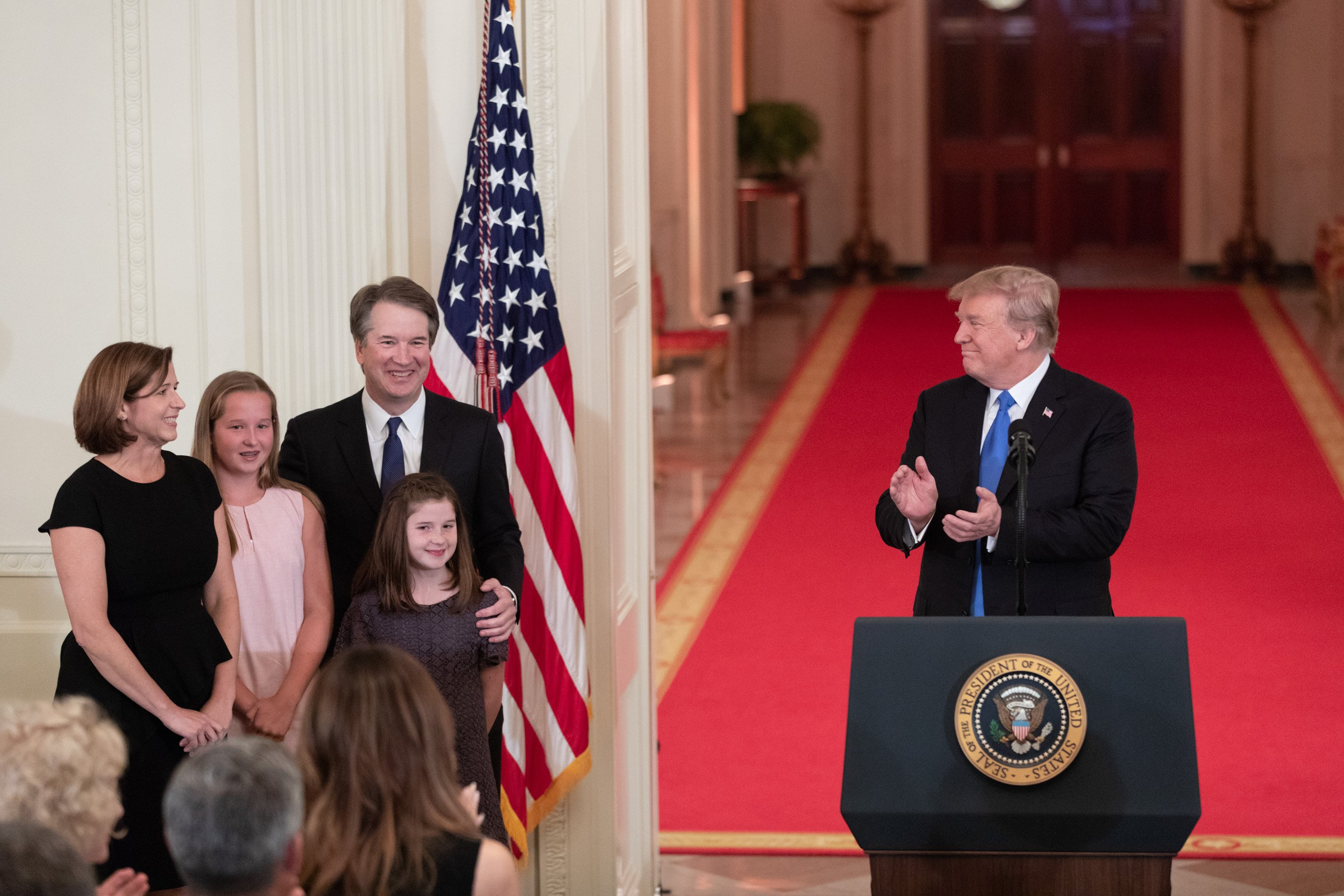
The Kavanaugh family with President Donald Trump

Kavanaugh served as an assistant to George W. Bush from 1996 through 1999, during his tenure as Governor of Texas and in the George W. Bush 2000 presidential campaign. When Bush became president in January 2001, Kavanaugh took the position of Personal Secretary to the President, serving in the position until 2004.

Kavanaugh was Director of Special Projects at the George W. Bush Presidential Foundation from 2005 to 2009, and then Media Relations Coordinator at the George W. Bush Presidential Center from 2009 to 2010.

Starting in 2016, Kavanaugh served for a time as town manager of the village of Chevy Chase Section Five, Maryland, taking over for acting town manager John Higgins.
