= Rose Mary Woods =

Personal secretary to President Richard Nixon (1917-2005)

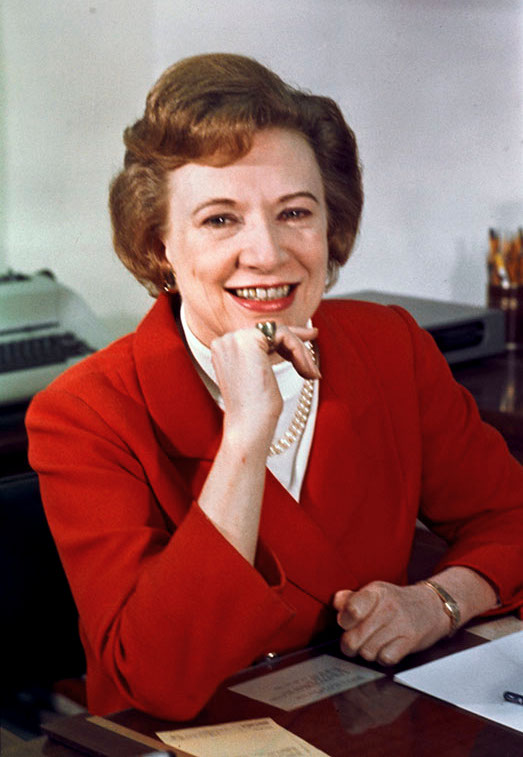
- Woods, 1970s

Personal Secretary to the President
- In office January 20, 1969 – August 9, 1974
- President: Richard Nixon
- Preceded by: Gerri Whittington
- Succeeded by: Dorothy E. Downton

Personal details
- Born: December 26, 1917 Sebring, Ohio, U.S.
- Died: January 22, 2005 (aged 87) Alliance, Ohio, U.S.
- Party: Republican

Rose Mary Woods (December 26, 1917 – January 22, 2005) was Richard Nixon's secretary from his days in Congress in 1951 through the end of his political career. Before H. R. Haldeman and John Ehrlichman became the operators of Nixon's presidential campaign, Woods was known as Nixon's gatekeeper.

== Early life and connection to Nixon ==
Rose Mary Woods was born in northeastern Ohio in the small pottery town of Sebring on December 26, 1917. Her brother was Joseph I. Woods, a sheriff of Cook County, Illinois, and longtime member of the Cook County Board.

Following graduation from McKinley High School, Woods worked for Royal China, Inc., the city's largest employer. She had been engaged to marry, but her fiancé died during World War II. To escape the memories of her hometown, she moved to Washington, D.C. in 1943, working in a variety of federal offices until she met Nixon while she was a secretary to the House Select Committee on Foreign Aid. Impressed by his neatness and efficiency, she accepted his job offer in 1951.

Woods developed a very close relationship with the Nixon family, especially with First Lady Pat Nixon. She accompanied Vice President Nixon on his 1958 goodwill tour of South America but was injured by flying glass in the attack on Nixon's motorcade.

== Secretary to the President of the United States ==
Woods was President Nixon's personal secretary, the same position that she held from the time that he hired her until the end of his lengthy political career.

Fiercely loyal to Nixon, Woods claimed responsibility in a 1974 grand jury testimony for inadvertently erasing up to five minutes of the 18½ minute gap on a June 20, 1972, audio tape. Her demonstration of how this might have occurred, in which she stretched to simultaneously press controls several feet apart (what the press dubbed the "Rose Mary Stretch"), was met with skepticism from those who believed the erasures to be deliberate.

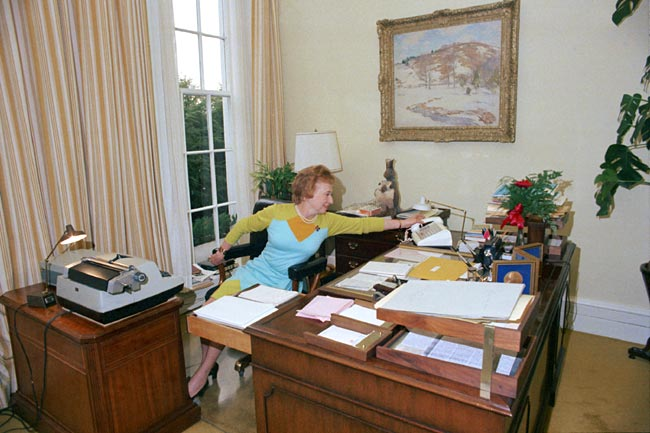
Woods demonstrates the "Rose Mary Stretch", which purportedly led to the erasure of 18-plus minutes of the Watergate tapes.

An expert analysis of the tapes conducted in January 1974 revealed that there were four or five separate erasures, and perhaps as many as nine. The contents of the gaps remain unknown.

After Nixon's resignation from the presidency, Woods maintained a sort of secret shrine to his memory in the Executive Office Building until she was ordered to remove it.

== Death ==
External videos
- Rose Mary Woods, Devoted Nixon Secretary, Dies, 2:20, January 24, 2005, NPR

Woods died on January 22, 2005, at McCrea Manor, a nursing home in Alliance, Ohio, near her hometown. A memorial service was held at the Richard Nixon Presidential Library and Museum in Yorba Linda, California. She had remained unmarried and had no children.

== See also ==
- Fawn Hall
- Manolo Sanchez (Nixon staff member)
