= Anita Decker Breckenridge =

American government official

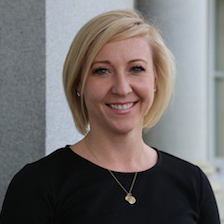

White House Deputy Chief of Staff for Operations
- In office May 22, 2014 – January 20, 2017
- President: Barack Obama
- Preceded by: Alyssa Mastromonaco
- Succeeded by: Joe Hagin

Personal Secretary to the President
- In office June 10, 2011 – May 22, 2014
- President: Barack Obama
- Preceded by: Katie Johnson
- Succeeded by: Ferial Govashiri

Personal details
- Born: Anita Decker; July 19, 1978 (age 48) Kenilworth, Illinois, U.S.
- Party: Democratic
- Spouse: Russell Breckenridge (m. 2010)
- Education: University of Arizona (BA)

Anita Decker Breckenridge (born July 19, 1978) is an American political staffer who served in a number of positions in the administration of President Barack Obama. She was appointed White House Deputy Chief of Staff for Operations in March 2014, a position she took up in May 2014.

In January 2017, Breckenridge was named Chief of Staff for Barack Obama's post-presidency office. Her portfolio includes the Obama Foundation and Obama presidential library. She also oversees the presidential records process.

== Early life ==
Breckenridge was born and spent her early years in Kenilworth, Illinois. She graduated from New Trier High School in Winnetka, Illinois in 1996; while at high school she was an intern for US Senator Dick Durbin. She studied political science at the University of Arizona, graduating in 2000.

== Career ==
She worked for Representative Lane Evans, and in 2003 moved to work for Obama, who was then a member of the Illinois Senate. She ran all of Obama's Downstate Illinois offices when he was US Senator for the state, and managed the 2007 announcement of his candidacy for President.

After his election she served as Chief of Staff at the National Endowment for the Arts until May 2011, when she became personal secretary to the President, taking over from Katie Johnson.

In March 2014 the White House announced she would become Deputy Chief of Staff for Operations, replacing Alyssa Mastromonaco.

== Personal life ==
She married political consultant Russell Breckenridge in 2010.

Political offices
Preceded by Katie Johnson	Personal Secretary to the President; 2011–2014	Succeeded by Ferial Govashiri
Preceded by Alyssa Mastromonaco	White House Deputy Chief of Staff for Operations; 2014–2017	Succeeded by Joe Hagin
