= McKinley High School (Sebring, Ohio) =

Public high school in Sebring, Ohio, United States

Coordinates: 40°55′34″N 81°00′57″W

Sebring McKinley High School
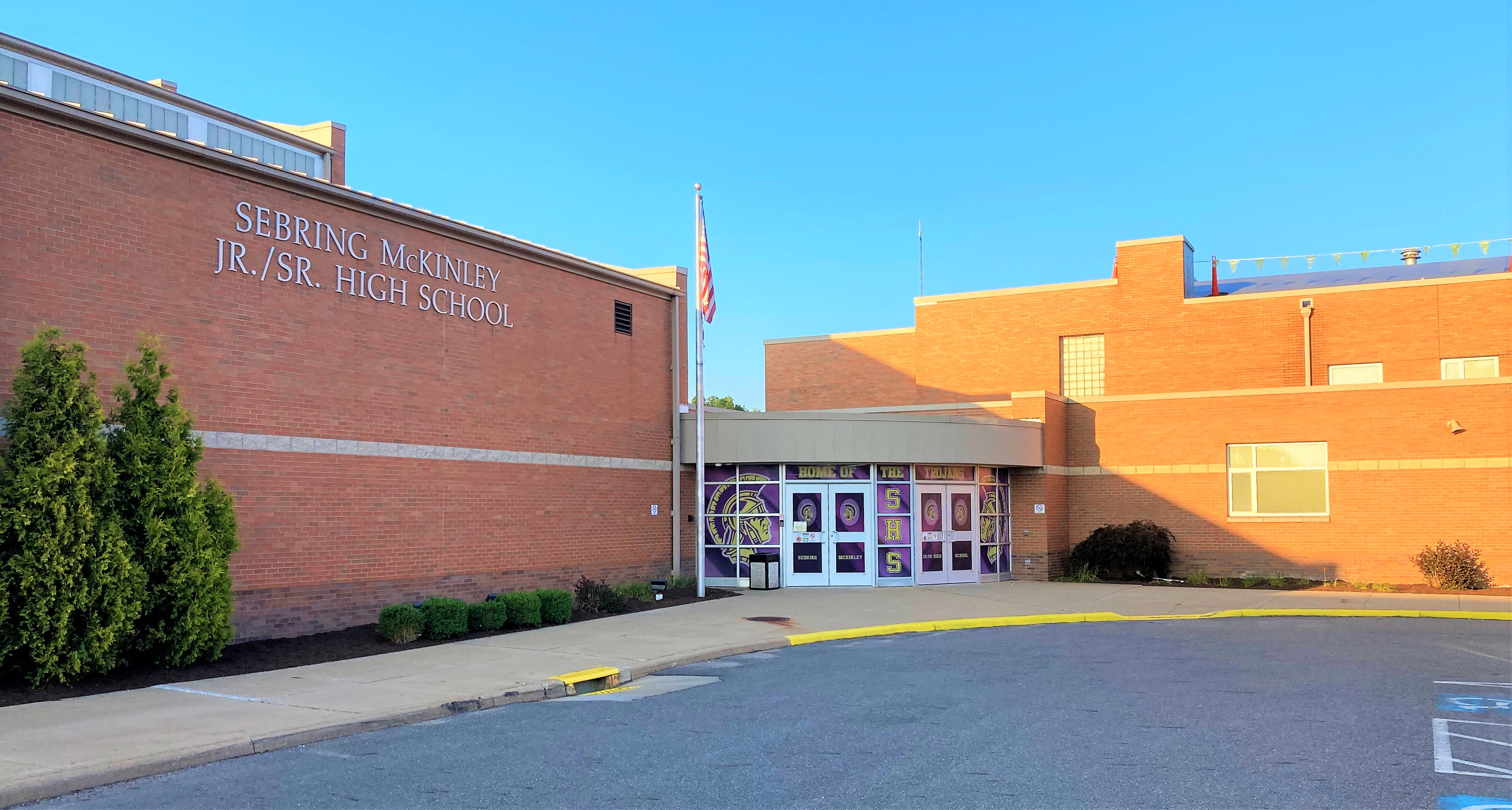

Location
- 225 East Indiana Avenue; Sebring, Ohio 44672; United States

Information
- Type: Public
- Established: 1914
- School district: Sebring Local School District
- NCES School ID: 390483503222
- Principal: Brian Clark
- Teaching staff: 17.10 (on an FTE basis)
- Grades: 6–12
- Enrollment: 147 (2024–25)
- Student to teacher ratio: 8.60
- Colors: Purple and gold
- Athletics conference: Mahoning Valley Athletic Conference; Northern 8 Football Conference (football only)
- Team name: Trojans
- Website: mhs.sebring.k12.oh.us/o/mhs

McKinley High School is a public high school located in Sebring, Ohio It is the only high school in the Sebring Local School District. Athletic teams are known as the Trojans, and they compete in the Mahoning Valley Athletic Conference and Northern 8 Football Conference as a member of the Ohio High School Athletic Association.

== History ==
In 1909, at the cost of approximately $20,000, the Lincoln Building was built, serving as the original McKinely High School. By the early 1920s, the growing student population led to the consolidation of the community's secondary schools. Beginning in 1924, the McKinley building, which previously served as the school district's elementary building, became the villages main high school facility. That same year saw the addition of an auditorium, costing around $120,000, followed by classrooms and office expansions, costing approximately $85,000. Athletic facilities such as a gymnasium and football stadium were later added on through the United States WPA program.

In the late 1990s, the school district constructed a new junior-senior high school on East Indiana Avenue to replace the aging historic building. The facility underwent additional renovations in 2001, which included the addition of a new auditorium, cafeteria, science rooms, computer laboratory, and several classrooms.

== Athletics ==
Sebring McKinley High School offers

- Baseball
- Basketball
- Cross country
- Cheerleading
- Football (8-man)
- Golf
- Track and field
- Softball
- Volleyball

=== Associated Press poll winners ===
- Boys basketball - 1999

== Notable alumni ==
- Judith L. French (class of 1980) - Ohio Supreme Court judge
- Rose Mary Woods - former personal secretary to former U.S. President Richard Nixon
