= Gerri Whittington =

First African-American secretary in the White House

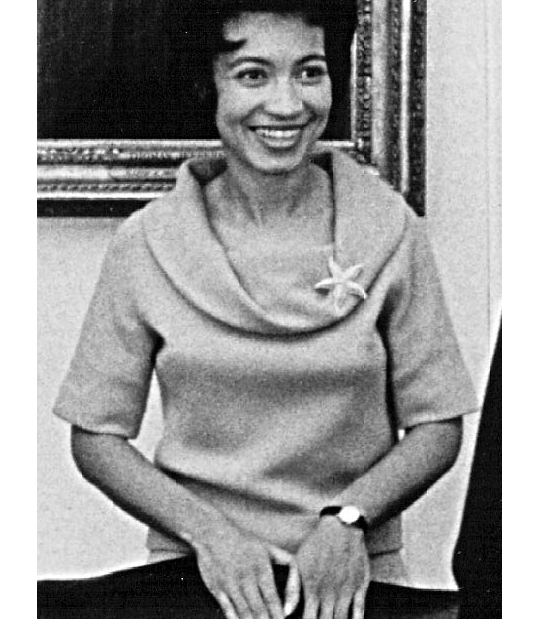

Personal Secretary to the President
- In office November 22, 1963 – January 20, 1969
- President: Lyndon B. Johnson
- Preceded by: Evelyn Lincoln
- Succeeded by: Rose Mary Woods

Personal details
- Born: September 11, 1931 West River, Maryland, U.S.
- Died: January 24, 1993 (aged 61) Washington, D.C., U.S.
- Party: Democratic

Geraldine Whittington (September 11, 1931 – January 24, 1993) was the personal executive secretary to President Lyndon B. Johnson, and was the first African-American secretary in the White House.

Johnson was famous for working long hours and insisting his assistants worked long hours as well. When John F. Kennedy was assassinated and Johnson became president, he requested a new slate of secretaries. He saw Whittington working in a government office, and requested that his assistant Jack Valenti get her home phone number. Johnson called her unannounced one evening, and requested that she come in that night for an interview. According to audiotapes of Johnson's phone calls, Whittington at first thought the call was a joke, but came to believe that it really was the president on the line. She applied for the job and was offered the position.

Having a black woman in the White House was very unusual in the early 1960s. At a New Year's party in 1963-1964, Johnson invited three of his secretaries, Marie Fehmer, Juanita Roberts and also Whittington, to the Forty Acres Club at the University of Texas at Austin. When he danced with Whittington, it was interpreted by some as the desegregation of an important Southern social institution.

Johnson wanted to advertise the fact that he had hired a black woman, but chose not to call a news conference. Instead, he arranged for Whittington to appear on the television game show "What's My Line?", wherein contestants attempted to guess her profession. This may have seemed less overt, but probably exposed her to more viewers than if a standard press conference had been held.

Whittington appeared on episode #696 of the game show What's My Line? on January 19, 1964. She was the first contestant. The mystery guest that evening was Van Heflin and the panel consisted of Arlene Francis, Steve Allen, Dorothy Kilgallen, and Bennett Cerf. After Whittington signed the blackboard as "Jerri Whittington," she told host John Daly that she was from West River, Maryland. Whittington's occupation was shown on the screen as "Secretary to President Johnson." After her game, she described President Lyndon Johnson with the following words, "great warmth, fair, kind, a perfectionist."

Later Whittington appeared in several magazines, including Jet and Sepia.

She was the first person to learn that Justice Thurgood Marshall had been nominated by President Johnson to the Supreme Court. Minutes before LBJ made the official announcement, he took his nominee down to her office and said, "Here's the next Supreme Court Justice!" She told friends that she thanked the President for making the choice of the first Black court justice.

After suffering a stroke at age 38, Ms. Whittington died of cancer at age 61 in Washington, DC, on January 24, 1993, on the same day as Justice Thurgood Marshall.
