= Rose Conway =

Secretary for U.S. president Harry Truman

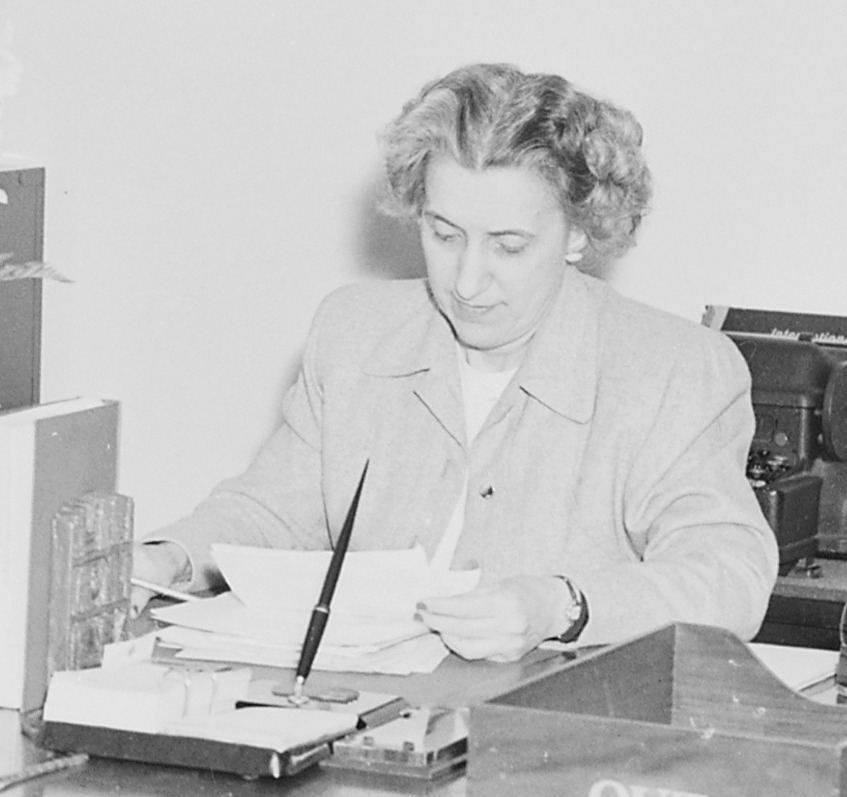
- Conway in 1947

Personal Secretary to the President
- In office April 12, 1945 – January 20, 1953
- President: Harry Truman
- Preceded by: Grace Tully
- Succeeded by: Ann C. Whitman

Personal details
- Born: 1900 Emporia, Kansas, U.S.
- Died: March 17, 1980 (aged 79–80) Kansas City, Missouri, U.S.
- Party: Democratic
- Education: Benedictine College (BA)

Rose A. Conway (1900 – March 17, 1980) was an American political aide who served as the personal secretary to United States President Harry S. Truman from 1945 until 1953. Conway has been referred to as "President Truman's Secret Weapon."

== Early life and education ==
Conway was born in Emporia, Kansas in 1900 and moved to Kansas City with her parents as a baby. Conway graduated from Benedictine College and attended business school in Kansas City.

== Career ==
After business school, Conway then became a secretary for her uncle, a banker.

For a time Conway worked for an insurance executive and then for ten years as secretary to John Vivian Truman, district director of the Kansas City Area Federal Housing Administration. John Vivian told his brother, Harry S. Truman, then a United States Senator, about Rose's efficiency.

=== White House ===
In February 1945, after Truman became Vice President of the United States, he asked Rose to join his Washington staff. She reported for duty in March. Less than a month later, Franklin D. Roosevelt died.

Conway was a highly dedicated and loyal member of Truman's staff, even working with him from his hospital bedside during illnesses and, at times, assisting with financial bookkeeping for the Truman's Executive Residence. Conway was referred to as "zipper lip" by staffers and reporters on Capitol Hill. Truman said of Conway, “No man ever had a more loyal secretary and one who knows the score."

=== Later career ===
In 1949, Conway received an honorary doctor of law degree and was named as a “Woman of Achievement” by the Kansas City chapter of Theta Sigma Phi, national honorary for women in journalism.

After Truman left office in 1953, Conway continued to serve as secretary for the Truman Office and later Harry S. Truman Presidential Library and Museum until her retirement in 1975. Conway was one of the few people to attend Truman's private burial service in 1972.

The Truman Library Institute made Conway an honorary member after her retirement. In 1977, she was declared an honorary member of Battery D, 129th Field Artillery, the unit that Truman had commanded in World War I.

== Death ==
On March 17, 1980, Conway died at her home in Kansas City, Missouri.
