= Katie Johnson (secretary) =

Served as the personal secretary to United States President Barack Obama

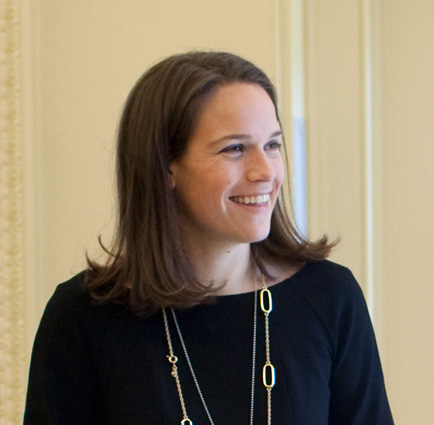

Personal Secretary to the President
- In office January 20, 2009 – June 10, 2011
- President: Barack Obama
- Preceded by: Karen E. Keller
- Succeeded by: Anita Decker

Personal details
- Born: March 26, 1981 (age 45)
- Party: Democratic
- Education: Wellesley College (BA); Harvard University (JD)

Katherine B. Johnson (born March 26, 1981) served as the personal secretary to United States President Barack Obama from 2009 to 2011.

== Personal life ==
Johnson grew up in Bethesda, Maryland, and moved with her parents to Brookline, Massachusetts, in 1999 before entering Wellesley College. She is the oldest of three children of Dr. Bruce E. Johnson, head of thoracic oncology at Dana–Farber Cancer Institute, and Georgia M. Johnson, a management consultant and an elected Town Meeting member in Brookline.

Johnson graduated from Wellesley College in 2003 with a Bachelor of Arts degree in political science. Prior to her post as personal secretary to the president, Johnson was Rahm Emanuel's special assistant for two years when he led the Democratic Congressional Campaign Committee, and also served as Barack Obama campaign manager David Plouffe's assistant.

Johnson was one of several junior staffers who left the White House in 2011 to attend Harvard Law School. Her last day as secretary was June 10, 2011.

== Post-secretarial career ==
Johnson returned to the White House as a Counselor in the Office of Management and Budget. She graduated from Harvard Law School in 2014 and is currently a partner in the Washington, D.C. office of Jenner & Block.

== Gallery ==
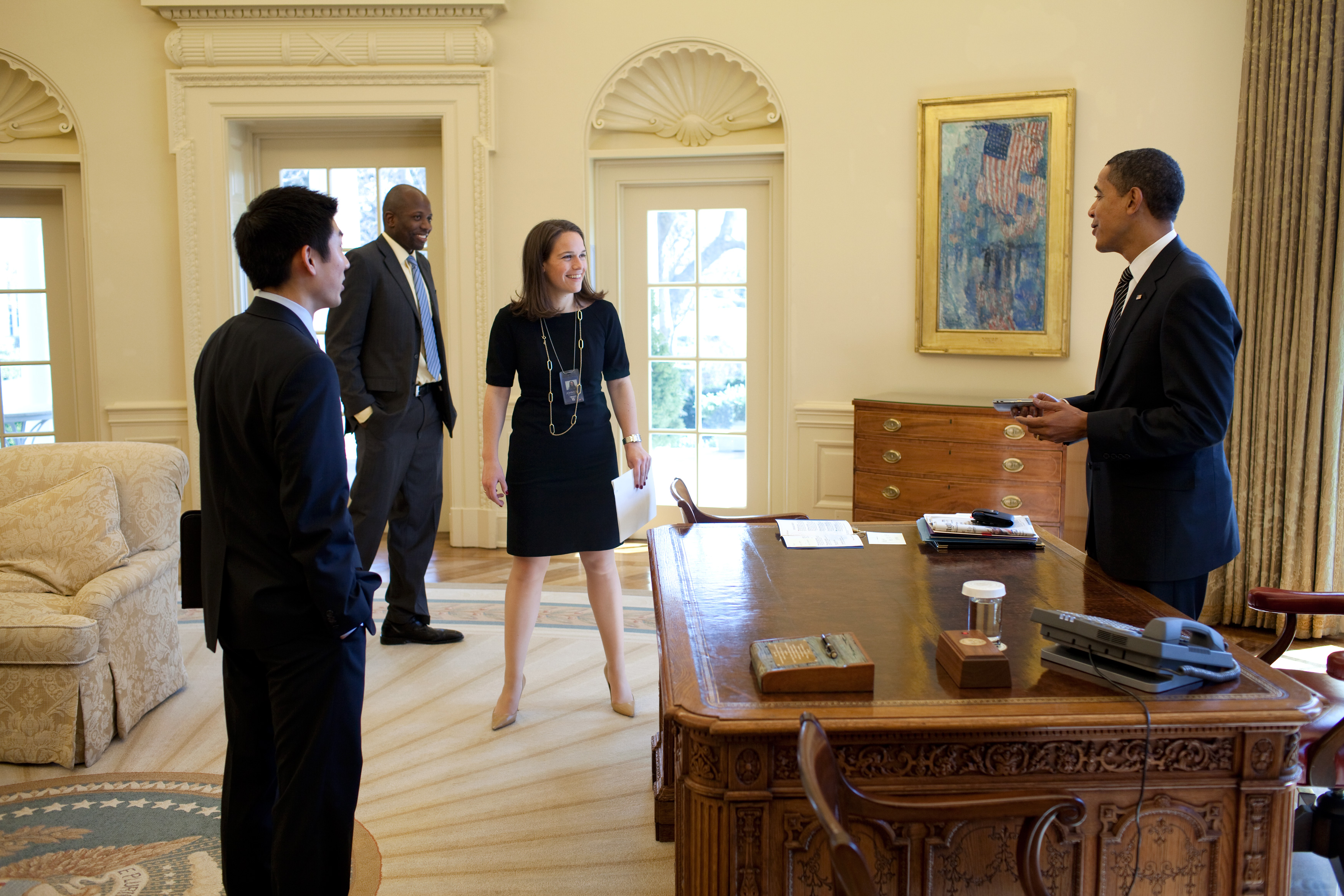
President Barack Obama jokes with Special Assistant Eugene Kang, Personal Secretary Katie Johnson and Personal Aide Reggie Love in the Oval Office.

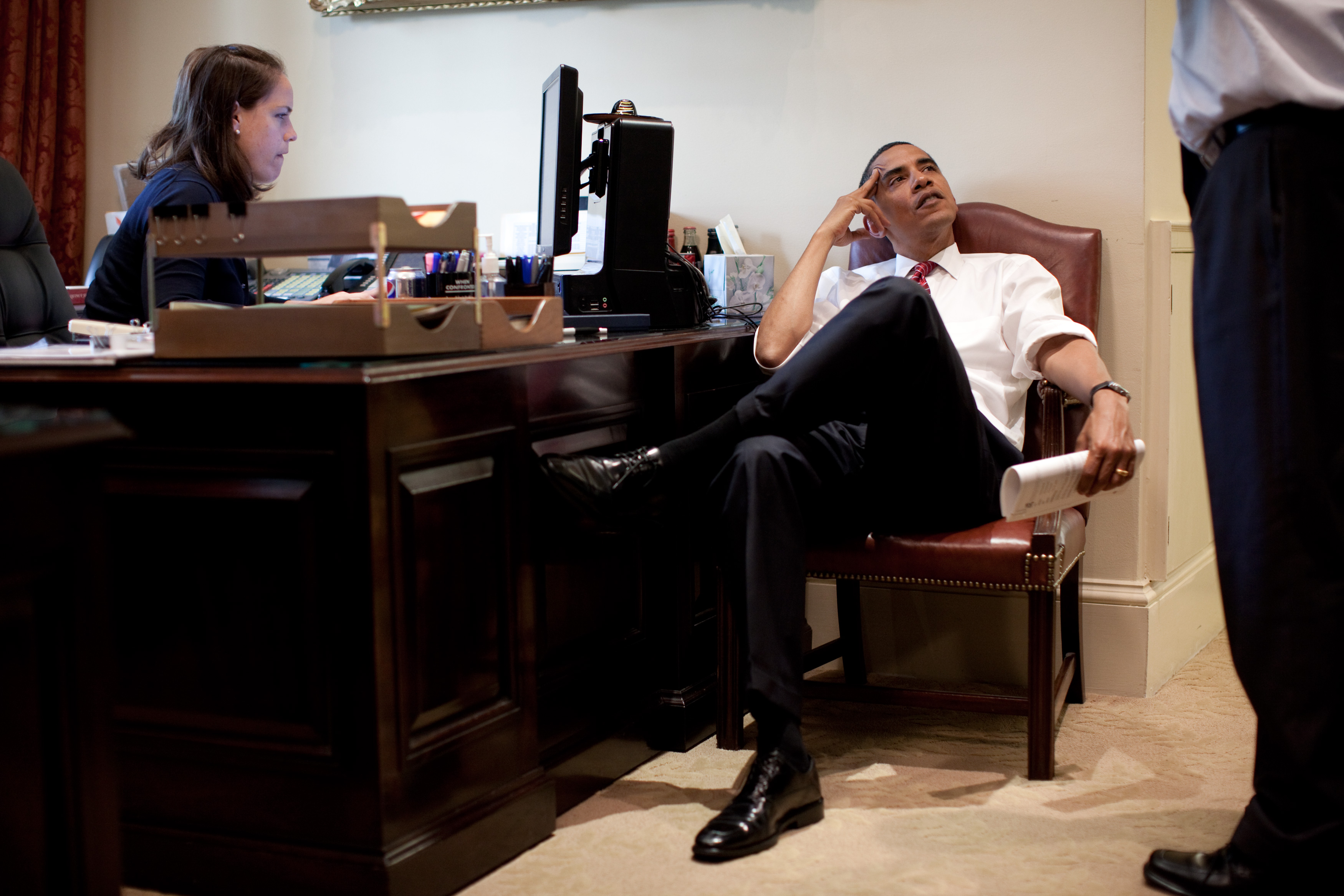
President Barack Obama listens to Senior Advisor David Axelrod in the outer Oval Office on June 26, 2009. At left is Personal Secretary Katie Johnson.

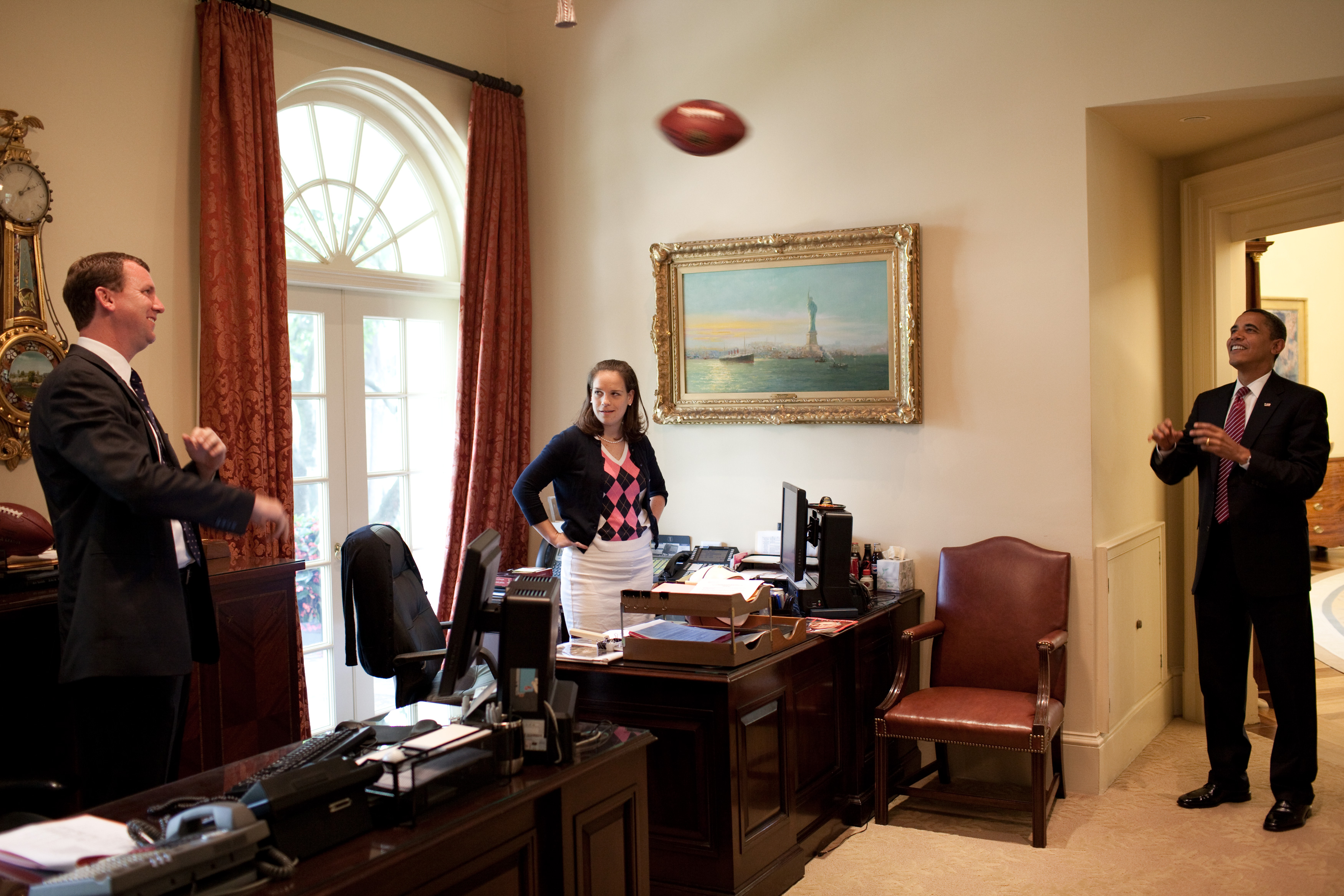
President Barack Obama tosses a football with Trip Director Marvin Nicholson in the outer Oval Office on June 26, 2009. Personal Secretary Katie Johnson watches from her desk.

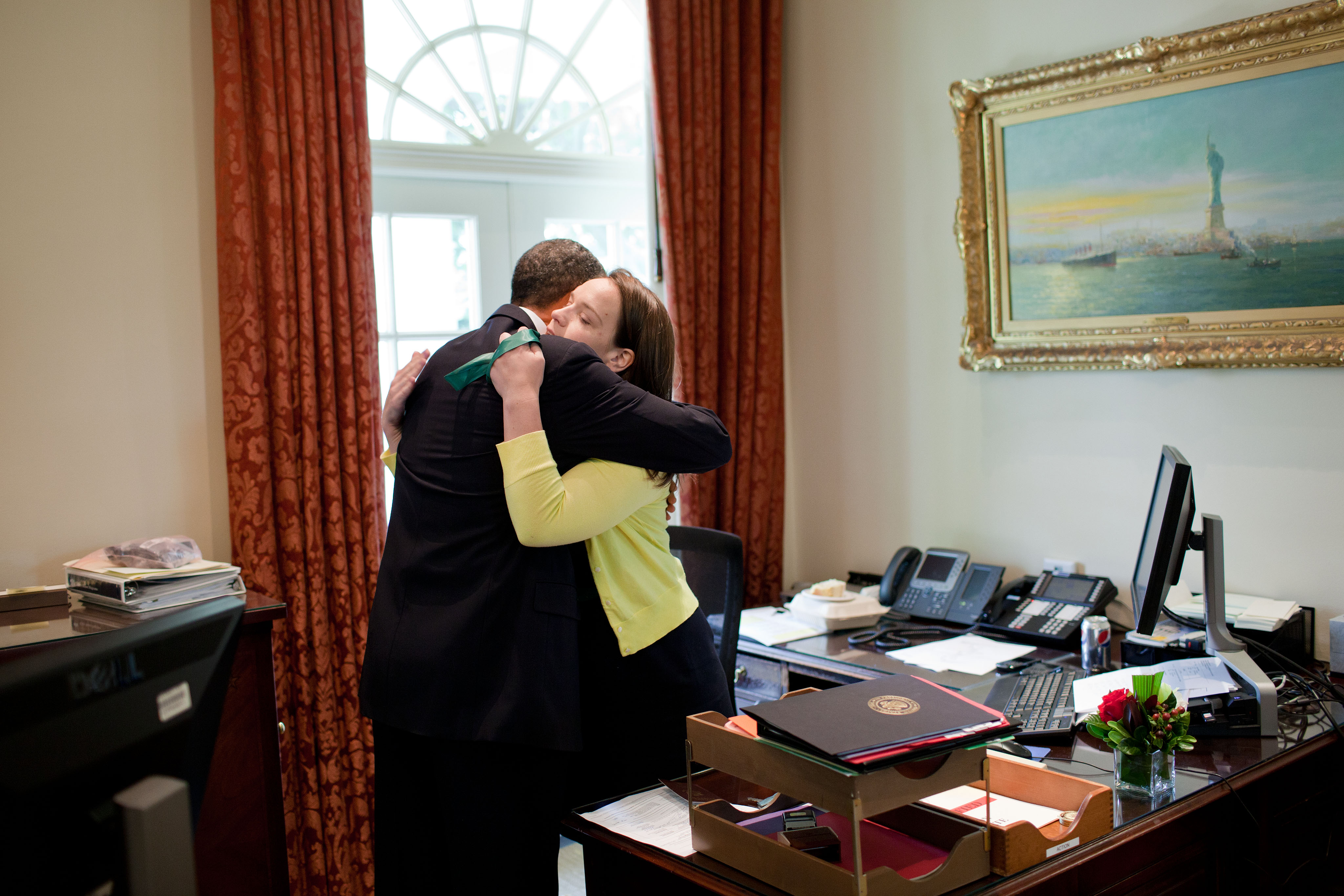
President Barack Obama bids farewell to Personal Secretary Katie Johnson on her last day at the White House, June 10, 2011
