= Beau Harrison =

American political aide (born 1993)

White House Deputy Chief of Staff for Operations
- Incumbent
- Assumed office January 20, 2025
- President: Donald Trump
- Preceded by: Annie Tomasini

Personal details
- Born: William Blalock Harrison; January 20, 1993 (age 33)
- Party: Republican
- Spouse: Hayley D'Antuono (m. 2022)

William Blalock "Beau" Harrison (born January 20, 1993) is an American political aide who has served as the White House deputy chief of staff for operations since 2025.

== Early life ==
William Blalock Harrison was born on January 20, 1993.

== Career ==
=== Political aide (2017–2021) ===
By March 2017, Harrison had been working in the first Trump administration. After serving as a special assistant to the deputy chief of staff for operations, Daniel Walsh, he was named as a special assistant to the president for operations in February 2019. He was later named as a deputy assistant to the president for operations.

=== Post-government work (2021–2024) ===
After the inauguration of Joe Biden, Harrison moved to West Palm Beach, Florida, to assist outgoing president Donald Trump in his transition process. He handled logistics for Trump's move from Washington, D.C. to West Palm Beach, including bringing Walt Nauta to Mar-a-Lago. In late 2021, Harrison began working for Trump's post-presidential office. Harrison was among several aides interviewed in the FBI investigation into Trump's handling of government documents that year, according to CNN. In September, The New York Times reported that Harrison had received a subpoena related to the finances of Save America PAC, in the Smith special counsel investigation into efforts to overturn the 2020 presidential election. In December, he appeared before a grand jury in the Smith special counsel investigation into documents at Mar-a-Lago. Harrison was a witness to exchanges described by Cassidy Hutchinson to the House Select Committee to Investigate the January 6th Attack on the United States Capitol.

=== White House Deputy Chief of Staff (2025–present) ===
On January 4, 2025, Trump named Harrison as the White House deputy chief of staff for operations. He was among several officials who observed the 2026 United States strikes in Venezuela from Mar-a-Lago.

== Personal life ==
In 2017, Harrison met Hayley D'Antuono. The two got engaged in November 2020 on the West Colonnade of the White House. In May 2022, he married D'Antuono at the Basilica of St. Mary in Alexandria, Virginia.

== Works cited ==
=== Articles ===
- Allen, Jonathan; Doyle, Katherine; Rubin, Lisa; Dilanian, Ken; Traylor, Jake; Schuppe, Jon (September 10, 2023). "Trump's post-presidential office is hiding in plain sight". NBC News.
- Cheney, Kyle; Wu, Nicholas (January 6, 2023). "Who repped who in the Jan. 6 probe: A look at the frequently used witness lawyers". Politico.
- Helderman, Rosalind; Lee, Michelle Ye Hee; Dawsey, Josh; Harris, Shane; Parker, Ashley; Barrett, Devlin (March 18, 2023). "The aide who stayed: Walt Nauta, key witness in Trump documents case". The Washington Post.
- Ewing, Giselle; Sutton, Chase (January 7, 2026). "Who was in Trump's Mar-a-Lago war room for Maduro's ouster". Politico.
- Feuer, Alan; Haberman, Maggie; Goldman, Adam; Vogel, Kenneth (September 8, 2022). "Trump's Post-Election Fund-Raising Comes Under Scrutiny by Justice Dept". The New York Times.
- Feuer, Alan; Savage, Charlie (December 1, 2022). "Appeals Court Scraps Special Master Review in Trump Documents Case". The New York Times.
- Kumar, Anita; McGraw, Meridith; Grunwald, Michael (January 20, 2021). "Donald Trump leaves as he arrived, minus his microphone". Politico.
- Lizza, Ryan; Bade, Rachael; Daniels, Eugene (May 23, 2022). "Biden's midterm window is closing". Politico.
- Palmer, Anna; Sherman, Jake (December 9, 2020). "'It's tight'". Politico.
- Perez, Evan; Orr, Gabby; Brown, Pamela (August 11, 2022). "Feds removed documents from Mar-a-Lago in June with grand jury subpoena". CNN.
- Timotija, Filip (January 4, 2025). "Trump announces additional senior White House officials". The Hill.

=== Documents ===
- "William Blalock Harrison in the Florida, U.S., Voter Registration Records, 1942-2023" (Document). Voter Registration Records.
- "President Donald J. Trump Announces Appointments for the Executive Office of the President" (Document). White House. February 2, 2019.
