= White House Deputy Chief of Staff =

US presidential political appointee

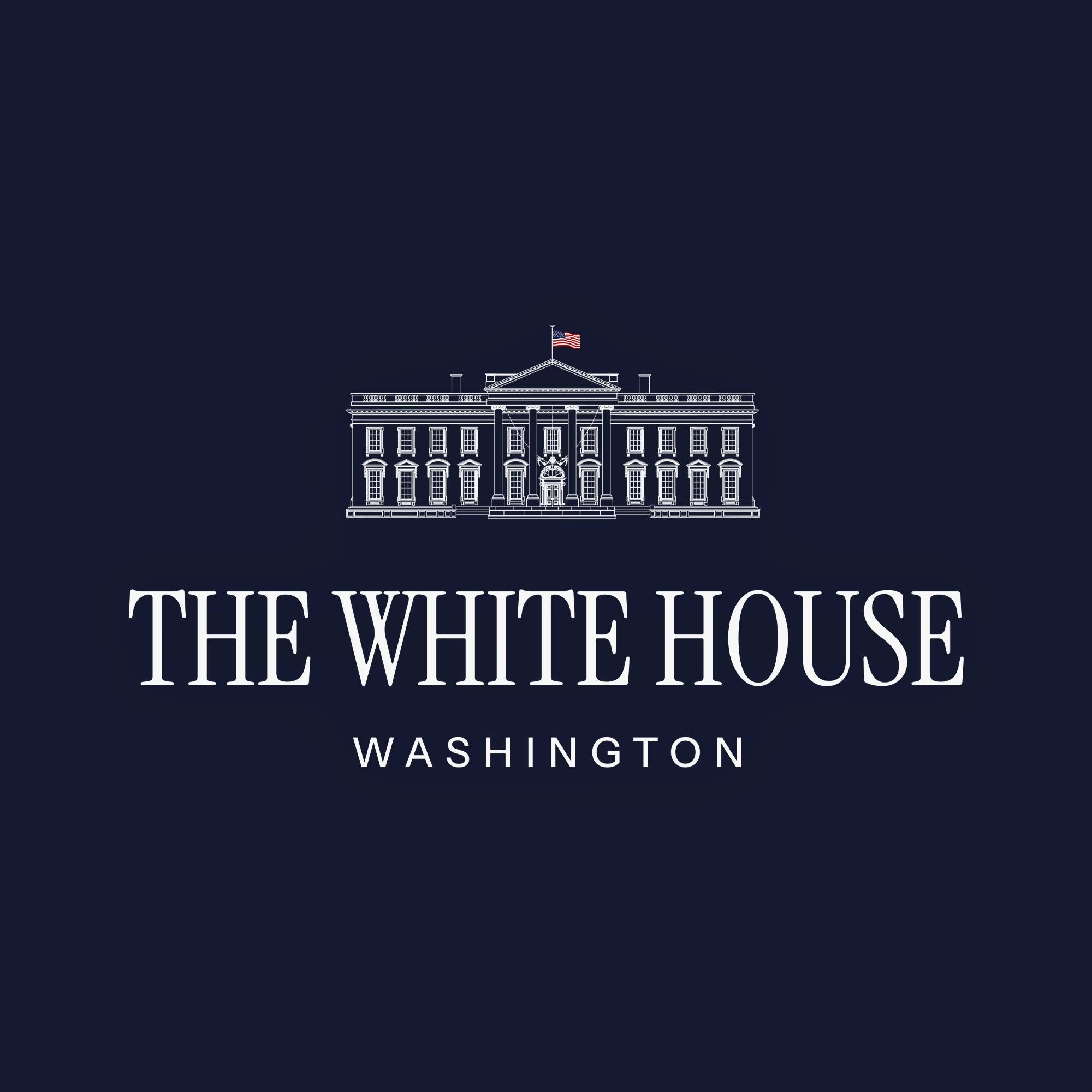
- Incumbent; Dan Scavino, Beau Harrison and Caleb Orr since January 20, 2025
- Executive Office of the President; White House Office
- Reports to: White House Chief of Staff
- Appointer: President of the United States
- Website: www.whitehouse.gov

The White House deputy chief of staff is officially the top aide to the White House chief of staff, who is the senior aide to the president of the United States. The deputy chief of staff usually has an office in the West Wing and is responsible for ensuring the smooth running of the White House bureaucracy, as well as such other duties as the chief of staff assigns to them. In all recent administrations, there have been multiple deputy chiefs with different duties.

== Current deputy chiefs of staff ==
In the second Trump administration, as of November 2026, there are three deputy chiefs of staff:

- Dan Scavino, deputy chief of staff
- Beau Harrison, deputy chief of staff for operations
- Caleb Orr, deputy chief of staff for policy

== List of past White House deputy chiefs of staff ==
=== Ford, Carter, Reagan & H.W. Bush administrations ===
- Ford administration
  - Dick Cheney, Deputy Chief of Staff, 1974-1975
- Carter administration
  - Landon Butler, Deputy Chief of Staff, 1977-1981
  - William G. Simpson, Deputy Chief of Staff, 1979-1981
- Reagan administration
  - Michael Deaver, Deputy Chief of Staff, 1981–1985
  - Kenneth Duberstein, Deputy Chief of Staff, 1987–1988
  - M. B. Oglesby Jr., Deputy Chief of Staff, 1988–1989
- George H. W. Bush administration
  - Andrew Card, Deputy Chief of Staff, 1989–1992
  - Henson Moore, Deputy Chief of Staff, 1992
  - Robert Zoellick, Deputy Chief of Staff, 1992–1993

=== Clinton administration ===
- Deputy Chief of Staff for Operations
  - Philip Lader, 1993–1994
  - Erskine Bowles, 1994–1996
  - Evelyn S. Lieberman, 1996
  - John Podesta, 1997–1998
  - Steve Ricchetti, 1998–2001
- Deputy Chief of Staff for Policy
  - Mark Gearan, 1993
  - Roy Neel, 1993
  - Harold M. Ickes, 1993–1997
  - Sylvia Mathews Burwell, 1997–1998
  - Maria Echaveste, 1998–2001

=== George W. Bush administration ===
- Deputy Chief of Staff for Operations
  - Joe Hagin, 2001–2008
  - Blake Gottesman, 2008–2009
- Deputy Chief of Staff for Policy
  - Joshua Bolten, 2001–2003
  - Harriet Miers, 2003–2005
  - Karl Rove, 2005–2007
  - Joel Kaplan, 2006–2009

=== Obama administration ===
- Deputy Chief of Staff for Operations
  - Jim Messina, 2009–2011
  - Alyssa Mastromonaco, 2011–2014
  - Anita Decker Breckenridge, 2014–2017
- Deputy Chief of Staff for Policy
  - Mona Sutphen, 2009–2011
  - Nancy-Ann DeParle, 2011–2013
  - Rob Nabors, 2013–2015
- Deputy Chief of Staff for Planning
  - Mark B. Childress, 2012–2014
- Deputy Chief of Staff for Policy Implementation
  - Kristie Canegallo, 2014–2017

=== First Trump administration (2017–2021) ===
- Principal Deputy Chief of Staff
  - Kirstjen Nielsen, 2017
  - Jim Carroll, 2017–2018
  - Zachary Fuentes, 2018–2019
  - Emma Doyle, 2019–2020
- Deputy Chief of Staff for Operations
  - Joe Hagin, 2017–2018
  - Dan Walsh, 2018–2019
  - Anthony M. Ornato, 2019–2021
- Deputy Chief of Staff for Policy
  - Rick Dearborn, 2017–2018
  - Chris Liddell, 2018–2021
- Deputy Chief of Staff for Implementation
  - Katie Walsh, 2017
- Deputy Chief of Staff for Communications
  - Bill Shine, 2018–2019
  - Dan Scavino, 2020–2021

=== Biden administration (2021–2025) ===
- Deputy Chief of Staff for Operations
  - Jen O'Malley Dillon, 2021–2024
  - Annie Tomasini, 2024–2025
- Deputy Chief of Staff for Policy
  - Bruce Reed, 2021–2025
- Deputy Chief of Staff for Implementation
  - Natalie Quillian, 2023–2025

=== Second Trump administration (2025–present) ===
- Deputy Chief of Staff
  - Dan Scavino, 2025–present
- Deputy Chief of Staff for Policy
  - Stephen Miller, 2025–2026
  - Caleb Orr, 2026-present
- Deputy Chief of Staff for Legislative, Political and Public Affairs
  - James Blair, 2025–2026
  - Richard Walters, 2026 (acting)
- Deputy Chief of Staff for Communications and Personnel
  - Taylor Budowich, 2025
- Deputy Chief of Staff for Strategic Implementation
  - Nick Luna, 2025–2026
- Deputy Chief of Staff for Operations
  - Beau Harrison, 2025–present

== In popular culture ==
- In the NBC television drama The West Wing, the position of White House deputy chief of staff (for strategic planning) was held by Josh Lyman in the fictional Bartlet administration and Sam Seaborn in the fictional Santos administration.
- Chad Lowe portrayed White House deputy chief of staff Reed Pollock, serving under White House chief of staff Tom Lennox and President Wayne Palmer on the television drama 24.
- Adan Canto portrayed the White House deputy chief of staff before being promoted to White House chief of staff in the ABC political drama series Designated Survivor.
- Kristen Connolly portrayed White House deputy chief of staff Christina Gallagher in House of Cards.
