= Joe Hagin =

American politician (born 1956)

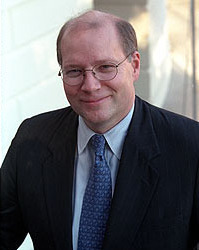
- Hagin in 2002

White House Deputy Chief of Staff for Operations
- In office January 20, 2017 – July 6, 2018
- President: Donald Trump
- Preceded by: Anita Decker Breckenridge
- Succeeded by: Daniel Walsh
- In office January 20, 2001 – July 20, 2008
- President: George W. Bush
- Preceded by: Steve Ricchetti
- Succeeded by: Blake Gottesman

Personal details
- Born: Joseph Whitehouse Hagin II; January 6, 1956 (age 70) Lexington, Kentucky, U.S.
- Party: Republican
- Education: Kenyon College (BA)

Joseph Whitehouse Hagin II (born January 6, 1956) is an American political aide who served as White House Deputy Chief of Staff for Operations under President Donald Trump from 2017 to 2018, a role he also served in for President George W. Bush from 2001 until July 2008. In September 2008, he was interim CEO of Jet Support Services Inc. Joe Hagin co-founded Command Consulting Group in April 2009.

== Early life ==
Hagin was born in Lexington, Kentucky and raised in the Village of Indian Hill near Cincinnati, Ohio. He received a Bachelor of Arts from Kenyon College in 1979 where he was a member of the Delta Kappa Epsilon fraternity.

== Career ==
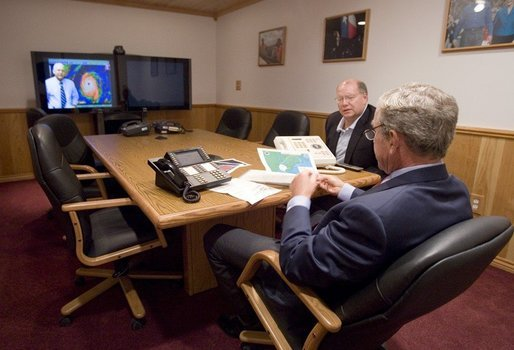
Hagin with President George W. Bush in 2005

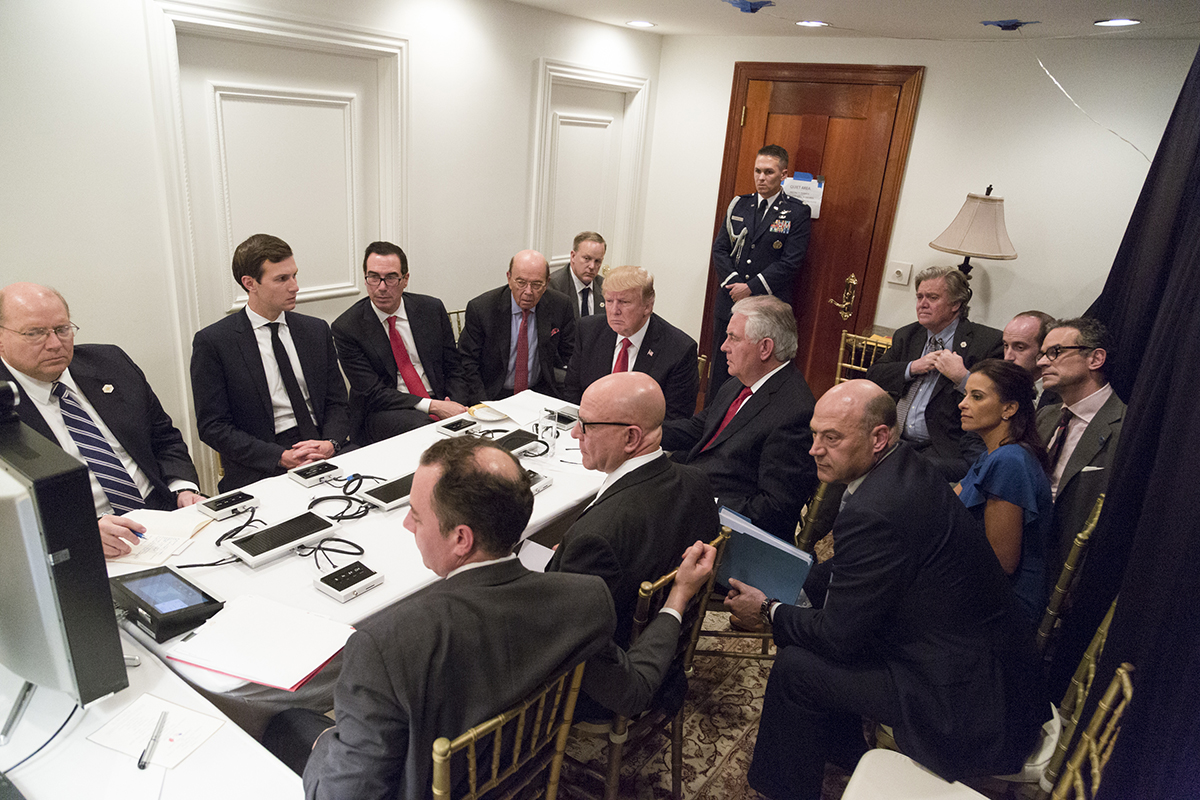
Hagin during the April 2017 Syrian missile strike operation

Hagin aided George H. W. Bush during his unsuccessful GOP presidential nomination campaign in 1979. When Bush became vice president in 1981, he selected Hagin as his personal aide. Bush also appointed him to head the Vice President's Legislative Affairs, 1983–85. In 1985, Hagin left the White House to be Public Affairs Director for Federated Department Stores, which owns Macy's and Bloomingdale's.

He returned to politics during the 1988 presidential campaign where he aided Bush in his successful run. He continued his service during the administration as Appointments Secretary to the President until he took a job as vice president of corporate affairs at Chiquita Brands International in 1991. Hagin also served as a volunteer firefighter for the Madeira Indian Hill Joint Fire District before moving to Washington D.C. and while working for Chiquita Brands International.

Hagin aided George W. Bush as a deputy campaign manager during the 2000 presidential campaign. He was appointed Deputy Chief of Staff in 2001 and remained in the position until July 2008. Prior to Karl Rove's resignation in 2007, Hagin's day-to-day power rivaled that of Rove.

In January 2017, President-Elect Donald Trump announced that Hagin would serve in as the White House Deputy Chief of Staff for Operations. Chief of Staff John F. Kelly announced on September 6, 2017, at a White House staff meeting, that Hagin will oversee the president's schedule.

Hagin left the White House in 2018; prior to his departure, he played a central role in planning the North Korea–United States summit in Singapore in June 2018.

In 2022, Hagin joined LG to manage government relations.

Political offices
| Preceded by Steve Ricchetti | White House Deputy Chief of Staff for Operations; 2001–2008 | Succeeded by Blake Gottesman |
| Preceded by Anita Decker Breckenridge | White House Deputy Chief of Staff for Operations; 2017–2018 | Succeeded by Daniel Walsh |
