= Jim Messina (political staffer) =

American political advisor

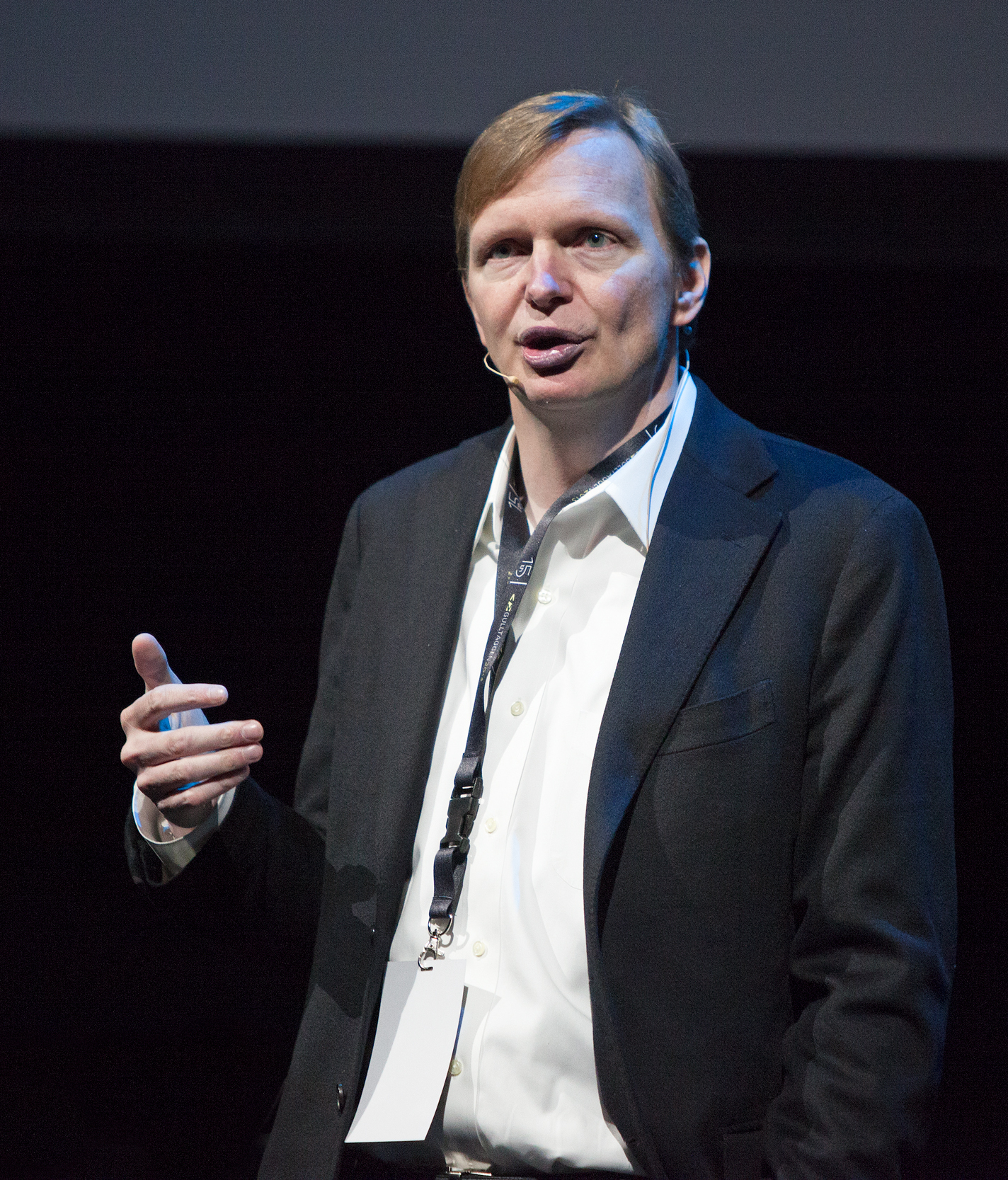

White House Deputy Chief of Staff for Operations
- In office January 20, 2009 – January 26, 2011
- President: Barack Obama
- Preceded by: Blake Gottesman
- Succeeded by: Alyssa Mastromonaco

Personal details
- Born: October 29, 1969 (age 57) Denver, Colorado, U.S.
- Party: Democratic
- Education: University of Montana (BA)

Jim Messina (born October 29, 1969) is an American political adviser who was the White House deputy chief of staff for operations under President Barack Obama from 2009 to 2011 and served as the campaign manager for Obama's successful 2012 re-election campaign. He is the CEO of The Messina Group (TMG).

Messina became President Obama's White House deputy chief of staff and earned the nickname "the fixer." Messina was integral to the passage on the Affordable Care Act and was widely credited with the effort to repeal "Don't Ask Don't Tell".

In January 2013, the Obama administration announced the launch of Organizing for Action, an advocacy organization that would promote President Obama's policies, with Jim Messina as national chair. That same year, Messina became co-chair of Priorities USA Action.

In various roles he has advised a number of international campaigns and candidates, including former UK prime minister David Cameron, Spanish prime minister Mariano Rajoy, Prime Minister of Italy Matteo Renzi, and UK prime minister Theresa May.

== Early life and education ==
Messina was born in Denver, Colorado, and raised in Boise, Idaho. He graduated from Boise High School in 1988 and earned his Bachelor of Arts degree in political science and journalism from the University of Montana in 1993. In 1993, as a college senior, Messina managed Dan Kemmis's successful re-election bid for mayor of Missoula, Montana.

== Career ==
=== Prior to 2008 ===
In 1995, Messina was hired by Democratic U.S. senator Max Baucus of Montana. In 2002, he ran Baucus's 2002 re-election campaign. Messina "refused to let Baucus attend any debate that didn't include a third-party candidate whose skin had turned blue from drinking an anti-infection solution", which was a distraction to help take attention away from the more credible Republican candidate. Messina was purportedly responsible for creating an ad for Baucus that observers considered homophobic.

In 2005, he re-united with Baucus and became his chief of staff. Messina was integral in devising the Democratic strategy that prevented the allowance of private accounts within Social Security. Messina was credited by The New York Times Magazine as the brains behind the defeat of President Bush's plan.

Messina has also been involved with other political campaigns from Alaska to New York, including serving as an advisor to Montana state senator Jon Tester's successful election in 2006. In 1999, he became chief of staff to Democratic U.S. congresswoman Carolyn McCarthy of New York. He then became chief of staff to U.S. senator Byron Dorgan of North Dakota, from 2002 to 2004. In 2004, he made $80,510 and in 2005 made $128,936.

=== Barack Obama presidential campaign, 2008 ===
Messina was hired as National Chief of Staff for the Obama campaign in the 2008 general election. He was credited with leading the efforts to staff up for the general election and controlled a $750 million budget.

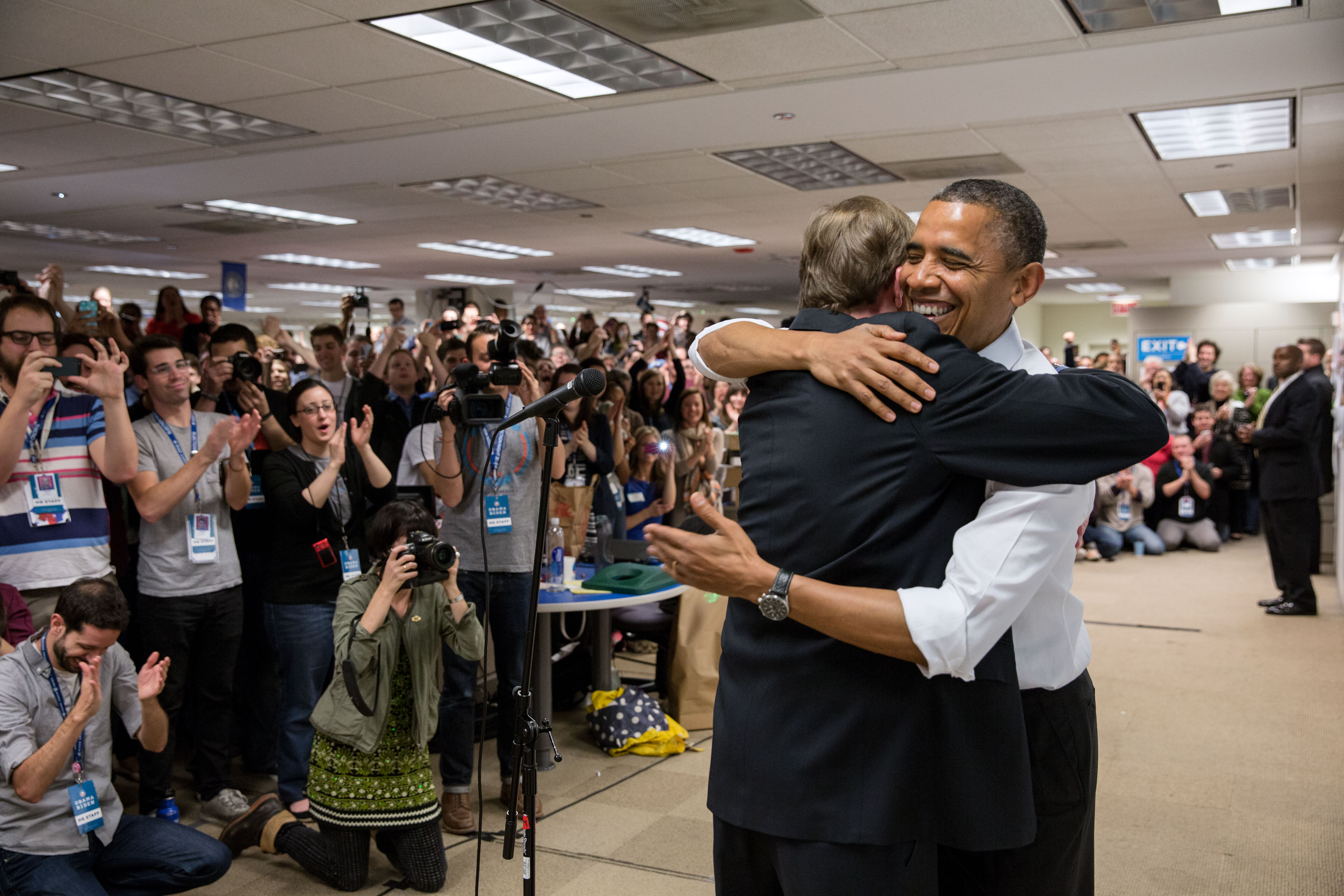
Messina celebrates Obama's reelection in November 2012.

After Obama won, Messina was named Director of Personnel for the Obama-Biden Transition team, helping Obama pick his cabinet.

=== Barack Obama presidential campaign, 2012 ===
Messina was Obama's campaign manager during the 2012 presidential election. In January 2011, Messina left his job at the White House and began "a rolling series of personal seminars with the CEOs and senior executives of companies that included Apple, Facebook, Zynga, Google, Microsoft, Salesforce, and DreamWorks". His goal, he said, was to learn everything he could about "organizational growth, emerging technologies, marketing", to better serve the President in his role as campaign manager during the 2012 re-election campaign.

For his work, the American Political Consultant's association named him the International Strategist of the Year.

=== After 2012 ===
In January 2013, Messina became head of Organizing for Action (OFA), using the Obama For America database and other resources to support President Obama's legislative agenda in his second term. While OFA was formed in 2009 by the President-elect, it was reformed as a political-action non-profit group in January, 2013.

He founded The Messina Group (TMG), a full-service consulting firm with offices in Washington, New York, San Francisco, and London.

In August 2013, Messina signed on as a consultant to the British Conservative Party, helping them successfully fend off a challenge from the Labour Party in 2015. "Whereas British pollsters consistently missed that the Tories were moving into pole position, Messina's internal numbers showed for weeks they were on course to be the largest party."

While some were surprised by Messina's move to work with the Tories, The Daily Telegraph pointed out that "this makes more sense when you consider that Mr Cameron's policies – such as support for gay marriage and confronting climate change – would probably make him a centrist Democrat in the United States." The combination of "data-driven ground game, relentless messaging and sophisticated social media is Mr Messina's signature", and as stated in The Daily Telegraph, is what Mr. Messina brought to the Cameron campaign, ultimately aiding in a stunning victory for the Conservatives. In a statement, Messina also added his personal admiration for Prime Minister David Cameron.

In January 2016, Messina was hired by Prime Minister of Italy Matteo Renzi as campaign's advisor for the constitutional referendum in December. The campaign was unsuccessful and Renzi was forced to resign as prime minister in its wake. Messina received 400,000 euros for his advice.

In June 2016, Messina began working with Spanish prime minister Mariano Rajoy, using data and targeted social media that ultimately helped Rajoy win a bigger than expected victory in that year's elections and take charge of a minority government in October of that year.

Messina worked with Prime Minister Theresa May as a campaign strategist for the 2017 United Kingdom general election. Theresa May and the Conservatives suffered a very underwhelming performance, in which she successfully remained prime minister, but failed to keep Conservatives in the majority. For May, the election has been called a "disastrous gamble".

Political offices
Preceded by Blake Gottesman	White House Deputy Chief of Staff for Operations; 2009–2011	Succeeded by Alyssa Mastromonaco
