= Caleb Orr =

American lawyer (born 1994)

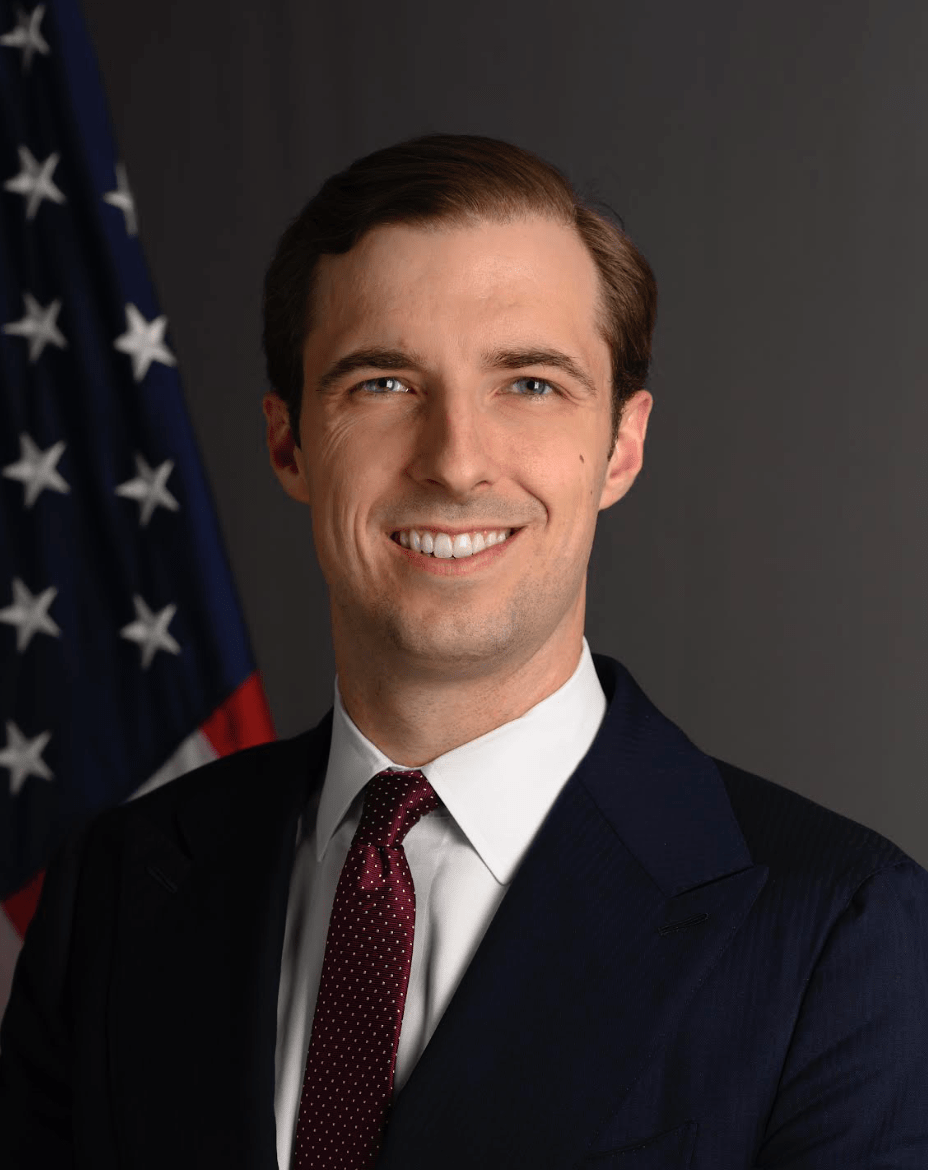
- Official portrait, 2025

White House Deputy Chief of Staff for Policy
- Incumbent
- Assumed office November 9, 2026
- President: Donald Trump
- Preceded by: Stephen Miller

White House Senior Policy Strategist
- In office August 31, 2026 – November 9, 2026
- President: Donald Trump
- Preceded by: Emily Underwood

Assistant Secretary of State for Economic and Business Affairs
- In office November 12, 2025 – August 31, 2026
- President: Donald Trump
- Preceded by: Ramin Toloui
- Succeeded by: Hugo Yue-Ho Yon (acting)

Personal details
- Born: Caleb William Orr; July 6, 1994 (age 32)
- Spouse: Gabby Morrongiello (m. 2018)
- Children: 2
- Education: Abilene Christian University (BA)

Caleb William Orr (born July 6, 1994) is an American lawyer who has served as the White House deputy chief of staff for policy since 2026. Orr served as the White House senior policy strategist from August 2026 to November 2026 and as the assistant secretary of state for economic and business affairs from 2025 to 2026.

Orr attended Abilene Christian University, majoring in political science. While at Abilene Christian, he was hired by Florida senator Marco Rubio. Orr served as a policy advisor to Rubio. In August 2022, Orr joined the lawyer C. Boyden Gray's firm, Boyden Gray & Associates. In February 2025, President Donald Trump nominated Orr to serve as the assistant secretary of state for economic and business affairs. In August 2026, Orr resigned as the assistant secretary of state to serve as the White House senior policy strategist. He became the White House deputy chief of staff for policy in November.

== Early life and education (1994–2012) ==
Caleb William Orr was born on July 6, 1994. Orr attended Abilene Christian University, where he majored in political science. He served as Abilene Christian's sophomore vice president.

== Career ==
=== Congressional work (2015–2022) ===
While a year away from graduating from Abilene Christian University, Orr was hired by Florida senator Marco Rubio. In January 2018, he was engaged to Gabby Morrongiello, a White House correspondent for the Washington Examiner; they were married in September and have two children. By July 2019, Orr had become a policy advisor to Rubio, and by the following year, he had become Rubio's projects director. He left Rubio's office by July 2022 as a senior policy advisor and as the deputy staff director of the Senate Committee on Small Business and Entrepreneurship when Rubio was its chair.

=== Boyden Gray (2022–2025) ===
In August 2022, Orr joined the lawyer C. Boyden Gray's firm, Boyden Gray & Associates, as a research fellow. He contributed to the Heritage Foundation's Mandate for Leadership for Project 2025.

== Assistant Secretary of State for Economic and Business Affairs (2025–2026) ==
On February 12, 2025, President Donald Trump nominated Orr to serve as the assistant secretary of state for economic and business affairs. The Senate Committee on Foreign Relations held a hearing for Orr on May 8, and the Senate voted on his nomination on November 5.

As the assistant secretary of state for economic and business affairs, Orr was involved in foreign energy deals. Patrick Brunings, Suriname's minister of oil, gas, and the environment, spoke to Orr about offering Suriname's gas to the United States in March 2026, following the Iran war. The following month, Orr signed a memorandum of understanding with Bolivia on critical minerals, including lithium. According to The Washington Post, he intervened to request a visa for the convicted businessman Alejandro Betancourt López from the United States embassy in London in June. Orr resigned as the assistant secretary of state for economic and business affairs after becoming the White House senior policy strategist in August.

== White House Deputy Chief of Staff for Policy (2026–present) ==
In August 2026, Orr became the White House senior policy strategist, succeeding Emily Underwood. After Stephen Miller became the White House chief of staff, he appointed Orr to succeed him as the White House deputy chief of staff for policy.
