= Reggie Love =

American personal aide, college athlete and media editor

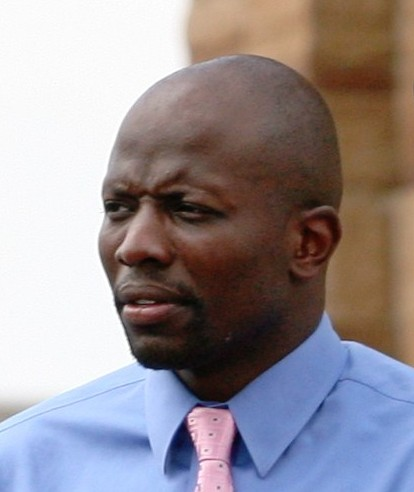

Personal Aide to the President
- In office January 20, 2009 – November 10, 2011
- President: Barack Obama
- Preceded by: Jared Weinstein
- Succeeded by: Brian Mosteller

Personal details
- Born: April 29, 1981 (age 45) Richmond, Virginia, U.S.
- Party: Democratic
- Education: Duke University (BA); University of Pennsylvania (MBA)
- Basketball career

Personal information
- Listed height: 6 ft 4 in (1.93 m)
- Listed weight: 225 lb (102 kg)

Career information
- High school: Providence Day (Charlotte, North Carolina)
- College: Duke (2000–2005)
- Position: Wide Receiver and Forward
- Number: 42, 30

Career highlights
- National champion (2001)

Reginald L. Love (born April 29, 1981) is an American media editor, former college football and basketball player, and former presidential personal aide. Love served as the special assistant and personal aide, commonly referred to as body man, to U.S. president Barack Obama from 2009 to 2011. In July 2015, Vice Media announced that Love would become an editor-at-large for its sports site, Vice Sports.

== Early life ==
Love attended high school at Providence Day School in Charlotte, North Carolina.

He graduated with a degree in political science and public policy from Duke University. While at Duke, he was a two-sport athlete, playing football and basketball. He played wide receiver for the Duke Blue Devils football team on a football scholarship.

Love also played forward for the Duke Blue Devils basketball team. He was a walk-on as a freshman, and later became team captain as a senior. He played on the 2001 team that won the NCAA national championship.

== Career ==
=== Obama administration ===
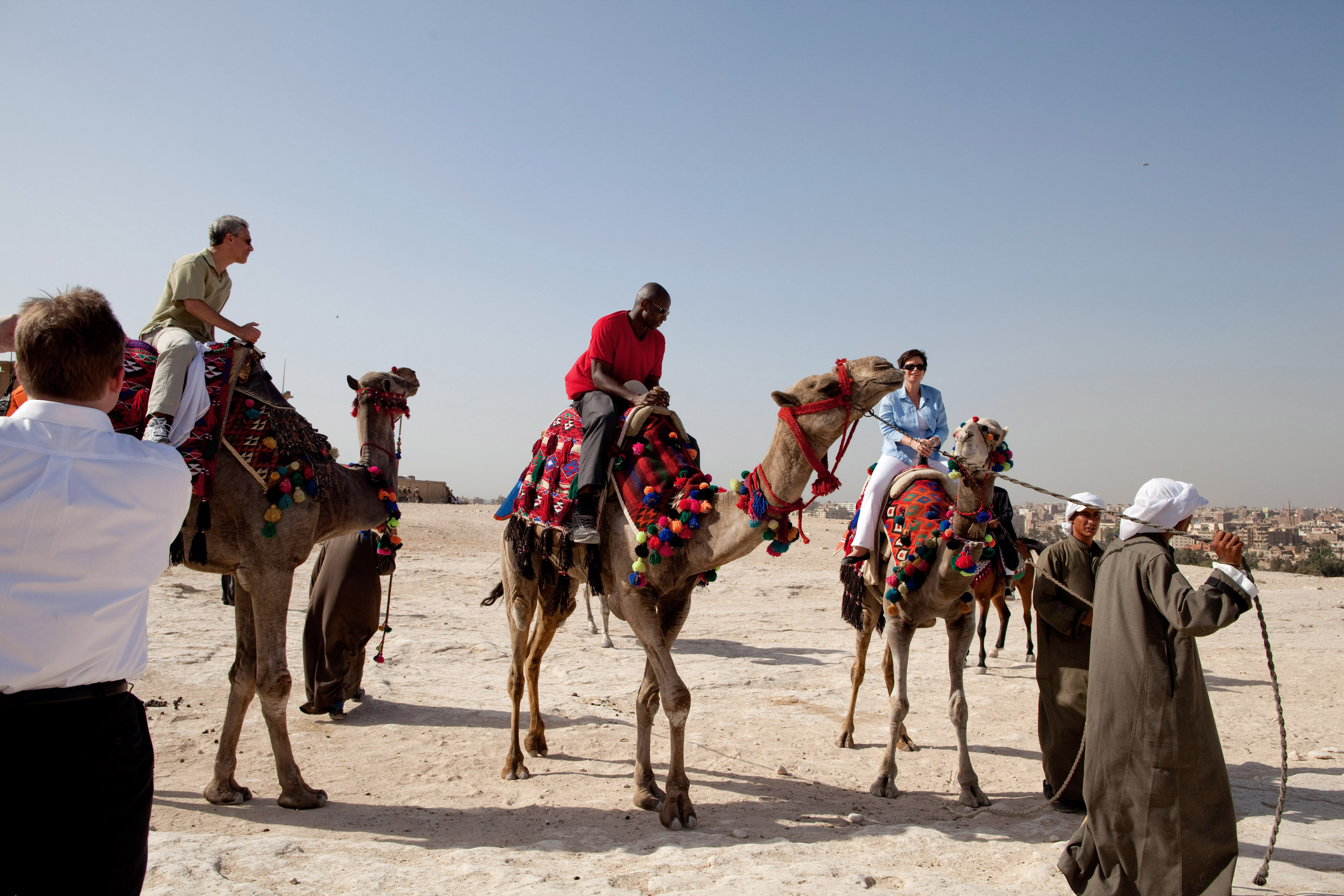
Love, Chief of Staff Rahm Emanuel, and Senior Advisor Valerie Jarrett take a ride on camels in Egypt on June 4, 2009.

Love applied for an internship on Capitol Hill in 2006. He was interviewed by Robert Gibbs, Obama's communications director, for a position in Obama's Senate office. He eventually rose to become deputy political director on Obama's Senate campaign side. He became Obama's personal assistant in 2007, during the 2008 presidential campaign.

As Obama's aide, his job was to anticipate any and all of Obama's needs. In reference to the myriad support duties Love performed, Obama referred to Love as his "iReggie", a play on Apple's iPad, humorously stating that "I have an iReggie, who has my books, my newspapers, my music all in one place". Love and Obama played basketball every day there was a primary during the 2008 presidential election, and they played regularly in the following years, always on the same side. Love and Obama's friends organized a game of basketball on the White House basketball court to celebrate Obama's 50th birthday. The game featured the NBA players Shane Battier, LeBron James, Magic Johnson, Maya Moore, Alonzo Mourning, Joakim Noah, Chris Paul and Derrick Rose in addition to Obama's friends from high school. Kobe Bryant and Bill Russell were spectators. Obama has described Love as his "little brother."

=== Post-White House ===
Love left the White House Office to complete his MBA at Wharton School of the University of Pennsylvania in 2012. After graduation, he became a partner and vice president for RON Transatlantic Holdings.

Love authored a memoir, titled Power Forward: My Presidential Education, about his time working for President Obama. The book was released in February 2015.

In July 2015, Love became an editor-at-large for Vice Sports, in addition to his role at Vice Media.

In 2019, Love endorsed Pete Buttigieg in the 2020 Democratic Party presidential primaries.
