= Jared Weinstein =

American government official (born 1979)

Personal Aide to the President
- In office June 14, 2006 – January 20, 2009
- President: George W. Bush
- Preceded by: Blake Gottesman
- Succeeded by: Reggie Love

Personal details
- Born: September 4, 1979 (age 47) Birmingham, Alabama
- Party: Republican
- Education: Duke University; Stanford University

Jared Weinstein is a former government official. He served as the special assistant and personal aide to U.S. President George W. Bush from 2006 to 2009.

Prior to this post, he served as an aide to White House Chiefs of Staff Andy Card and Josh Bolten. After President Bush left office, Weinstein served as Deputy Chief of Staff in the Office of George W. Bush in Dallas, Texas.

In 2011, Weinstein joined Palantir Technologies in a business development and advisory role and also co-founded venture capital firm Thrive Capital as a general partner and where he serves as COO. Weinstein stepped down from his role at Palantir in 2015.

== Biography ==
Born in Birmingham, Alabama, he is the son of Brenda and Steve Weinstein, members of Birmingham's Jewish community. Weinstein attended Mountain Brook High School.

Weinstein graduated from Duke University with a BA in Public Policy in 2002, where he received a grant to help fund the Durham, North Carolina inner-city baseball league.

In 2011 he graduated with an MBA from the Stanford Graduate School of Business.
