= Annie Tomasini =

American political operative

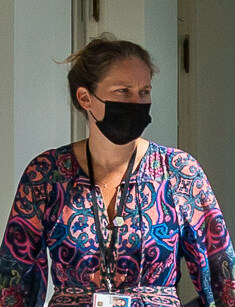
- Tomasini in 2021

White House Deputy Chief of Staff
- In office February 9, 2024 – January 20, 2025; Served with Bruce Reed, Natalie Quillian
- President: Joe Biden
- Chief of Staff: Jeff Zients
- Preceded by: Jen O'Malley Dillon
- Succeeded by: Dan Scavino; Beau Harrison

Senior Advisor to the President
- In office June 2023 – January 20, 2025
- President: Joe Biden
- Preceded by: Neera Tanden
- Succeeded by: Massad Boulos; Elon Musk

Director of Oval Office Operations
- In office January 20, 2021 – February 9, 2024
- President: Joe Biden
- Deputy: Ashley Williams
- Preceded by: Nick Luna
- Succeeded by: Richard Ruffner

Personal details
- Born: 1980 (age 45–46) Boston, Massachusetts, U.S.
- Party: Democratic
- Education: Boston University (BA)

Annie Tomasini (born 1980) is an American political operative who served as a senior advisor and deputy chief of staff for President Joe Biden during his administration. A longtime aide to Biden, she became a senior advisor in June 2023 and added deputy chief of staff duties in February 2024, serving in both roles until January 2025.

== Early life and education ==
Tomasini is a 1998 graduate of the Boston Latin School. She graduated from Boston University in 2002, where she was the captain of the women's basketball team.

== Career ==
Tomasini began her political career serving as press secretary for then-Senator Biden when he chaired the Senate Foreign Relations Committee.

Tomasini left the vice president's office in 2011 to join Harvard University on the public affairs team, but returned to serve again in 2019.

She played a pivotal role in Biden's 2020 presidential campaign as his Travelling Chief of Staff. Upon Biden assuming office as President, Tomasini joined his Executive Office staff; in 2023, she held the title of assistant to the president and senior adviser to the president and director of Oval Office operations. She was named deputy chief of staff in February 2024, replacing Jen O'Malley Dillon, who left to join Biden's reelection campaign.

At the end of the Biden presidency, Tomasini was designated by Biden to raise funds for the Joseph R. Biden Presidential Library.

Political offices
Preceded by Jen O'Malley Dillon	White House Deputy Chief of Staff; 2024–2025	Succeeded by Dan Scavino; Beau Harrison
