= Blake Gottesman =

American civil servant

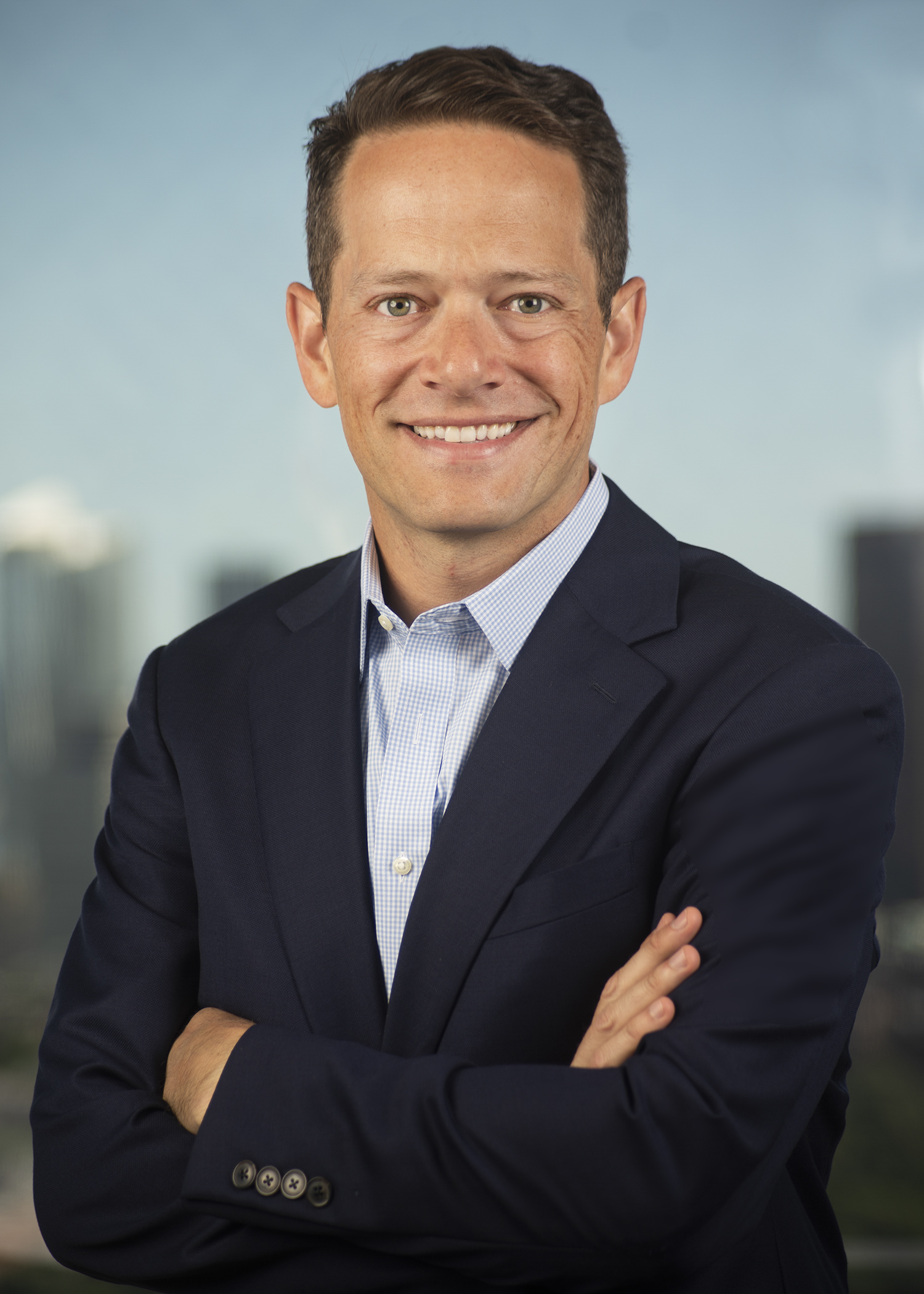

White House Deputy Chief of Staff for Operations
- In office July 20, 2008 – January 20, 2009
- President: George W. Bush
- Preceded by: Joe Hagin
- Succeeded by: Jim Messina

Personal Aide to the President
- In office February 2002 – June 14, 2006
- President: George W. Bush
- Preceded by: Logan Walters
- Succeeded by: Jared Weinstein

Personal details
- Born: Blake Lanier Gottesman Travis County, Texas, U.S.
- Party: Republican
- Education: Claremont McKenna College; Harvard University (MBA)

Blake Lanier Gottesman served as White House Deputy Chief of Staff to former U.S. President George W. Bush, becoming, at age 28, the youngest member of the Bush senior staff. He previously served in the Bush administration as personal aide and body man for the president from 2001 until 2006. His work for Bush began during Bush's presidential campaign in 1999.

== Early life ==
Gottesman was born in Travis County, Texas, the son of Lisa Babette (née Temerlin) and Sanford Lee Gottesman. His father is president of The Gottesman Company, a real estate development company based in Austin, Texas, and board member of the Overseas Private Investment Corporation. His maternal grandfather, Julius Liener Temerlin, was a prominent advertiser who founded the Dallas International Film Festival. He was raised Jewish.

Gottesman was educated at St. Andrews Episcopal School and Stephen F. Austin High School, both in Austin, Texas; during this time he dated Jenna Bush when her father was Governor of Texas. Gottesman attended Claremont McKenna College for one year and dropped out.

== Career ==
Gottesman worked as a junior aide to then-White House Chief of Staff Andrew Card at the beginning of Bush's first presidential term and became Bush's full-time personal aide in February 2002. Gottesman was responsible for managing Bush's day-to-day activities and traveled with him to functions and on overseas trips. In a 2006 Time article on Gottesman, he was said to understand Bush's moods and tendencies better than most of his other advisors, leading many to have discussions with him on issues before presenting them to the President. When compared to fictional presidential aide Charlie Young in television series The West Wing, Gottesman stated, "Our jobs are probably pretty similar."

After his stint as an aide, he enrolled in Harvard Business School, graduating in 2008. His admission to the school despite not having received an undergraduate degree was criticized by many media commentators.

After the inauguration of President Barack Obama, Gottesman joined Berkshire Partners, a Boston-based private equity firm, as a senior associate. Since then, Gottesman has been elevated to managing director at Berkshire.
