= Daniel Walsh (staffer) =

American former government official

Daniel Walsh is a former White House Deputy Chief of Staff for Operations.

== Career ==
Walsh served in the U.S. Coast Guard for 24 years.

Walsh served in government for more than 20 years before accepting the position of Deputy Chief of Staff for Operations. Prior to serving as Deputy Chief of Staff, Walsh led the White House Military Office.

Walsh was one of the staffers responsible for organizing the controversial July 4 "Celebration of America" in Washington, DC, which was criticized for its cost to taxpayers and the politicization of a federal holiday. The cost of the event was reported to be more than $13 million. Walsh was also involved in the scheme to host a G7 summit at one of President Trump's resorts, leading to backlash related to the emoluments clause.

Walsh announced in November 2019 that he would leave the White House. His departure added to the trend of high turnover in the Trump administration. Walsh's role in hiring his replacement, Anthony Ornato, was reportedly shared with Lindsay Reynolds, then Melania Trump's chief of staff.

In 2020, Walsh joined the defense contracting firm CACI.
