= Jeff Zients =

White House Chief of Staff from 2023 to 2025

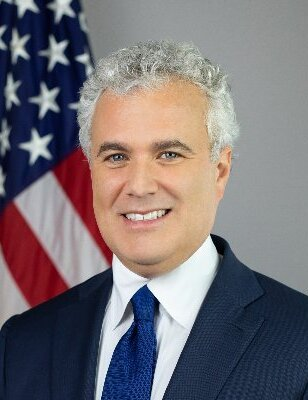
- Official portrait, 2023

31st White House Chief of Staff
- In office February 8, 2023 – January 20, 2025
- President: Joe Biden
- Deputy: Jen O'Malley Dillon; Bruce Reed; Natalie Quillian; Annie Tomasini
- Preceded by: Ron Klain
- Succeeded by: Susie Wiles

Counselor to the President
- In office January 20, 2021 – April 5, 2022 Serving with Steve Ricchetti
- President: Joe Biden
- Preceded by: Hope Hicks; Derek Lyons

White House Coronavirus Response Coordinator
- In office January 20, 2021 – April 5, 2022
- President: Joe Biden
- Deputy: Natalie Quillian
- Preceded by: Deborah Birx
- Succeeded by: Ashish Jha

10th Director of the National Economic Council
- In office March 5, 2014 – January 20, 2017
- President: Barack Obama
- Preceded by: Gene Sperling
- Succeeded by: Gary Cohn

Director of the Office of Management and Budget
- Acting
- In office January 27, 2012 – April 24, 2013
- President: Barack Obama
- Deputy: Heather Higginbottom
- Preceded by: Jack Lew
- Succeeded by: Sylvia Mathews Burwell
- In office July 30, 2010 – November 18, 2010
- President: Barack Obama
- Deputy: Jeffrey Liebman
- Preceded by: Peter R. Orszag
- Succeeded by: Jack Lew

1st Chief Performance Officer of the United States
- In office June 19, 2009 – October 16, 2013
- President: Barack Obama
- Preceded by: Position established
- Succeeded by: Beth Cobert

Deputy Director of the Office of Management and Budget for Management
- In office June 19, 2009 – October 16, 2013
- President: Barack Obama
- Preceded by: Clay Johnson III
- Succeeded by: Beth Cobert

Personal details
- Born: Jeffrey Dunston Zients; November 12, 1966 (age 60) Washington, D.C., U.S.
- Party: Democratic
- Spouse: Mary Menell
- Education: Duke University (BA)

Jeffrey Dunston Zients (/ˈzaɪənts/; born November 12, 1966) is an American business executive and former government official who served as the 31st White House chief of staff from February 2023 to January 2025 under President Joe Biden. Earlier in the Biden administration, he served as counselor to the president and White House coronavirus response coordinator from January 2021 to April 2022.

During the presidency of Barack Obama, Zients served as director of the National Economic Council from February 2014 to January 2017, served as acting director of the Office of Management and Budget in 2010 and from 2012 to 2013, and led the emergency effort to fix healthcare.gov after the troubled launch of that critical component of the Affordable Care Act.

Before entering government, Zients was an executive at firms including the Advisory Board Company and CEB. Zients joined the Biden administration after taking leave from his position as chief executive officer of Cranemere, an investment firm. He was a member of Facebook's board of directors from 2018 to 2020.

== Early life and education ==
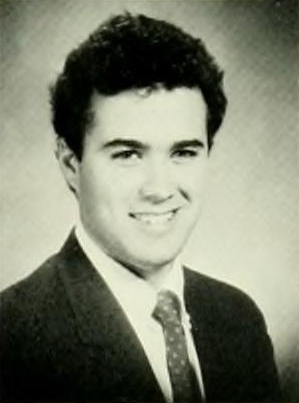
Zients in the Duke University yearbook, 1988

Zients was born in Washington, D.C., and raised in Kensington, Maryland. His family is Jewish. Zients graduated from the St. Albans School in 1984 and earned a bachelor's degree in political science from Duke University, graduating summa cum laude in 1988.

== Early business career ==
After college, Zients worked in management consulting for Mercer Management Consulting (now Oliver Wyman) and Bain & Company. As a consultant, Zients reportedly enjoyed the "culture, teamwork ... and analytical rigor". After management consulting, he was appointed the chief operating officer of DGB Enterprises, a holding company for the Advisory Board Company, Corporate Executive Board, and Atlantic Media Company.

At age 35, Zients was named to Fortune Magazine's "40 under 40", with an estimated wealth of $149 million.

=== Advisory board and corporate executive board ===
Zients was the chief operating officer (1996–1998), chief executive officer (1998–2000), and chairman (2001–2004) of the Advisory Board Company and former chairman (2000–2001) of the Corporate Executive Board. Zients and David G. Bradley took each of the companies public through initial public offerings that made both men multimillionaires.

=== Portfolio Logic ===
Zients founded and was the managing partner of Portfolio Logic LLC, an investment firm primarily focused on health care and business services. He was a member of the board of directors of XM Satellite Radio until its 2008 merger, and a board member at Sirius XM Radio until his Senate confirmation. Zients also sat on the boards of Revolution Health Group and Timbuk2 Designs.

=== Baseball ===
In 2005, Zients formed a group with Colin Powell and Fred Malek, among others, to compete for the purchase of the Washington Nationals. The group planned for Malek to be the managing partner for the first three years, after which Zients would take over. The group was unsuccessful; the team was purchased by a group led by Ted Lerner.

== Obama administration ==
=== Office of Management and Budget ===
In 2009, President Barack Obama appointed Zients to the new position of United States chief performance officer and deputy director for management (DDM) of the Office of Management and Budget. It was Zients's first governmental experience.

According to Obama, his assignment was to help "streamline processes, cut costs, and find best practices throughout" the U.S. government. His nomination was approved by the Senate in June 2009. As DDM, Zients established and chaired the President's Management Council.

Zients was the acting director of OMB from July 2010 to November 2010, and again from January 2012 to April 2013.

=== Healthcare.gov ===
Following the error-plagued launch of healthcare.gov on October 1, 2013, Obama and White House chief of staff Denis McDonough asked Zients to take charge of fixing the website. While leading the "tech surge" to do that, Zients also had an ownership position in PSA Healthcare. The position of the White House was that Zients's stake in PSA Healthcare, a pediatric home health business, was not a conflict of interest.

=== National Economic Council ===
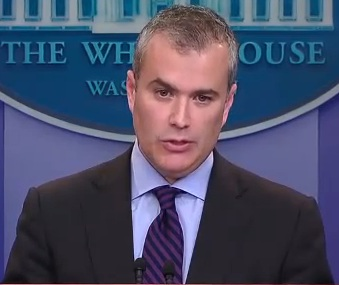
Zients speaking at White House press briefing on a possible government shutdown, 2011

From 2014 to 2017, Zients was an assistant to the president for economic policy and director of the National Economic Council (NEC). Zients also chaired the President's Management Advisory Board. The Wall Street Journal called Zients "a kind of ambassador to the business community", and lobbying groups such as the Business Roundtable and the U.S. Chamber of Commerce praised Zients as someone who heard them out.

At the NEC, Zients worked with the Department of Labor to finalize the fiduciary rule, also known as the conflict of interest rule. It required financial advisers to provide advice in their clients' best interest. The rule was strongly criticized by Wall Street leaders and business groups and was struck down by a federal appeals court in 2018.

In 2015, while NEC director, Zients described the Trans-Pacific Partnership as "a massive tax cut for American businesses".

== Return to the private sector ==
=== Facebook ===
Zients joined Facebook's board of directors in 2018, following the Cambridge Analytica scandal. While on Facebook's board, Zients chaired the Audit and Risk Oversight Committee. According to Facebook, he declined to seek re-election in 2020 "to devote more time to his business and other professional interests". Zients was paid $100,000 in cash and roughly $300,000 in stock in exchange for his work on Facebook's audit committee. As of December 2020, Zients had reportedly sold all of his holdings of Facebook stock. In December 2024, Facebook shareholders sought sanctions against Zients in relation to the Cambridge Analytica scandal. He was accused of deleting emails from his personal account that were relevant to the 2018 shareholder lawsuit, in violation of a litigation hold. The following month, vice chancellor of Delaware Chancery Court denied sanctions against Zients stating that Zients' messages were "less pertinent" having joined the board after the Cambridge Analytica scandal.

=== Cranemere ===
Zients was the CEO of the Wall Street investment firm Cranemere, an investment firm owned by Vincent Mai, for which he earned a combined salary and bonus of $1.6 million. As of December 2020, Zients was on leave from his position as chief executive officer of Cranemere.

In addition, Zients was an investor in the D.C.-based bagel deli startup Call Your Mother.

== Biden administration ==
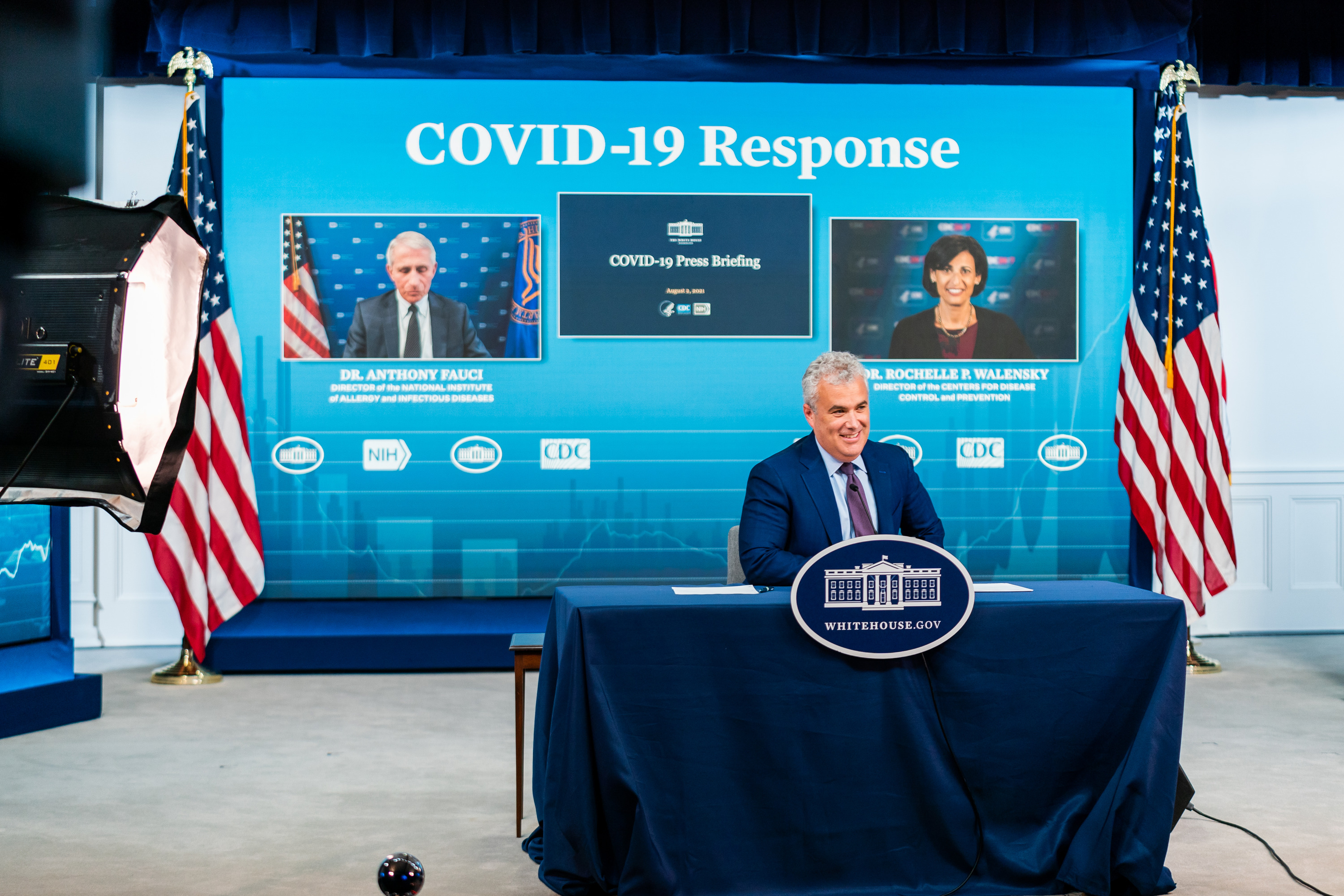
Zients at a press briefing with Anthony Fauci and Rochelle Walensky in August 2021

In summer 2020, Politico reported that Saguaro Strategies, a media and consulting firm, heavily edited Zients's Wikipedia article as he became more prominent in the Joe Biden 2020 presidential campaign. For example, Zients had advocated for the Trans-Pacific Partnership, which faced left-wing opposition. Still, the edit gave Zients's argument that it was "the most progressive trade agreement there's ever been." It eliminated an Obama official's comment that he thought Zients was a Republican.

As of October 2020, Zients was co-chair of the presidential transition of Joe Biden. He was described as "an important power center in the Biden transition team" and noted as a candidate for several positions in the incoming administration. On December 7, 2020, the Biden transition announced Zients's presumptive appointment as coordinator of the COVID-19 response and counselor to the president. The absence of any comprehensive COVID-19 vaccine distribution plan at the time of the handover from the outgoing Trump administration became an urgent priority for Zients after the inauguration on January 20, 2021.

In July 2021, Zients came under criticism for delaying the relaxation of travel restrictions between the US and Europe.

In March 2022, Zients announced he would be leaving the Biden administration in April, to be succeeded as Coronavirus Response Coordinator by Ashish Jha.

Zients was mentioned in an antisemitic flyer that originated in Australia in July 2022. The conspiracy theory posited that he and other Jewish people are part of a cabal responsible for COVID and a "COVID agenda".

On January 22, 2023, it was reported that Zients would replace Ron Klain as the White House chief of staff in February. On February 8, 2023, following President Joe Biden's State of the Union Address the previous night, Zients took office to become the 31st White House chief of staff.

Political offices
Preceded by Peter Orszag	Director of the Office of Management and Budget; Acting; 2010	Succeeded by Jack Lew
Preceded by Jack Lew	Director of the Office of Management and Budget; Acting; 2012–2013	Succeeded by Sylvia Mathews Burwell
Preceded by Gene Sperling	Director of the National Economic Council; 2014–2017	Succeeded by Gary Cohn
Preceded by Deborah Birx	White House Coronavirus Response Coordinator; 2021–2022	Succeeded by Ashish Jha
Preceded by Ron Klain	White House Chief of Staff; 2023–2025	Succeeded by Susie Wiles
