= Thomas McMahon =

Thomas McMahon may refer to:

- Thomas McMahon (Irish republican) (born 1948), IRA member
- Thomas McMahon (bishop) (1936–2025), Roman Catholic bishop of Brentwood
- Thomas A. McMahon (1943–1999), novelist and professor of applied mechanics and biology at Harvard University
- Thomas John McMahon (1864–1933), Australian photojournalist
- Thomas J. McMahon (1948–1969), American soldier and Medal of Honor recipient
- Sir Thomas McMahon, 2nd Baronet (1779–1860), commander-in-chief of Bombay, 1840–1847
- Sir Thomas Westropp McMahon, 3rd Baronet (1813–1892), British Army officer
- Tom McMahon (Democratic operative), executive director of the Democratic National Committee
- Tom McMahon (mayor), American politician and former mayor of Reading, Pennsylvania
- Tom McMahon (footballer, born 1907) (1907–1975), Australian footballer for South Melbourne and Melbourne
- Tom McMahon (footballer, born 1918) (1918–2005), Australian footballer for Footscray
- Tom McMahon (American football) (born 1969), American football coach
- Tom McMahon Sr. (1883–1943), Australian rugby league referee and coach
- Tom McMahon Jr. (1906/1907–1969), Australian rugby league referee and coach
