= Vicinity =

Vicinity may refer to:

- Vicinity Energy, American provider of district energy
- Vicinity Motor Corp., a bus manufacturer in Canada
- Vicinity card aka NFC-V, a wireless card following ISO/IEC 15693
