= Jen O'Malley Dillon =

American political strategist (born 1976)

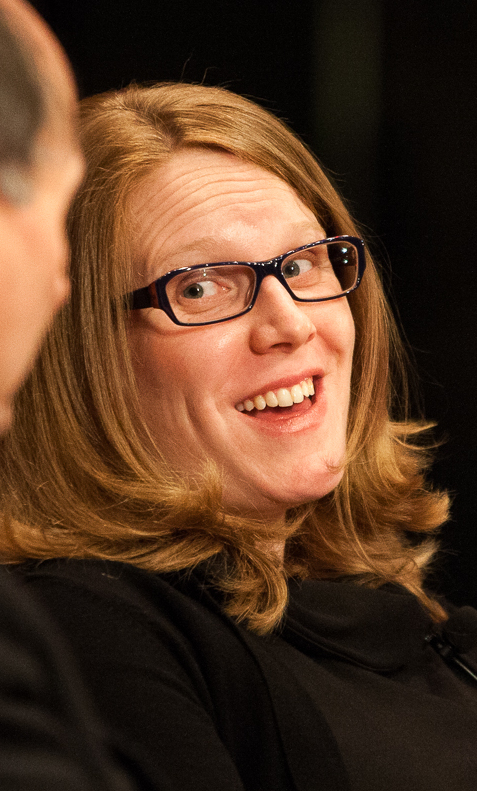
- O'Malley Dillon in 2012

White House Deputy Chief of Staff
- In office January 20, 2021 – February 8, 2024 Serving with Bruce Reed and Natalie Quillian
- President: Joe Biden
- Chief of Staff: Ron Klain (2021–2023); Jeff Zients (2023–2024)
- Preceded by: Anthony Ornato
- Succeeded by: Annie Tomasini

Executive Director of the Democratic National Committee
- In office January 2009 – February 2011
- Chair: Tim Kaine
- Preceded by: Tom McMahon
- Succeeded by: Patrick Gaspard

Personal details
- Born: Jennifer Brigid O'Malley; September 28, 1976 (age 50) Boston, Massachusetts, U.S.
- Party: Democratic
- Spouse: Patrick Dillon (m. 2007)
- Children: 3
- Relatives: Matt O'Malley (second cousin)
- Education: Tufts University (BA)
- Occupation: Political strategist

Jennifer Brigid O'Malley Dillon (née O'Malley; born September 28, 1976), also known as JOD, is an American political consultant and former strategist who served as White House deputy chief of staff from 2021 to 2024 under President Joe Biden. She was executive director of the Democratic National Committee from 2009 to 2011.

O'Malley Dillon served as associate director of personnel during Barack Obama's presidential transition between 2008 and 2009; she went on to co-found Precision Strategies, a political consulting firm, in 2013. In the 2020 Democratic primaries, O'Malley Dillon chaired Beto O'Rourke's presidential campaign before joining Biden's staff as campaign manager, making her the first female campaign manager for a successful Democratic presidential ticket. She later chaired Biden's 2024 re-election campaign before assuming the same role for Kamala Harris.

== Early life and education ==
Jennifer Brigid O'Malley was born on September 28, 1976, in Jamaica Plain, Boston. Her parents, Kevin and Kathleen, raised O'Malley and her three siblings in Franklin, Massachusetts.

A graduate of Franklin High School, O'Malley later attended Tufts University, graduating with a Bachelor of Arts majoring in political science in 1998. At Tufts, O'Malley was captain of the softball team.

== Early career ==
O'Malley Dillon's first job in politics was answering phones for Massachusetts attorney general Scott Harshbarger in his 1998 re-election campaign, though she volunteered for Bill Clinton's re-election campaign in New Hampshire in 1996. In 1999, she joined Al Gore's 2000 presidential campaign as a field organizer; she was promoted to regional field director by the end of the campaign. She worked as a field director for the campaigns of U.S. senators Tim Johnson and Mary Landrieu before joining John Edwards's 2004 presidential campaign as the Iowa field director in 1993. After Edwards suspended his campaign, she became deputy campaign manager for U.S. senator Tom Daschle's re-election campaign.

In 2007, O'Malley Dillon joined Edwards's 2008 presidential campaign as the Iowa state director, later becoming Edwards's deputy campaign manager. After Barack Obama won the primary, she joined his campaign staff as the battleground states director. Obama, who went on to win the general election, appointed O'Malley Dillon to be associate director of personnel during his presidential transition. She later served as the executive director of the Democratic National Committee under Tim Kaine.

In early 2011, O'Malley Dillon resigned as executive director to join Obama's 2012 re-election campaign as deputy campaign manager, contributing to Project Narwhal.

After Obama was re-elected, O'Malley Dillon co-founded the political consulting firm Precision Strategies with fellow Obama campaign alumni Stephanie Cutter and Teddy Goff; the trio consulted for the Liberal Party of Canada during the 2015 Canadian federal election. Through Precision Strategies, O'Malley Dillon also advised Gates Ventures, a venture capital firm founded by Bill Gates; the Chan Zuckerberg Initiative, founded by Mark Zuckerberg and his wife, Priscilla Chan; General Electric; and Lyft; her deferred compensation and severance from Precision was at least $420,000.

After the 2016 presidential election, O'Malley Dillon chaired the Democratic National Committee's Unity Reform Commission. In 2019, she was involved in an effort by Democratic Party data and political personnel to create a data exchange to allow for greater information sharing between Democratic campaigns.

In 2019, O'Malley Dillon became manager of Beto O'Rourke's 2020 presidential campaign, moving to El Paso, Texas, for the job. The New York Times reported that O'Malley Dillon clashed with O'Rourke over his clothing choices and manner of speech.

== Biden administration and presidential campaigns ==
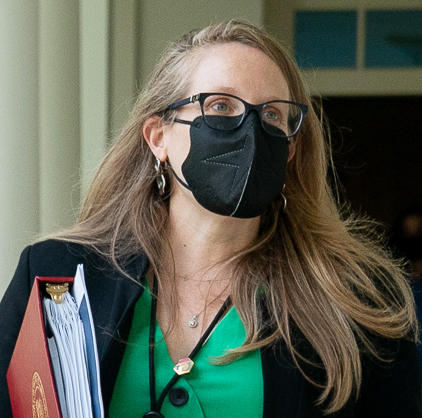
O'Malley Dillon in 2021

In April 2020, O'Malley Dillon, often referred to by her initials – JOD, was announced as the new manager for Biden's 2020 presidential campaign. During the announcement, Biden stated that O'Malley Dillon "played a key role in every Democratic presidential victory over the past two decades".

After Biden's victory, O'Malley Dillon was named White House deputy chief of staff. On February 8, 2024, O'Malley Dillon left the Biden administration to chair the president's 2024 re-election campaign.

O'Malley Dillon was described by Politico as a Biden loyalist and a member of the president's inner circle. She defended Biden's performance in the June 27 presidential debate with Donald Trump, telling members of the campaign's National Finance Committee that Biden was "probably in better health than most of us". Before Biden's withdrawal from the 2024 presidential election, O'Malley Dillon was described as "the central figure keeping the Biden campaign on track".

== Kamala Harris presidential campaign ==
After Biden announced his withdrawal, O'Malley Dillon was named chair of Kamala Harris's presidential campaign. She oversaw campaign finances and played a key role in most major decisions, with the campaign spending around $1.5 billion over 15 weeks. O'Malley Dillon's campaign style highlighted Harris's background as a prosecutor and her support for abortion rights. Describing Harris as the underdog in the race, she sought to market the vice president to undecided voters and those who had supported Robert F. Kennedy Jr.'s presidential campaign.

=== Criticism ===
O'Malley Dillon was criticized by some of Harris's staffers for her performance during the campaign. NBC News reported that campaign staffers and supporters viewed O'Malley Dillon as an autocrat who "siloed off information with just a tight circle of advisers" and remained loyal to Biden over Harris. Former presidential aide Meghan Hays criticized O'Malley Dillon for claiming on Pod Save America that Harris lost because journalists asked her "small" and "dumb" questions on the campaign trail.

In their 2025 book Fight: Inside the Wildest Battle for the White House, political analysts Jonathan Allen and Amie Parnes wrote that O'Malley Dillon "surrounded herself with a guard of loyalist lieutenants who helped her gather information, micromanage decisions, and avoid direct contact with anyone who might criticize her."

Progressive magazine Current Affairs stated that O'Malley Dillon "produced a campaign that failed to inspire or connect". The magazine ranked O'Malley Dillon first place on their list of campaign staffers who should never work in politics again. The American Prospect stated that Harris's decision to retain O'Malley Dillon as campaign manager "contributed mightily to the disaster", referring to Trump's victory. In his 2025 book Uncharted, political journalist Chris Whipple quoted then-Trump campaign advisor Susie Wiles as saying that "it didn't seem like [O'Malley Dillon] even tried" to win the election.

== Personal life ==
O'Malley Dillon married Patrick Dillon, a former John Edwards campaign staffer, in 2007. The couple have three children.

A descendant of Irish Catholic immigrants, O'Malley Dillon is the second cousin of former Boston city councilmember Matt O'Malley.

Political offices
Preceded by Anthony Ornato	White House Deputy Chief of Staff; 2021–2024	Succeeded by Annie Tomasini
