= Vigor Marine Group =

American shipbuilding and ship repair company

- Formerly: Vigor Industrial
- Type: Private
- Industry: Shipbuilding; Ship repair
- Predecessor: Cascade General
- Founded: 2000 (Note: According to Vigor's website, Cascade General "establish[ed] itself anew as Vigor Industrial" in 2000 after purchasing the Port of Portland shipyard. Newspaper reports continued to list Cascade General as the owner of the shipyard for several years following the purchase. A 2006 Oregonian article referred to Vigor Industrial as a holding company for Cascade General.)
- Founder: Frank Foti
- Headquarters: Portland, Oregon, U.S.
- Area served: North America
- Revenue: $400 million to $500 million (2013)
- Owner: Antin Infrastructure Partners
- Number of employees: 2,500 (2025)
- Website: www.vigormarine.com

Vigor Marine Group, formerly Vigor Industrial, is an American shipbuilding, ship repair, and marine service company based in Portland, Oregon. Vigor operates shipyards in Oregon, Washington, California, and Virginia, with a combined total of 2,500 employees as of 2025.

Vigor grew out of Cascade General, a ship repair company that began operating at the Port of Portland's Swan Island shipyard in 1987. Cascade General purchased the shipyard from the Port of Portland in 2000 and established the name Vigor Industrial. Vigor continued operating as a repair yard for several years before establishing the barge-building company U.S. Barge in 2006 as a joint venture with Oregon Iron Works.

Vigor Industrial expanded throughout the 2010s, acquiring companies such as Todd Shipyards, Alaska Ship and Drydock, Oregon Iron Works, and Kvichak Marine Industries. Vigor recapitalized in 2019 after being acquired by a pair of private equity firms, which created Titan Acquisition Holdings as Vigor's new parent company. In 2025, Vigor Industrial consolidated with other companies under the ownership of Titan Acquisition Holdings to form the Vigor Marine Group. Private equity firm Antin Infrastructure Partners acquired Vigor Marine Group in 2026.

== History ==
=== As Cascade General ===
In 1942, what is now Vigor's Swan Island facility in Portland began operations as the Kaiser Company's Swan Island Shipyard. After the end of World War II, the Swan Island shipyard was purchased by the Port of Portland, which operated it as a repair yard. The Port leased space at the yard to various ship repair contractors, including Cascade General, which began operating there in 1987.

Due to a downturn in the ship repair market in the 1990s, the other companies operating at the Swan Island yard went out of business, leaving Cascade General as the only remaining contractor by 1994. Concerned about the string of failed companies, port commissioners decided in late 1994 to shift the shipyard to a single-operator arrangement and began a bidding process to find a company to manage the yard.

Businessmen Frank Foti and Andrew Rowe bought Cascade General in March 1995, with Foti becoming CEO; the company had no ship repair contracts at the time of purchase, and it was uncertain whether it would be able to continue operations. Despite the company's precarious financial situation, Foti and Rowe submitted a bid to become the exclusive operator of the Swan Island yard, which they ultimately secured in May 1995. The contract granted them control over the yard for five years at a rate of $5.8 million per year. Cascade General was able to secure repair work on a number of vessels in the following years and established better financial footing. By 1997, the company had sales of $132 million and a workforce of 1,200.

In 1998, Foti also purchased Washington Marine Repair in Port Angeles, Washington.

=== Purchase of the Swan Island shipyard ===
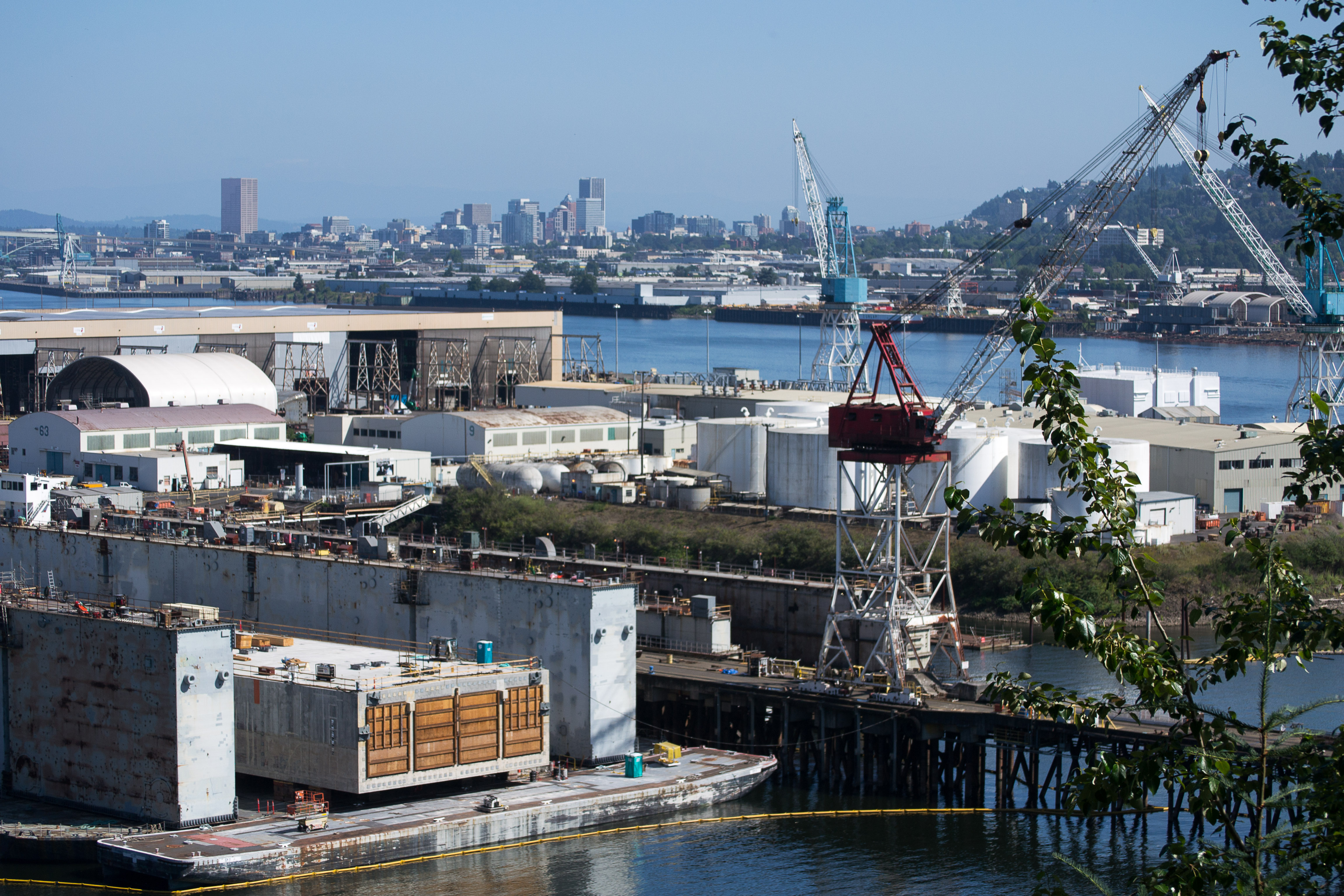
Part of Vigor's Swan Island shipyard in 2013, as viewed from Waud Bluff

In 1997–98, Cascade General engaged in negotiations with the Port of Portland about purchasing the Swan Island shipyard. After securing funding from the British shipbuilding company Cammell Laird and other lenders, Cascade General purchased the Swan Island facility from the Port of Portland in 2000 at a cost of $30.8 million. The company established the name Vigor Industrial the same year. The sale included 57 acres (23 ha) of land, cranes, dry docks, and other equipment.

Cammell Laird went into receivership in 2001, jeopardizing Cascade General's finances. Under pressure from its lenders, Cascade General decided to sell Dry Dock 4, which at the time was one of the largest dry docks in North America. The dry dock was ultimately sold to a Bahamian ship repair company for $25 million. The sale proved controversial since the dry dock was originally financed with an $84 million government bond offering in 1976.

In 2006, Vigor Industrial established the barge-building company U.S. Barge as a joint venture with Oregon Iron Works, a manufacturing company based in Clackamas, Oregon. The partnership's first barge was launched in October 2007. The U.S. Barge was eventually renamed US Fab before becoming Vigor Fab in 2013.

=== Expansion and acquisitions ===
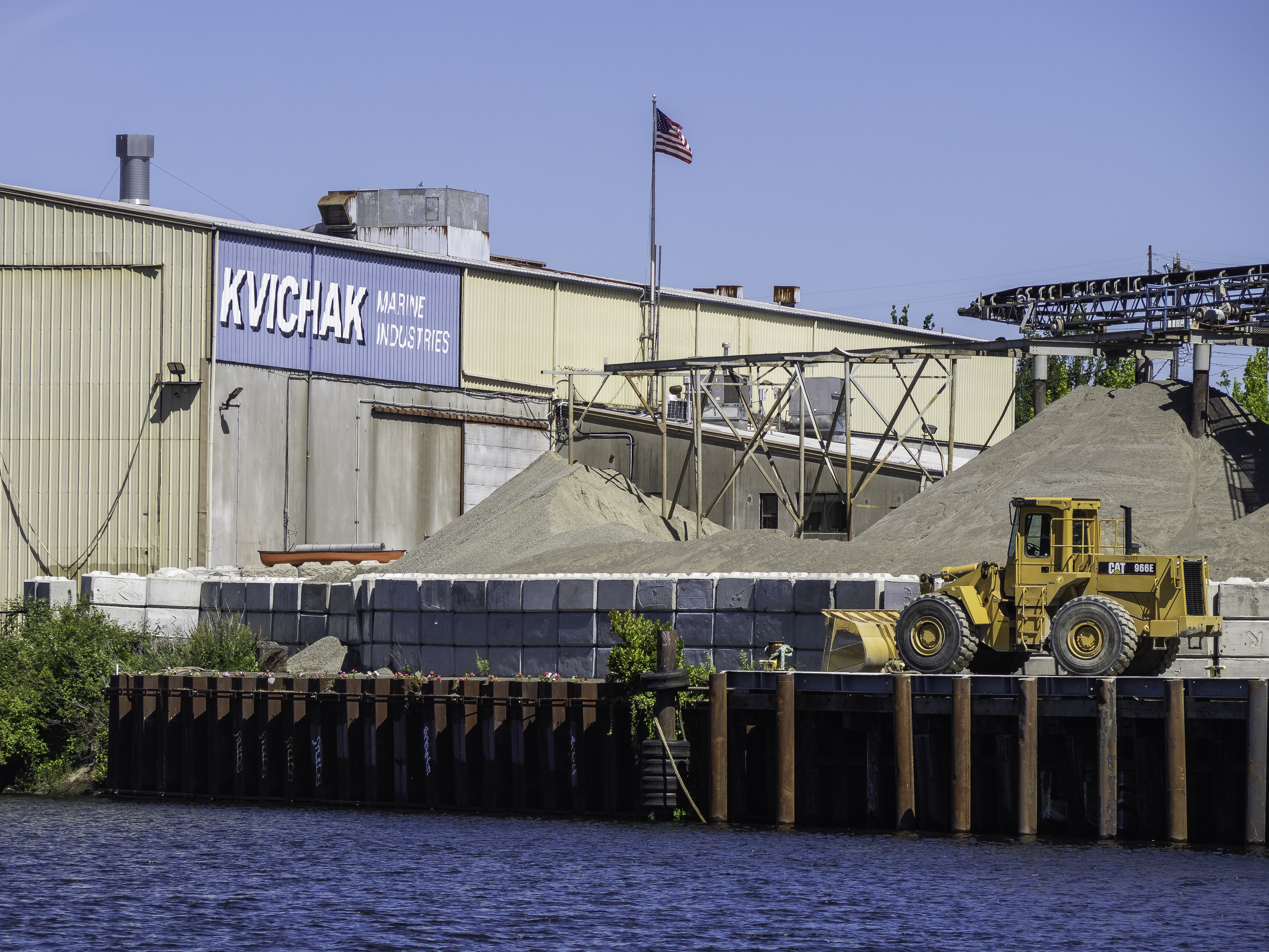
Vigor purchased Kvichak Marine Industries in 2015.

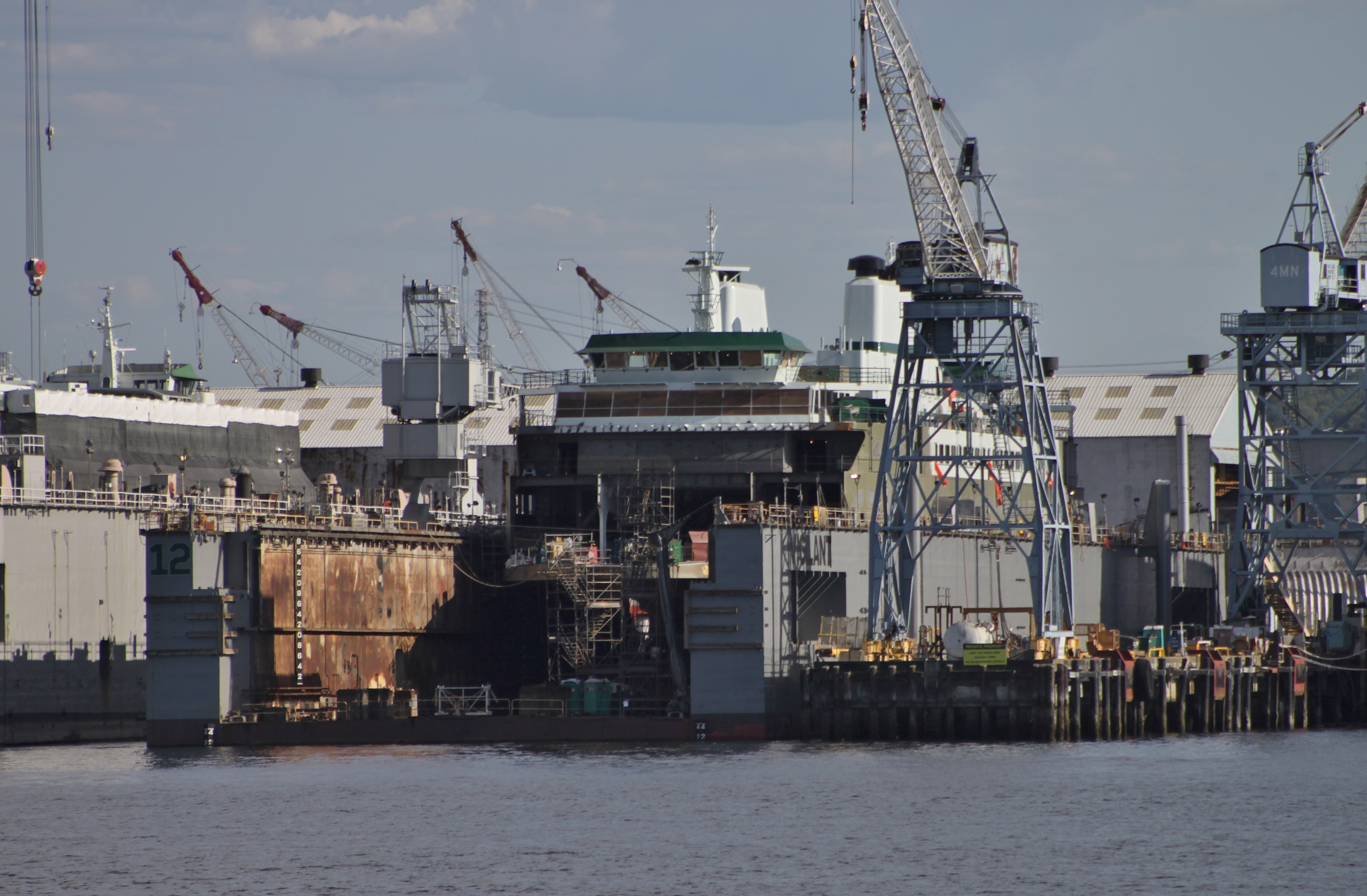
The MV Chimacum under construction at Vigor's Seattle shipyard in 2016

In 2010, Vigor purchased Marine Industries Northwest in Tacoma, Washington.

In 2011, Vigor purchased the Todd Shipyards Corporation for $130 million, acquiring its shipyards in Seattle, Bremerton, and Everett. Todd Shipyards became a wholly owned subsidiary of Vigor and began operating as Vigor Shipyards after the acquisition. Jon Talton wrote for The Seattle Times that the acquisition made Vigor "the dominant shipbuilding and marine-repair company in the Northwest".

In 2012, Vigor acquired Alaska Ship & Drydock in Ketchikan, Alaska. According to Vigor, the acquisition made the company "the largest ship repair operation by square footage on the West coast". Vigor renamed the subsidiary Vigor Alaska in 2013.

In May 2014, Vigor announced that it was merging with Oregon Iron Works. Although the companies referred to it as a merger, the deal made Oregon Iron Works a wholly owned subsidiary of Vigor.

A $40 million floating drydock, The Vigorous, was delivered to the company's Portland shipyard in August 2014. At 960 feet (290 m) long, the company claimed the dry dock was the largest in North America. Foti described the drydock as "nearly an exact duplicate" of the one Vigor had sold in 2001.

In March 2015, Vigor Industrial acquired Seattle-based aluminum workboat manufacturer Kvichak Marine Industries. Vigor designated the new subsidiary as Vigor Ballard.

Vigor announced it would be ending operations at its Everett shipyard in 2017.

Vigor announced in late 2017 that it had won a $979,390,000 contract to produce U.S. Army landing craft, designated the Maneuver Support Vessel (Light). The contract was the largest in the company's history.

In 2018, Vigor's Swan Island facility was cited for multiple safety violations by the Occupational Safety and Health Administration.

In early 2019, Vigor purchased the facilities of Christensen Yachts in Vancouver, Washington, and concurrently announced that it would be closing its facility in Ballard (at the site of the former Kvichak Marine Industries). Employees at the Ballard facility were offered to transfer to Vancouver, where Vigor was preparing to begin production of landing craft for the U.S. Army.

=== Recapitalization and merger ===
In July 2019, private equity firms The Carlyle Group and Stellex Capital Management agreed to acquire and merge Vigor Industrial with MHI Holdings LLC, a company in Norfolk, Virginia, consisting of MHI Ship Repair, Seaward Marine Services, and Accurate Marine Environmental. A parent company, Titan Acquisition Holdings, was created through the merger. Vigor described the merger as part of recapitalization process to replace the company's old investors "with new investors with the resources to operate on a global scale". Jim Marcotuli was appointed the CEO of the newly consolidated companies, replacing Frank Foti.

In 2020, Titan Acquisition Holdings purchased the San Diego Shipyard (formerly Continental Maritime of San Diego) from Huntington Ingalls Industries. Vigor announced the following year that it would be shutting down its operations in Port Angeles.

Titan Acquisition Holdings was purchased by private equity firm Lone Star Funds in 2023. Lone Sar Funds appointed Francesco Valente as Titan's CEO the following year, replacing the retiring Jim Marcotuli.

In March 2025, the Alaska Industrial Development and Export Authority announced that it would not be extending its agreement with Vigor to operate the Ketchikan Shipyard after the agreement expires in November 2025. The state-owned shipyard was formerly operated by the Alaska Ship & Drydock company, which Vigor purchased in 2012.

In June 2025, Vigor Industrial consolidated with the four other companies under the ownership of Titan Acquisition Holdings—Continental Maritime of San Diego, MHI Ship Repair and Services, Seaward Marine Services, and Accurate Marine Environmental—to form the Vigor Marine Group. The company's headquarters remained in Portland following the consolidation.

In February 2026, private equity firm Antin Infrastructure Partners reached an agreement to acquire Vigor Marine Group from Lone Star Funds.

Vigor Marine Group and Samsung Heavy Industries (SHI) announced a strategic partnership in August 2025 to repair US Navy vessels. SHI and Vigor announced a further partnership in July 2026, establishing the Pacific Northwest Advanced Maritime Training Center. As part of the Korea–US Shipbuilding Partnership initiative, the maritime training center will bring modern shipbuilding technology and expertise to workers training in the US.

== Corporate structure ==
As of 2025, Vigor Marine Group is structured into three main divisions: Maintenance & Modernization, which handles ship repairs and maintenance; Marine Services, which provides services such as cleaning and waste water treatment; and Marine Fabrication, which handles production of new vessels.

== Facilities ==
=== Shipyards ===
| Location | Coordinates | Size | Drydocks | Piers | Cranes | Ref. |
|---|---|---|---|---|---|---|
| Seattle, Washington | 47.585°N 122.355°W | 27 acres (11 ha) | 3 | 4 | 12 | |
| Portland, Oregon | 45.565°N 122.721°W | 60 acres (24 ha) | 3 | 12 | 13 | |
| San Diego, California | 32.695°N 117.1475°W | 31 acres (13 ha) (Note: 14 acres (5.7 ha) land, 17 acres (6.9 ha) waterfront) | 0 | 2 | 4 | |
| Norfolk, Virginia | 36.864°N 76.309°W | 33 acres (13 ha) (Note: 20 acres (8.1 ha) land, 13 acres (5.3 ha) waterfront) | 0 | 1 | 5 | |

=== Other facilities ===
| Location | Coordinates | Size | Ref. |
|---|---|---|---|
| Vancouver, Washington | 45.6162°N 122.6263°W | 7 acres (2.8 ha) | |
| Portsmouth, Virginia | 36.8005°N 76.2962°W | 4.5 acres (1.8 ha) | |

== Vessels constructed ==
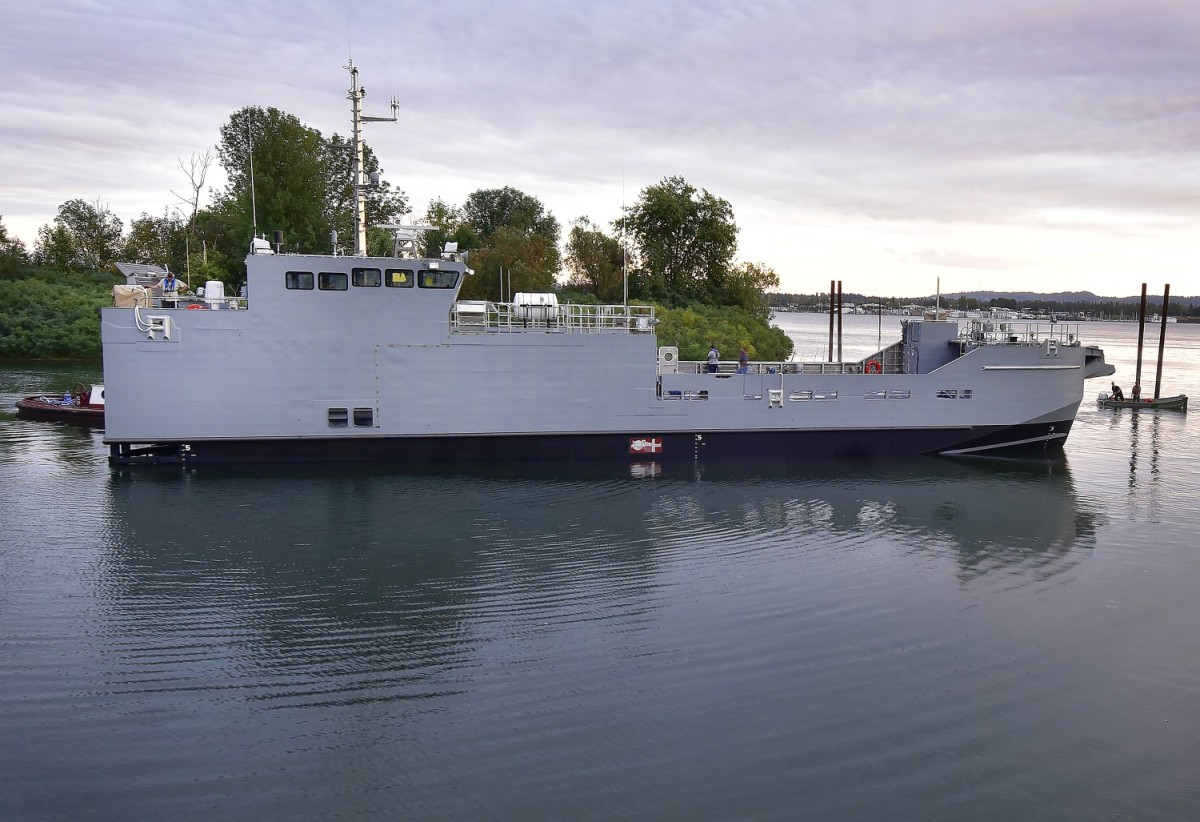
The USAV SSG Elroy F. Wells was the first MSV(L) landing craft produced by Vigor.

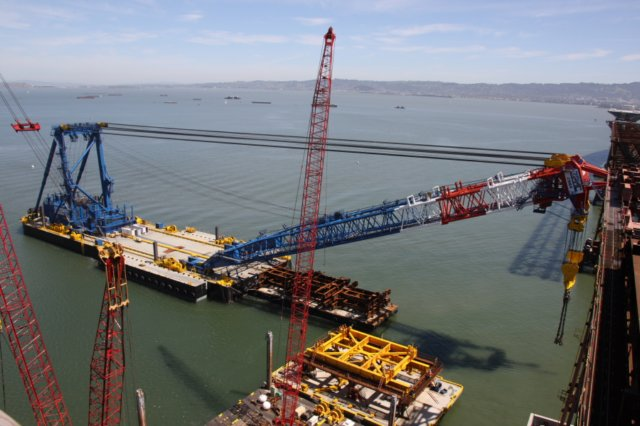
The crane barge Left Coast Lifter was used in the eastern span replacement of the San Francisco–Oakland Bay Bridge.

Vigor has constructed a wide variety of vessels, including barges, tugboats, fishing vessels, pilot boats, crew boats, ferries, and military vessels. Notable vessels constructed by Vigor and its subsidiaries are provided below.

=== Military vessels ===
Vigor has constructed several types of vessels for the U.S. military, including the Combatant Craft Medium, Combatant Craft Heavy, and Maneuver Support Vessel (Light) (MSV(L)). Individually notable ships include:

- Sea Hunter, an autonomous unmanned surface vehicle
- USAV SSG Elroy F. Wells, the lead ship of the MSV(L) class

=== Ferries ===
The following ferries were completed at Vigor's Seattle shipyard after its acquisition from Todd Pacific:

- MV Salish, for Washington State Ferries
- MV Kennewick, for Washington State Ferries
- MV Tokitae, for Washington State Ferries
- MV Samish, for Washington State Ferries
- MV Chimacum, for Washington State Ferries

The following ferry was completed at Vigor's Ketchikan shipyard after its acquisition from Alaska Ship and Drydock:

- MV Tazlina, for the Alaska Marine Highway System

=== Barges ===
Built by U.S. Barge:

- Left Coast Lifter, a crane barge

=== Other ===
- OE buoy, a wave power device
