= Matt O'Malley =

American politician

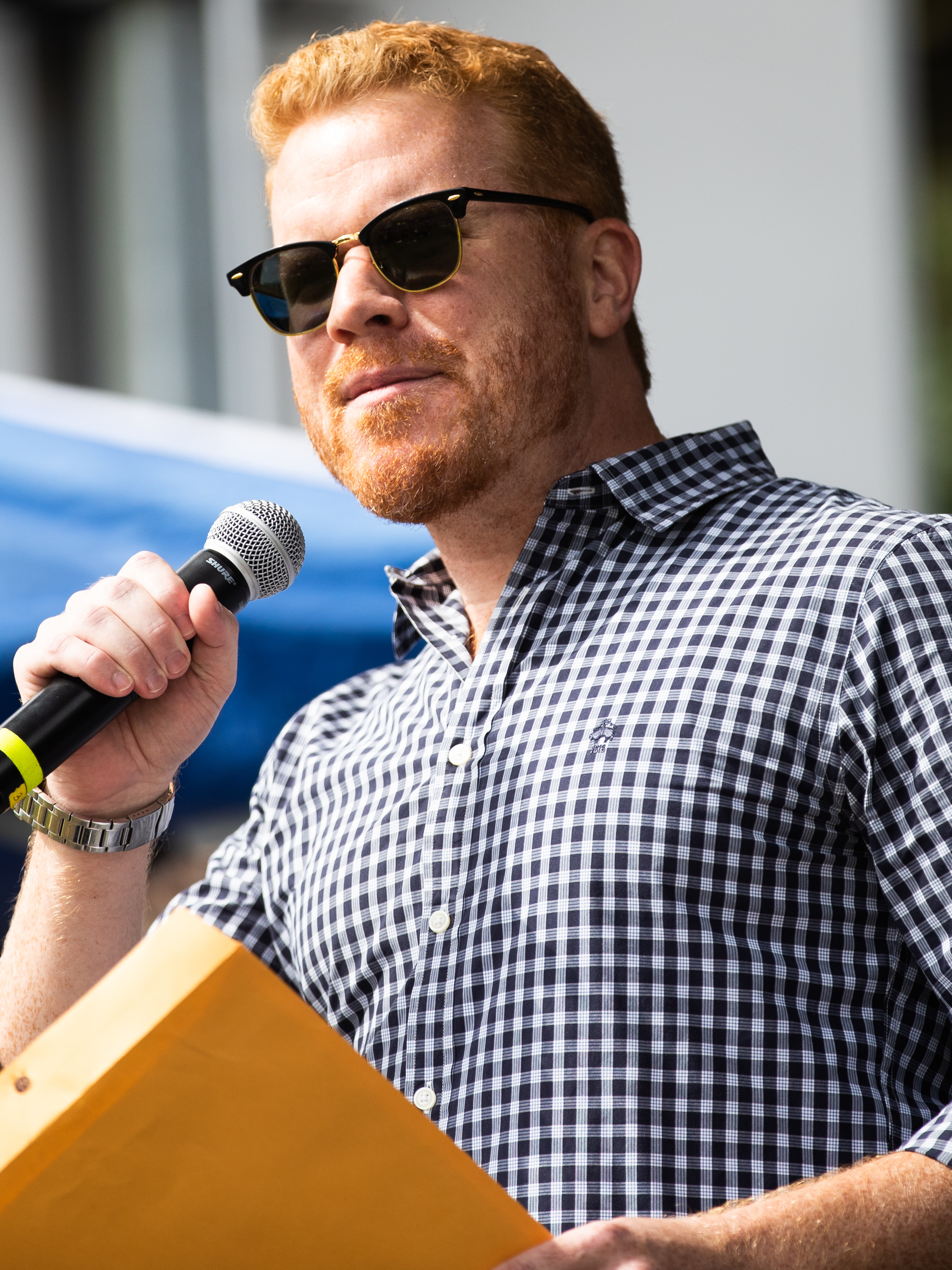
- O'Malley in 2019

President of the Boston City Council Acting
- In office March 22, 2021 – November 16, 2021
- Preceded by: Kim Janey
- Succeeded by: Kim Janey

Member of the Boston City Council from the 6th district
- In office November 16, 2010 – January 3, 2022
- Preceded by: John M. Tobin Jr.
- Succeeded by: Kendra Lara

Personal details
- Born: September 20, 1979 (age 47) Roslindale, Massachusetts, U.S.
- Party: Democratic
- Spouse: Kathryn Niforos
- Relations: Jen O'Malley Dillon (second cousin)
- Education: George Washington University (BA)
- Profession: Boston City Councilor
- Committees: Former Chair of the Committee on Government Operations; Current Chair of the Committee on Environment & Sustainability
- Website: City Council; Matt O'Malley

Matthew Joseph O'Malley (born September 20, 1979) is an American politician and businessman who served six terms a member of the Boston City Council. He was elected as the District 6 representative in a special election on November 16, 2010, and was re-elected in 2011, 2013, 2015, and 2017. His district included the neighborhoods of West Roxbury and Jamaica Plain, parts of Roslindale and Roxbury, and the Back of the Hill. As the most senior member of the council, O'Malley succeeded Kim Janey as acting council president after Janey became acting mayor of Boston in March 2021. In late 2021, he became the chief sustainability officer of Vicinity Energy, a U.S. district energy subsidiary of Antin Infrastructure Partners.

== Early life and career ==
O'Malley grew up in Roslindale and now owns a home in West Roxbury. He is a graduate of Boston Latin School as well as the George Washington University, where he studied Political Science and English.

In high school, he served as an intern at Boston City Hall for former At-Large City Councilor, Peggy Davis-Mullen, and as a Ward Fellow for former Treasurer and Receiver-General of Massachusetts, Joe Malone, which he says "helped shape my interest in local government."

His professional political experience began in managing the campaign for Suffolk County Sheriff Andrea Cabral in 2004, the first female in the Commonwealth of Massachusetts history to hold the position. O'Malley also served as the Director of Legislative Affairs for Suffolk County, where he worked to implement numerous crime prevention initiatives.

For the following two years, O'Malley served as the political director for MassEquality. Additionally, O'Malley spent some time working as a political consultant for both the Steven Grossman and Stephen Pagliuca campaigns respectively. In 2010, O'Malley was elected for City Council during a special election.

O'Malley was a member of the Democratic State Committee from 2008 to 2012 and the advisory committee for Project Hope, an anti-poverty agency in Boston. He also raised funds through the Boston Marathon for Children's Hospital and Habitat for Humanity, Greater Boston.

== Boston City Council ==
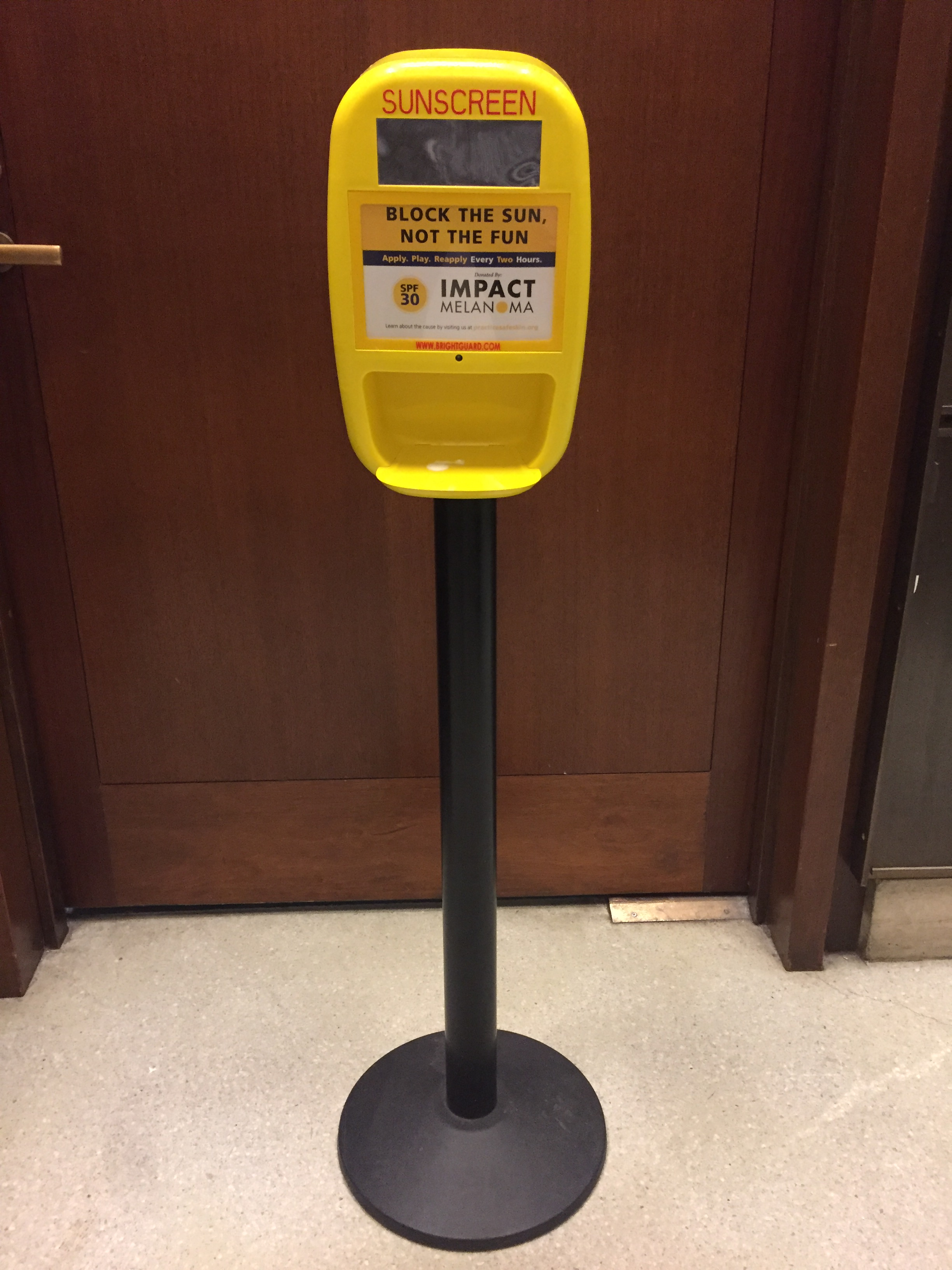
Free sunscreen dispensers (pictured above) are in parks throughout Boston.

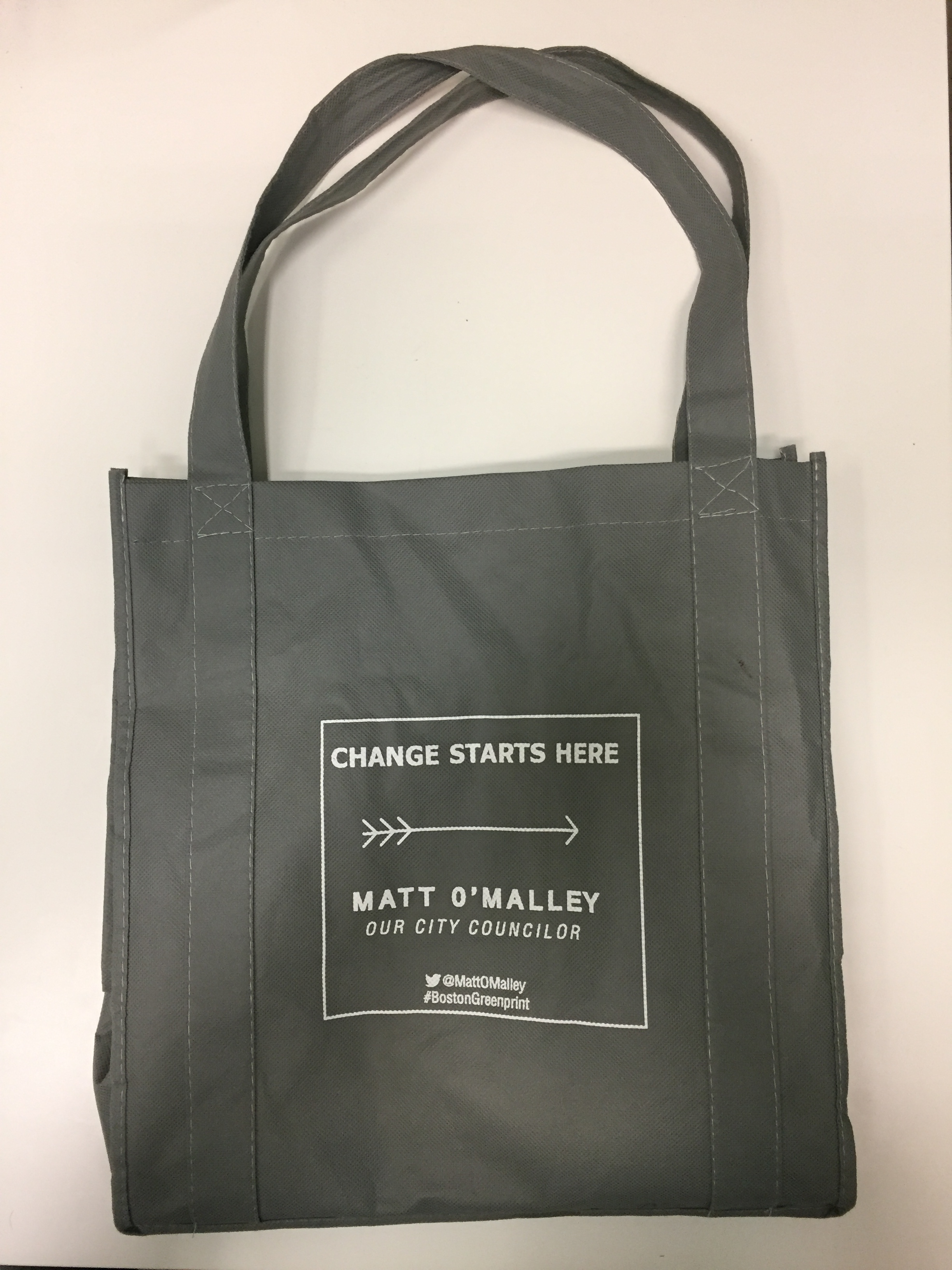
A reusable bag designed by O'Malley.

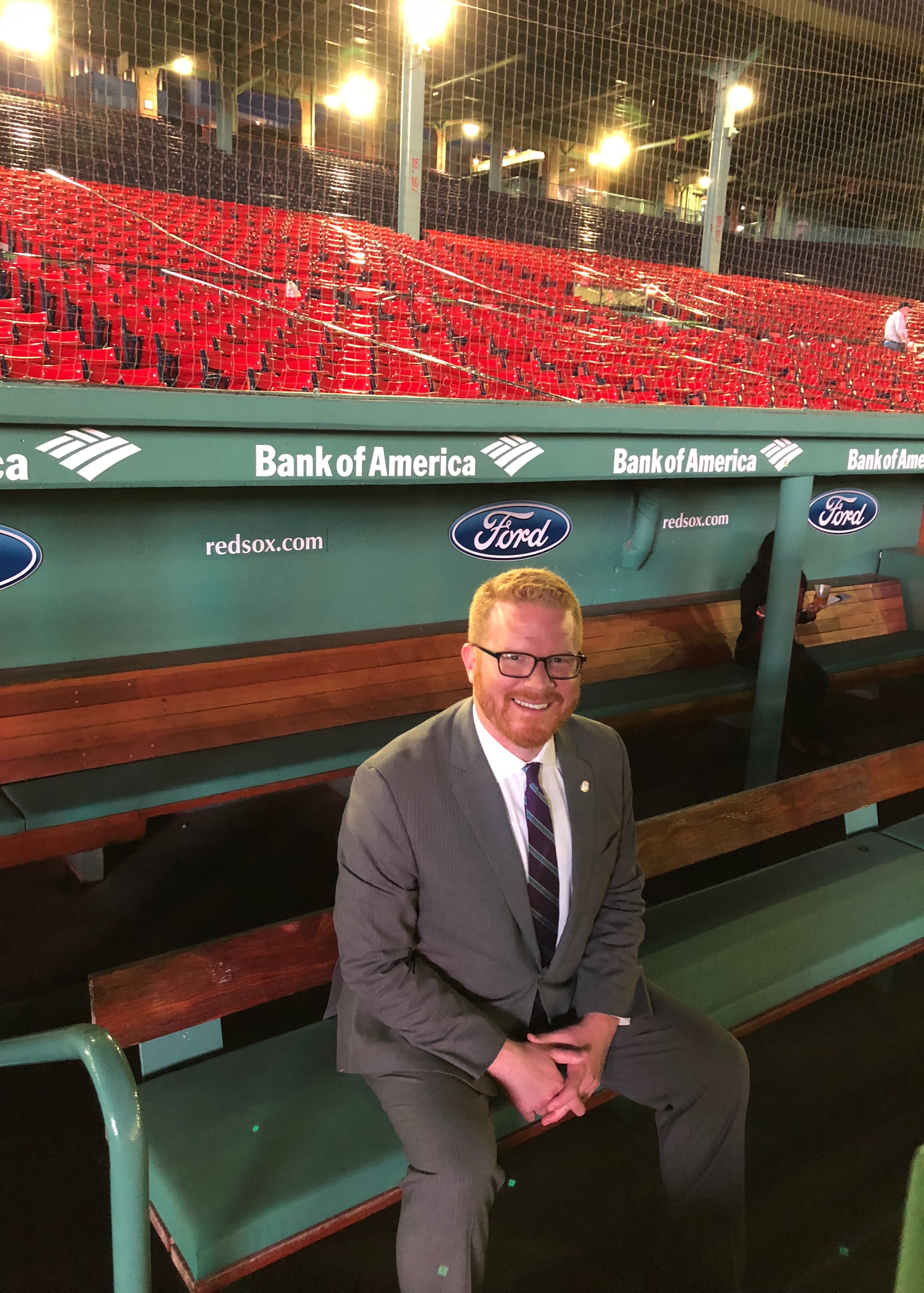
O'Malley at Fenway Park in 2018

O'Malley chaired the Environment and Parks Committee, and was co-chair of the Education committee and the Arts and Culture committee.

He also served on the City Council Committees on Arts & Culture, Ways & Means, and the Special Committee on Charter Reform. In 2012 and 2013 Councilor O'Malley served as Chair of the City Council's Government Operations Committee and as Chair of the Environment Committee in 2011.

=== First term (2010 and 2011) ===
O'Malley was elected to the 6th district seat in the 2009 Boston City Council election.

O'Malley pushed for the expansion of a drug drop off program in Boston as well as the creation of a Silver Alert system for citizens with Alzheimer's disease and other cognitive impairments. He has held public hearings to discuss vacated public school buildings, Arborway Year in Jamaica Plain, and snow removal jurisdiction (City B). Additionally, O'Malley pushed for paperless pay stubs for City of Boston employees, and continues working toward increasing the availability of tap water in open spaces and parks across Boston.

=== Second term (2012 and 2013) ===
O'Malley was reelected in the 2011 Boston City Council election.

In 2012, O'Malley pushed for new energy-saving considerations in City buildings such as City Hall to measure how much energy it was using and whether or not it was efficient. He also introduced a hearing order to explore curbside composting in Boston. His hearing on ways to reduce to litter in Boston led to the creation of Clean Boston Task Force, a group of Boston residents who meet to discuss problem areas in Boston, and solutions that have worked in their communities.

In December 2012, the City Council passed an ordinance authored by O'Malley to greatly increase the scope and amount of inspections made to rental properties in Boston. It went into effect.

=== Third term (2014 and 2015) ===
==== Unsuccessful campaign for the council presidency ====
O'Malley was reelected to a third term in the 2013 Boston City Council election. O'Malley won 18,204 votes, equal to 85% of the district vote. This beat the record for most overall votes ever received by a district city councilor in Boston, which had been held by Thomas Menino since 1983. After the city council election, O'Malley sought the support of others elected to the incoming council for him to be the next president of the Boston City Council. Similarly seeking support was Bill Linehan (a conservative member of the council) and Tito Jackson. O'Malley and Jackson were both considered to be members of the council's liberal wing (which had five returning members, including the two of them). Linehan was regarded as all-but-sure to win the backing from the six other returning council members (which included himself). This left the council's two newly-elected members (Timothy McCarthy and Michelle Wu) as the swing-votes for the council presidency. There was an open agreement between O'Malley and Jackson that if one of them faltered in their efforts to secure support, they would bow out in favor of the other.

Quickly, the council's liberal wing largely quickly got behind O'Malley's candidacy, rather than Jackson's. O'Malley was initially able to secure a pledge of support from McCarthy, which put him a position to have six votes (in addition to his own vote and Jackson's vote). This still was one shy of the needed majority, as councilor-elect Wu had not committed her support to him (despite being considered a part of the incoming council's liberal wing that had otherwise gotten behind his candidacy). McCarthy soon withdrew his backing from O'Malley and gave his support to Linehan instead. This gave Linehan majority support. Soon after receiving McCarthy's support, Linehan was also able to bolster his support by securing the backing of the progressive-leaning Wu (despite their ideological differences). With O'Malley having faltered, Jackson ramped up his effort to secure the backing of a majority of councilors. However, he too was unsuccessful. After Jackson failed, Ayanna Pressley (another member of the council's liberal wing) ran a last-minute challenge against Linehan. Ultimately, Linehan won the council vote, beating Pressley by 8–5 (with O'Malley being among five councilors who voted for Pressley).

==== Other matters ====
One of O'Malley's proudest achievements was getting free sunscreen dispensers placed in parks throughout the city. In the summer of 2015, with help from IMPACT Melanoma and Make Big Change (MBC), dispensers were installed and have since inspired cities around the country to do the same. These dispensers were featured on season 28, episode 3 of "The Simpsons," (The Town) when Homer takes the family on a "hate-cation" to Boston.

In 2015, O’Malley and councilor Josh Zakim filed an order for a public hearing on gas leaks in Boston. A hearing and a working session were held by the City Council's Environment & Parks Committee to examine the issue. Councilors O’Malley and Zakim also sponsored two City Council resolutions in support of state legislation on roadway gas leak repair and protecting customers from paying for unaccounted for gas. Both were unanimously passed by the council.

=== Fourth term (2016 and 2017) ===
O'Malley was reelected to a fourth term in the 2015 Boston City Council election. After his reelection, O'Malley had received support from several liberal members of the council to be the next council president. However, Michelle Wu (who had the backing of outgoing council president Bill Linehan) received greater support among all who were elected to serve in the 2016–17 council. He withdrew himself from consideration on the eve of the vote, and Wu was ultimately elected unanimously.

In 2016, O'Malley successfully passed an ordinance regarding the elimination of gas leaks in the City of Boston following a hearing on the environmental and economic impacts of gas leaks the year before. Docket #0622 aims to eliminate gas leaks in the City of Boston within six years of the passage of the ordinance. Earlier that year, O'Malley passed an ordinance dubbed the "Puppy Mill Bill," that would prohibit pet shops in Boston from selling dogs, cats or rabbits and would prevent animal sales in public parks and on city streets. As a result, Boston joined more than 120 municipalities that have banned the sale of commercially bred puppies and kittens from pet shops. Its aim was to diminish large-scale breeding facilities employed by these commercial facilities, many of which have multiple violations of the Federal Animal Welfare Act.

In August 2016, the City Council voted 11–2 to adopt a resolution by O'Malley and Tito Jackson that expressed the council's opposition 2016 Massachusetts Question 2, a ballot measure that would have authorized the expansion of the number of charter schools in the state.

In October 2017, the Boston City Council voted to unanimously approve a resolution by O'Malley and fellow councilor Michelle Wu, having the city adopt Community Choice Aggregation.

Starting in 2017, O'Malley began hosting a podcast called, the "O'Pod," where he interviews fellow elected officials, city workers, notable people, his staff, family, and friends. Guests included, Congressman Joe Kennedy III, 2018 Boston Marathon women's winner Desiree Linden, and former Boston City Councilor John M. Tobin Jr.

In December 2017, O'Malley received unanimous support from his fellow Boston City Council members in passing an ordinance he had authored with fellow councilor Michelle Wu to ban single-use plastic bags from stores in the City of Boston. Mayor Marty Walsh signed it into law despite his administration having previously opposed such a ban when it was previously debated by the Council in 2016. The law went into effect in the fall of 2018. This achievement came with many environmental benefits, including litter and pollution reduction.

=== Fifth term (2018 and 2019) ===
O'Malley was reelected to a fifth term in the 2017 Boston City Council election.

In 2019, O'Malley and fellow councilor Andrea Campbell proposed the idea of a vacancy tax on residential and commercial properties that have been abandoned.

In December 2019, the Boston City Council passed an ordinance that O'Malley had introduced with Michelle Wu that protects local wetlands and promote adaption to climate change. Mayor Walsh signed it into law later that month.

O'Malley endorsed Elizabeth Warren's candidacy in the 2020 Democratic Party presidential primaries.

=== Sixth term (2020 and 2021) ===
Malley was reelected in the 2019 Boston City Council election, running unopposed In the weeks before the 2020–22 Boston City Council term, support in the election of a new council president was initially sharply divided in their support between O'Malley and Kim Janey. Janey, with an important endorsement from Michelle Wu, ultimately secured enough pledges of support to secure her the council presidency. On January 6, 2020, O'Malley joined all member (except Frank Baker, who abstained) in unanimously electing Janey. After Janey (as council president) became the acting mayor of Boston in March 2021, O'Malley began serving as president of the council in an acting capacity, officially as president pro tempore.

In October 2021, O'Malley voted against legislation that was passed by the City Council which restricted the use of rubber bullets, tear gas, and pepper spray by the Boston Police Department.

In October 2021, the City Council passed and Acting Mayor Janey signed into law an ordinance sponsored by O'Malley requiring buildings in the city that are larger than 20,000 square feet to reach net-zero carbon emissions by the year 2050 and setting emissions reporting requirements for such buildings. For years, joined by fellow council members Michelle Wu and Lydia Edwards, O'Malley had pushed to have the city divest its financial resources from fossil fuels. In November 2021, Wu (as mayor) signed such an ordinance into law.

In December 2020, O'Malley announced that he would not seek re-election in the 2021 Boston City Council election, making his sixth term his final.

== Post-Council employment ==
In December 2021, O'Malley announced his new position as chief sustainability officer for Vicinity Energy, the largest district energy provider in the United States. Vicinity Energy is an American district energy subsidiary of Antin Infrastructure Partners.

== Personal life ==
O'Malley and his wife, Kathryn, have two daughters. His second cousin is Jen O'Malley Dillon.

Political offices
Preceded by Kim Janey	President of the Boston City Council; Acting; 2021	Succeeded by Kim Janey
