= Kendall Cogeneration Station =

Energy facility in Cambridge, Massachusetts, U.S.

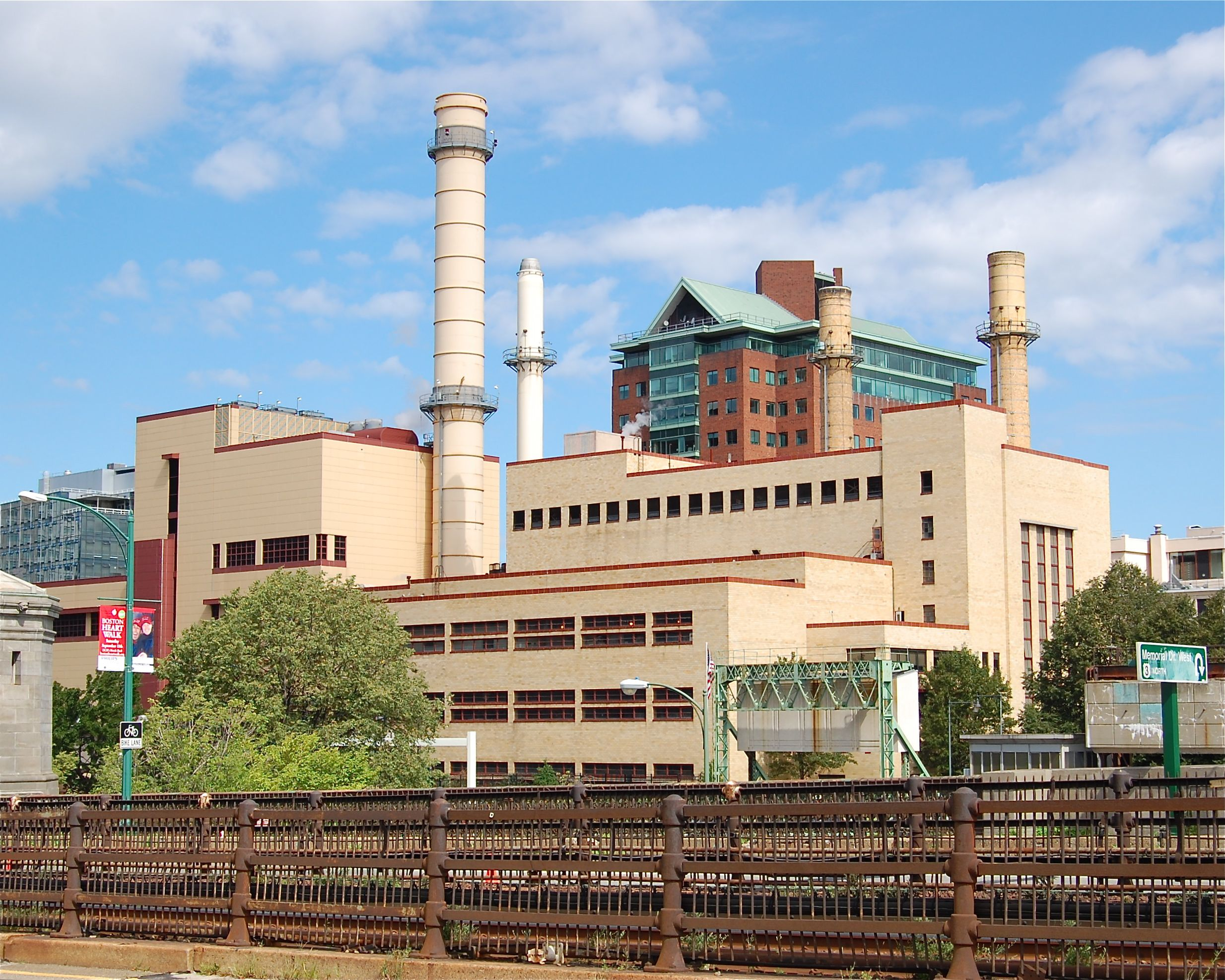
- The station in 2010
- Country: United States
- Location: Cambridge, Massachusetts
- Coordinates: 42.36313°N 71.08011°W
- Status: Active
- Construction began: 1949
- Owner: Vicinity Energy

Thermal power station
- Primary fuel: Natural gas
- Cogeneration?: Yes

Power generation
- Nameplate capacity: 234.7 MW

External links
- Commons: Related media on Commons

The Kendall facility is an energy facility owned by Vicinity Energy that produces steam and electricity to the cities of Boston and Cambridge. Owned by GenOn Energy in 2012, in 2013 Veolia Energy North America purchased the plant from NRG Energy. In 2020, Antin Infrastructure Partners acquired Veolia Energy North America and renamed it Vicinity Energy.

== History ==
The Kendall power plant was built in 1949, operating in "relative obscurity" for some time as it was only turned on when high energy levels were demanded.

In 2003, the power plant switched to natural gas from oil and became more active. In 2004, there were complaints from environmentalists that water intake and water discharge was damaging marine life.

A 2006 permit issued by federal and state environmental officials was appealed by power plant officials on the grounds of being too strict.

The plan for the GenOn Kendall Cogeneration Station to slice its hot water discharge was revealed in February 2011. It had been negotiated along with the Environmental Protection Agency New England office and state regulators. The plan called for converting hot water to steam to be sent to Boston, possibly by a pipe. The agreement ended "a six-year battle between the plant’s operators and environmentalists over its state and federal water discharge permits." Veolia Energy North America was working on the pipe, to be completed by 2016. As such, waste heat from the Kendall Cogeneration Station in Cambridge would heat buildings in Boston. The pipeline extension was completed in 2013.

In January 2012, the station had a production capacity of 256 megawatts, and in 2010 produced roughly 717,000 metric tons of carbon dioxide. While it used natural gas primarily, it also had oil as a backup to produce both electricity and steam energy.

In 2012, the plant was owned by GenOn Energy. In 2013 Veolia Energy North America purchased the plant from NRG Energy. In 2020, Antin Infrastructure Partners acquired Veolia Energy North America and renamed it Vicinity Energy.

In 2024, Vicinity Energy installed a 42-megawatt electric-powered boiler. Demolition necessary for installation of a 35-megawatt industrial heat pump began in 2025. The heat pump will use water from the Charles River for district heating of about 70 million square feet of buildings in Boston and Cambridge.
