= Anthony Ornato =

American government official

Tony Ornato
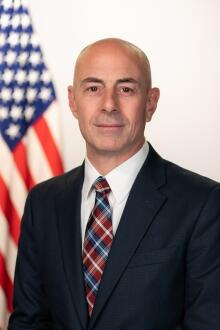

White House Deputy Chief of Staff for Operations
- In office December 7, 2019 – January 20, 2021
- President: Donald Trump
- Preceded by: Dan Walsh
- Succeeded by: Jen O'Malley Dillon

Personal details
- Party: Independent
- Education: University of New Haven (BS, MS); University of Oklahoma (MA)

Anthony Michael Ornato is the former assistant director of the United States Secret Service Office of Training. He was the service's 34th special agent in charge who headed the security detail of president Donald Trump until being detailed to the White House where the president named him White House Deputy Chief of Staff for operations in December 2019. After his tenure as a government Senior Executive Service detailee in the Trump administration, he returned to the Secret Service where he worked as the assistant director in the office of training until August 29, 2022.

== Early life ==
Ornato is a native of Connecticut. His family owned a tavern near New Haven popular with police and firefighters.

Ornato received a bachelor and master of science degree from the School of Forensic Science at University of New Haven (1995 and 1999), and a master of administrative leadership from the University of Oklahoma in 2016.

== Career ==
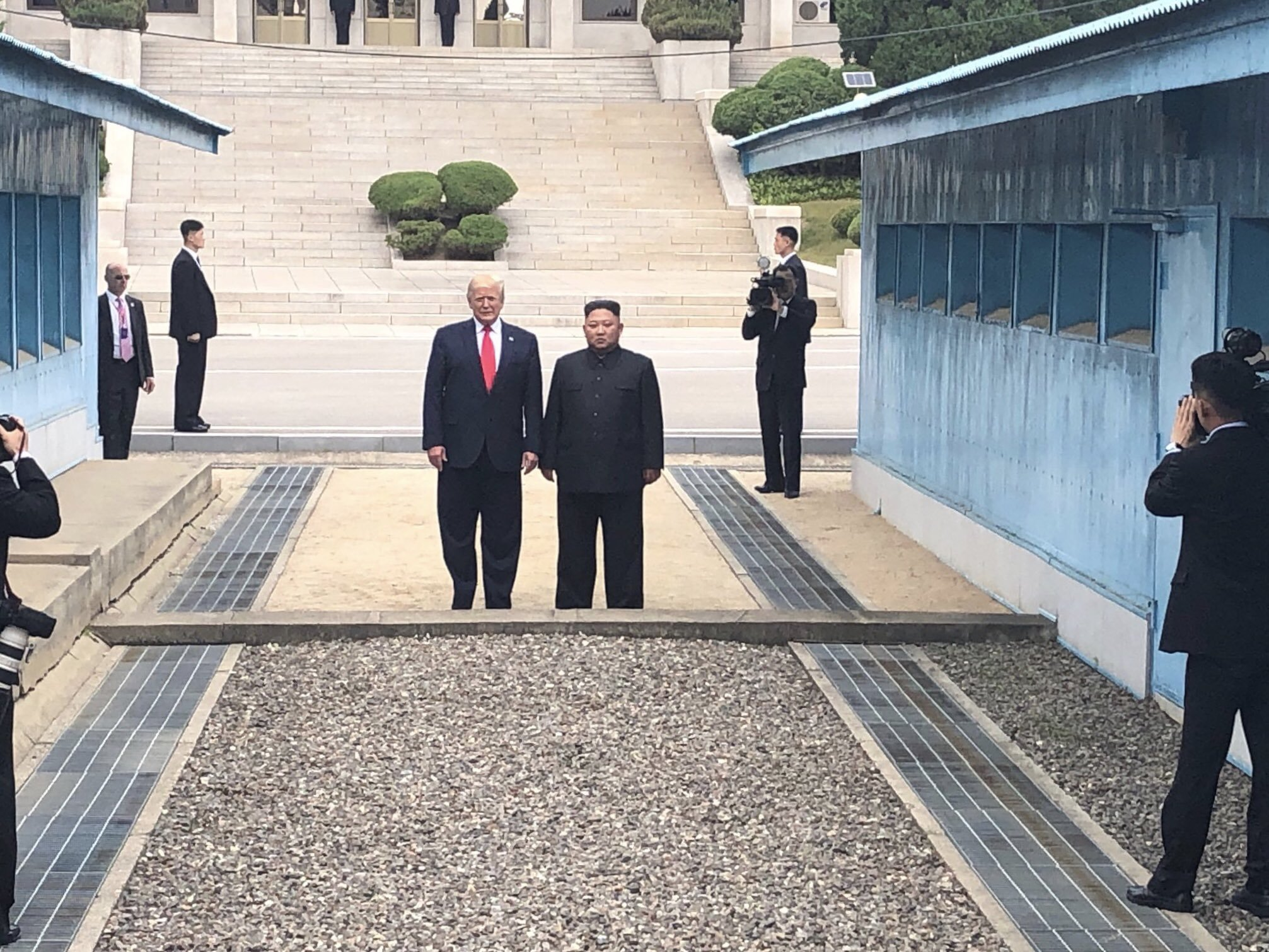
Donald Trump in North Korea territory, accompanied by Anthony Ornato, background left

Ornato was a police officer for two years in Waterbury, CT. He became a special agent in 1997 and worked as a criminal investigator in the New Haven Resident Office. He has been a member of the U.S. Secret Service for over 25 years. After joining the Secret Service in 1997, he worked in a variety of departments, including the Presidential Protective Division, Protective Operations, and Criminal Investigations. He has also worked as a special agent.

Ornato worked in the Presidential Protective Division during the administrations of George W. Bush, Barack Obama and Donald Trump. Ornato was promoted a number of times under the Obama administration. In July 2019, when Trump became the first U.S. president to cross into North Korea, the Associated Press debunked unsubstantiated claims circulated on social media that Trump entered the Demilitarized Zone unaccompanied and without military protection, reporting that he had been accompanied by Ornato as his personal security.

After having worked on the Trump presidential detail for three years, Ornato moved to role of Deputy Chief of Staff for Operations. By that time Ornato was happy working at Secret Service headquarters and did not want the job according to three former White House officials. He rejected the assignment several times, but began to feel pressured by Secret Service leadership. But when Trump called to tell him he was putting Ornato in the job, he believed he had no choice but to take it, according to those officials In December 2019, Trump announced that Ornato would be detailed to the White House stating, "The United States Secret Service Deputy Assistant Director, Anthony Ornato, will become my new Deputy Chief of Staff for Operations." Ornato was not a political advisor and not employed by the Trump administration as had been reported. He did not take a leave of absence and, as an SES detailee, was on loan from and employed by the US Secret Service during his assignment. With this shift Ornato left his role as protective agent to become a manager responsible for all aspects of security, travel, information technology, military operations, scheduling and operational logistics required in support of the President," managing a budget of approximately $800 million and leading a workforce of over 5,000 persons. He and his team provided management and administration services, human resources support, financial oversight, and medical support. He managed the Residence staff assigned to the president and the Executive Office of the President complex. Ornato also had responsibility for a variety of offices related to the White House, including Camp David, the Presidential Airlift Group, the Presidential Marine Helicopter Squadron, the White House Communications Agency. He was also responsible for the "Presidential Continuity Policy, Plans and Requirements."

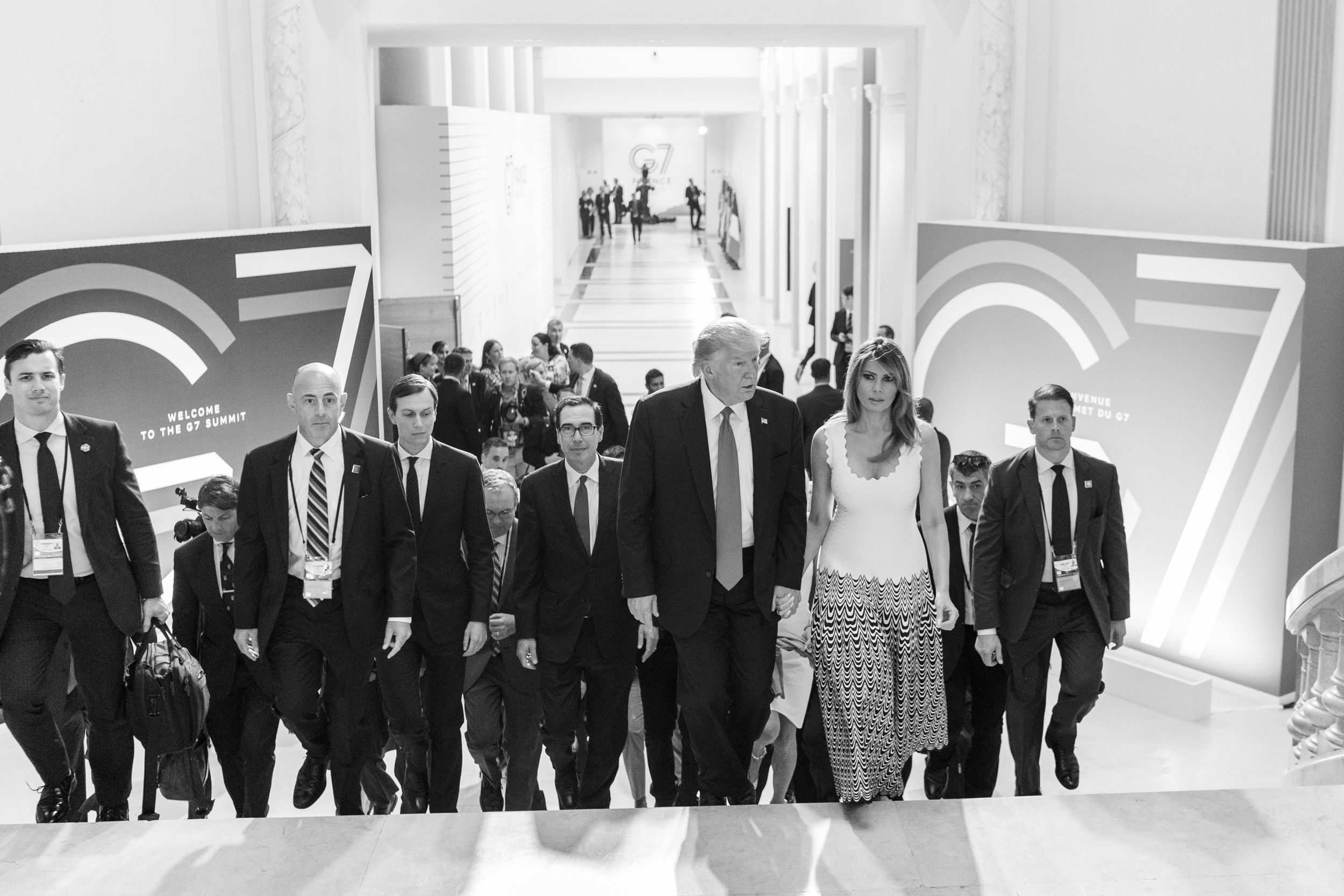
Anthony Ornato to the left of Jared Kushner, Steven Mnuchin, Donald Trump and Melania Trump

During his tenure on Trump's staff he helped to organize the Donald Trump photo op at St. John's Church, an event wherein law enforcement used tear gas and other riot control tactics to forcefully clear peaceful protesters from Lafayette Square amid the 2020 George Floyd protests. Ornato had participated in coordinating the logistics of the event. The Project on Government Oversight noted that "it remains unclear whether Ornato's role in the events of Lafayette Square ever came under scrutiny."

In mid December, during a meeting Trump was holding with Rudy Giuliani, Sidney Powell, Michael Flynn, and former Overstock.com CEO Patrick M. Byrne, Cassidy Hutchinson texted Ornato saying, “the west wing is UNHINGED.” Ornato responded to her, saying, "oh holy hell." In late December 2020, Trump aides consulted with Ornato regarding the president’s desire to ride in a motorcade accompanying January 6 marchers protesting the election of Joe Biden as the next President of the United States. Trump later said he wanted to accompany the marchers but that he was prevented from doing so. In an interview in April with The Washington Post, Trump expressed regret over not marching to the U.S. Capitol the day his supporters stormed the building. He said he pressed to join the march that day but was stopped by his security detail. “Secret Service wouldn’t let me,” Trump said. “I wanted to go. I wanted to go so badly. Secret Service says you can’t go. I would have gone there in a minute.”

During her June 2022 testimony before the House Select Committee on the January 6 Attack, former Trump White House aide Cassidy Hutchinson said she had been told by Ornato that after Trump got into the presidential SUV following his January 6 Ellipse rally, hoping to drive to the Capitol as his supporters marched there, his lead Secret Service agent Robert Engel told him it was too dangerous and informed him they were returning to the White House. Hutchinson said Ornato told her Trump became irate and attempted to grab the steering wheel of the vehicle, and lunged at Engel's clavicles. She testified Engel was present with Ornato as he related the incident but never contradicted the account. CNN reported three days after Hutchinson's testimony that it had spoken with two Secret Service agents who had heard accounts of the incident from multiple other agents since February 2021, including Trump's driver. Although details differed, agents confirmed there was an angry confrontation, with one agent relating that Trump "tried to lunge over the seat — for what reason, nobody had any idea," but no one asserted Trump attacked Engel. A Secret Service source stated that Ornato, Engel, and the driver were prepared to testify that these events did not happen. A separate Secret Service official told CNN that Engel denied that Trump grabbed at the steering wheel or lunged toward an agent on his detail, and that Ornato denied telling Hutchinson such. Politico reported the same day that Engel told the committee during an early 2022 deposition that he had kept his full account of the incident from his Secret Service colleagues for at least fourteen months.

Hutchinson testified that on the morning of January 6, Ornato told White House Chief of Staff Mark Meadows that participants in Trump’s rally had weapons, and that Ornato told her he had also informed Trump. Keith Kellogg, an advisor to Pence, reportedly told Ornato that Pence refused with good reason to be evacuated from the Capitol by the Secret Service as the rioting was proceeding. But Politico’s Kyle Cheney reported that Ornato testified to the Jan. 6 committee that he incorrectly told Mark Meadows that Pence had already been evacuated when Trump sent a tweet attacking Pence at 2:24 p.m.

The Washington Post reporter Carol Leonnig, author of a 2021 book on the Secret Service, characterized Engel and Ornato as "very, very close to President Trump." During an MSNBC interview she stated: "some people accused them of at times being enablers and 'yes men' of the president — particularly Tony Ornato — and very much people who wanted to ... see him pleased." However, those who have worked closely with Ornato contradict Leonnig's claim of him being a "Yes" man and recalled Ornato informing President Trump when his requests were not possible.

Ornato has been interviewed twice by the United States House Select Committee on the January 6 Attack, and the Secret Service announced that Ornato will be made available to testify under oath to the committee.

In a December 17, 2025, deposition in front of the House Judiciary Committee, regarding the events of January 6, 2021, Jack Smith, former Special Counsel, testified that “with Ms. Hutchinson, at least one of the issues was a number of the things that she gave evidence on were secondhand hearsay, were things that she had heard from other people.” Smith testified that he spoke to “officers who were there, including the officer in the car” and that “the version of events that he explained was not the same as what Cassidy Hutchinson said she heard from somebody secondhand.” Smith indicated he had not determined whether Hutchinson’s testimony was reliable.

Political offices
Preceded by Dan Walsh	White House Deputy Chief of Staff for Operations; 2019–2021	Succeeded by Jen O'Malley Dillon; Bruce Reed
