= Natalie Quillian =

American political strategist

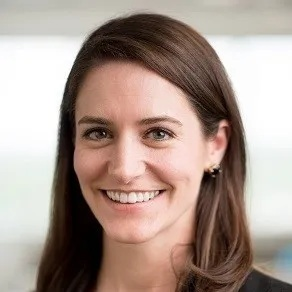
- Quillian in 2020

White House Deputy Chief of Staff for Implementation
- In office February 8, 2023 – January 20, 2025 Serving with Annie Tomasini (Note: Succeeded Jen O'Malley Dillon who served from January 20, 2021 to February 8, 2024.), Bruce Reed
- President: Joe Biden
- Chief of Staff: Jeff Zients
- Preceded by: Katie Walsh (2017) (Note: Deputy Chief of Staff for Implementation position was re-established since the First Trump administration in 2017)
- Succeeded by: Nicholas F. Luna (Strategic Implementation)

White House Deputy Coronavirus Response Coordinator
- In office January 20, 2021 – April 5, 2022
- President: Joe Biden
- Leader: Jeff Zients
- Preceded by: Office established
- Succeeded by: Lisa Barclay

Personal details
- Party: Democratic
- Education: Middlebury College (BA); Princeton University (MPA)

Natalie Quillian is an American political strategist who served as a White House Deputy Chief of Staff during the Biden administration from February 2023 to January 2025. She previously served as the White House Deputy Coronavirus Response Coordinator from January 2021 to April 2022. Quillian was a senior advisor to Denis McDonough, the White House Chief of Staff, during the Obama administration.

== Early life and education ==
Quillian completed a bachelor's degree in mathematics from Middlebury College. She earned a master's degree from the Princeton School of Public and International Affairs.

== Career ==
Quillian was a Presidential Management Fellow in the Office of the Secretary of Defense where she worked as a political officer for the Embassy of the United States, Kabul. From 2010 to 2011, she was a Next Generation National Security Fellow where she served as a special assistant to the principal deputy Under Secretary of Defense for Policy. During the Obama administration, Quillian worked at The Pentagon and the United States National Security Council. She later served as a senior advisor to White House chief of staff Denis McDonough.

=== Biden administration ===
Quillian was a deputy campaign manager during the Joe Biden 2020 presidential campaign. She later served as the deputy COVID-19 Response Coordinator for 15 months under Jeff Zients. She left the Biden administration in April 2022. She rejoined the administration in the fall of 2022.

In February 2023, following Jeff Zients' appointment to White House Chief of Staff, Quillian was appointed as a White House Deputy Chief of Staff. In her role, Quillian focuses on managing the implementation of Biden's major pieces of legislation, working closely with senior advisers Mitch Landrieu and John Podesta to coordinate implementation of the bipartisan infrastructure law and the climate provisions of the Inflation Reduction Act.
