= Mary Lou Reed =

American politician and environmentalist (born 1930)

Member of the Idaho Senate from the 4th district
- In office 1984–1996

Personal details
- Born: Mary Louise Case; October 20, 1930 (age 95) Klamath Falls, Oregon, U.S.
- Party: Democratic
- Spouse: Scott White Reed (m. 1953; died 2015)
- Relations: Julia Reed (granddaughter)
- Children: 2, including Bruce
- Education: Mills College (BA)

Mary Louise Reed (née Case; October 20, 1930) is an American politician and environmentalist. She served as a member of the Idaho Senate for the 4th district from 1984 to 1996.

== Early life and education ==
A native of Klamath Falls, Oregon, Reed earned a Bachelor of Arts degree from Mills College, where she studied art history and religion. She also took graduate courses at Columbia University, the Union Theological Seminary, and Whitworth University.

== Career ==
After marrying her husband, Reed lived in Montana and Washington before settling in Coeur d'Alene, Idaho. Reed founded the Coeur d’Alene’s Human Rights Education Institute and worked as an activist in the Idaho Panhandle region. In 1975, she advocated for the passage of the Local Land Use Planning Act. Reed is a founder of the Kootenai Environmental Alliance and Idaho Conservation League, along with her husband, an environmental lawyer.

In 1984, Reed was elected to the Idaho Senate. Representing the 4th district, Reed served for 12 years before her retirement.

== Personal life ==
Reed has two children, including political advisor Bruce Reed.
