= Julia Reed (political operative) =

American public official (born 1990)

Julia S. Reed

Deputy Director of Oval Office Operations
- In office March 2024 – January 2025
- President: Joe Biden
- Director: Richard Ruffner
- Preceded by: Ashley Williams
- Succeeded by: Chamberlain Harris

Confidential Aide to the President
- In office September 2022 – March 2024
- President: Joe Biden
- Preceded by: Ashley Williams
- Succeeded by: Drew Rodriguez

Personal details
- Born: Julia S. Reed
- Party: Democratic
- Relations: Mary Lou Reed (grandmother)
- Parent(s): Bruce Reed; Bonnie LePard

Julia S. Reed was the personal secretary to U.S. president Joe Biden.

== Early life, education and career ==
Reed taught at a middle school on the South Side of Chicago and served in the Teach for America program.

== Political career ==
Reed worked on the advance team on the Biden presidential campaign. Reed served as a coordinator in the Oval Office before becoming Biden's confidential secretary and later deputy director of Oval Office Operations.

== Personal life ==
Reed is the daughter of Bruce Reed, White House Deputy Chief of Staff for Policy, and the granddaughter of Mary Lou Reed, a former member of the Idaho State Senate.
