= Maneuver Support Vessel (Light) =

United States Army watercraft for carrying vehicles

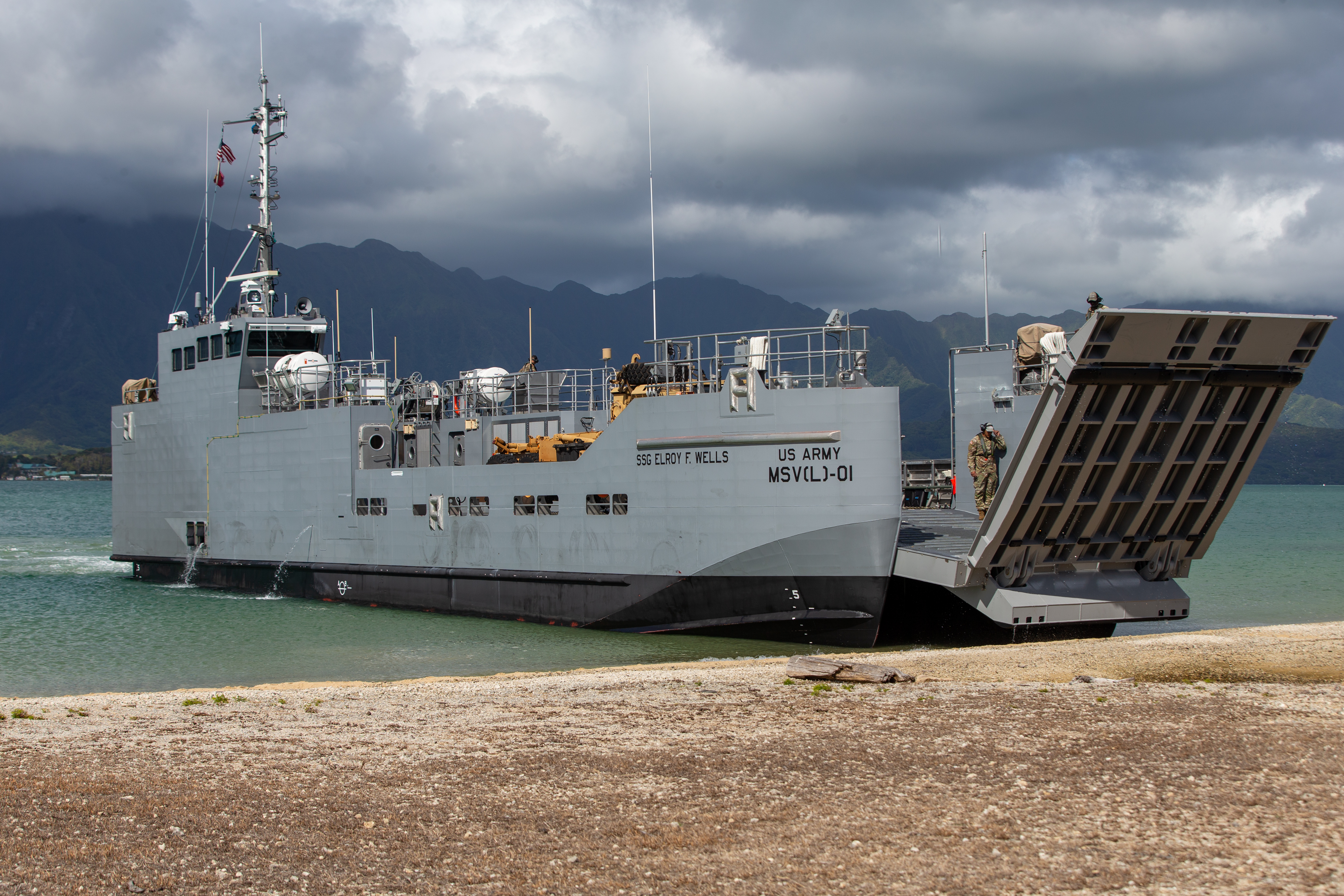
The USAV SSG Elroy F. Wells in 2025

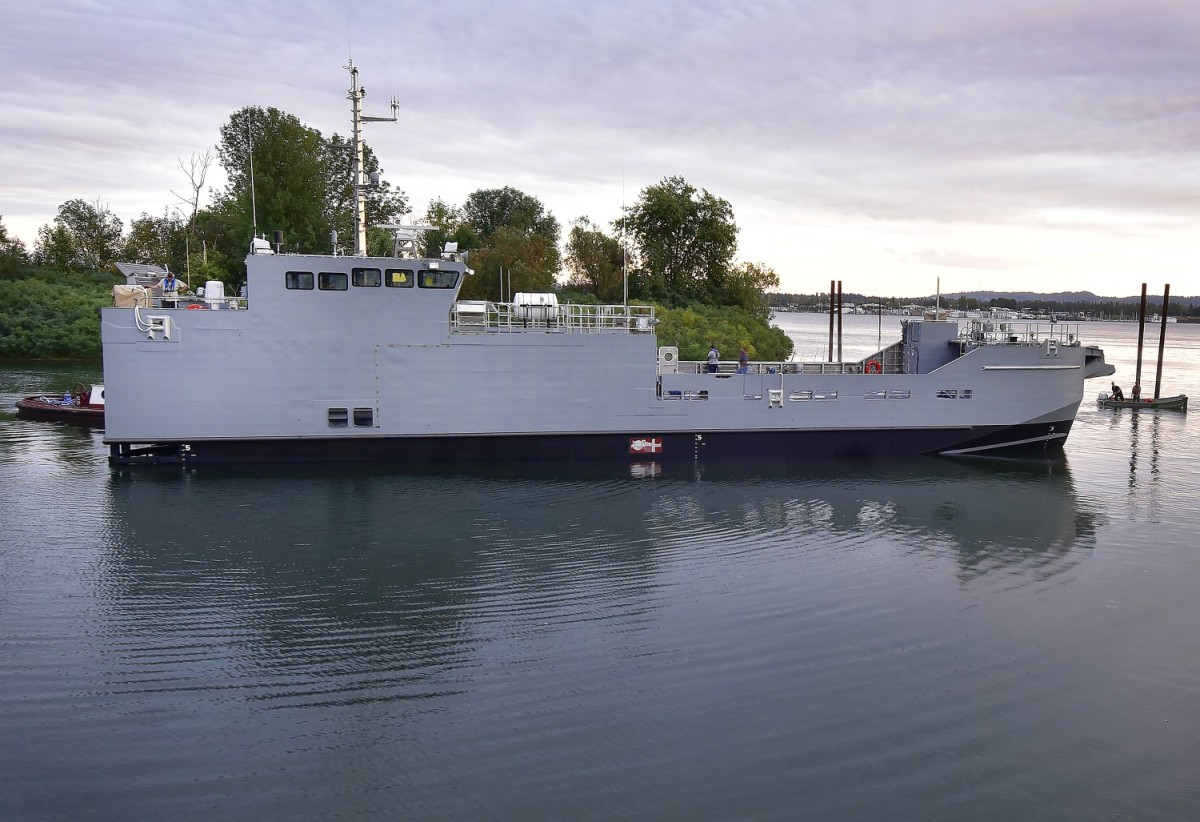
The SSG Elroy F. Wells in 2022

Maneuver Support Vessel (Light) or MSV(L) is the US Army's replacement for the Vietnam-era Landing Craft Mechanized 8 (LCM-8 or “Mike Boat”) that had been in service since 1959.

== Characteristics ==
- Length: 117 feet (36 m)
- Top speed: 30 knots (56 km/h)
- Range: 360 nautical miles (670 km)

The MSV(L) will be able to carry either one M1A2 Abrams tank, two Stryker armored vehicles with slat armor, or four Joint Light Tactical Vehicles with trailers.

== Contract ==
In September 2017, the U.S. Army Contracting Command entered into a contract with Vigor Industrial to produce the MSV(L) at its facility in Vancouver, Washington. It is a firm fix-price contract for US$979,794,011 with an estimated completion date in 2027.

It was initially planned that a prototype would be available in FY2019, then four in FY21 and FY22. Assuming full production is authorized, 32 will be built between FY23–27, for a total purchase of 36 MSV(L). The first MSV(L) prototype was launched in October 2022 at Vigor Industrial's marine fabrication facility in Vancouver.

Vigor began low-rate initial production work in June 2024. 180 skilled workers were designated to work on this program for five years.

== Ships in class ==
Name	Hull no.	Laid down	Launched	Commissioned	Home Port	Status
SSG Elroy F. Wells		17 September 2019	October 2022			Fitting Out
Craney Island	MSV(L)-02					Fitting Out
