= USAV SSG Elroy F. Wells =

USAV SSG Elroy F Wells

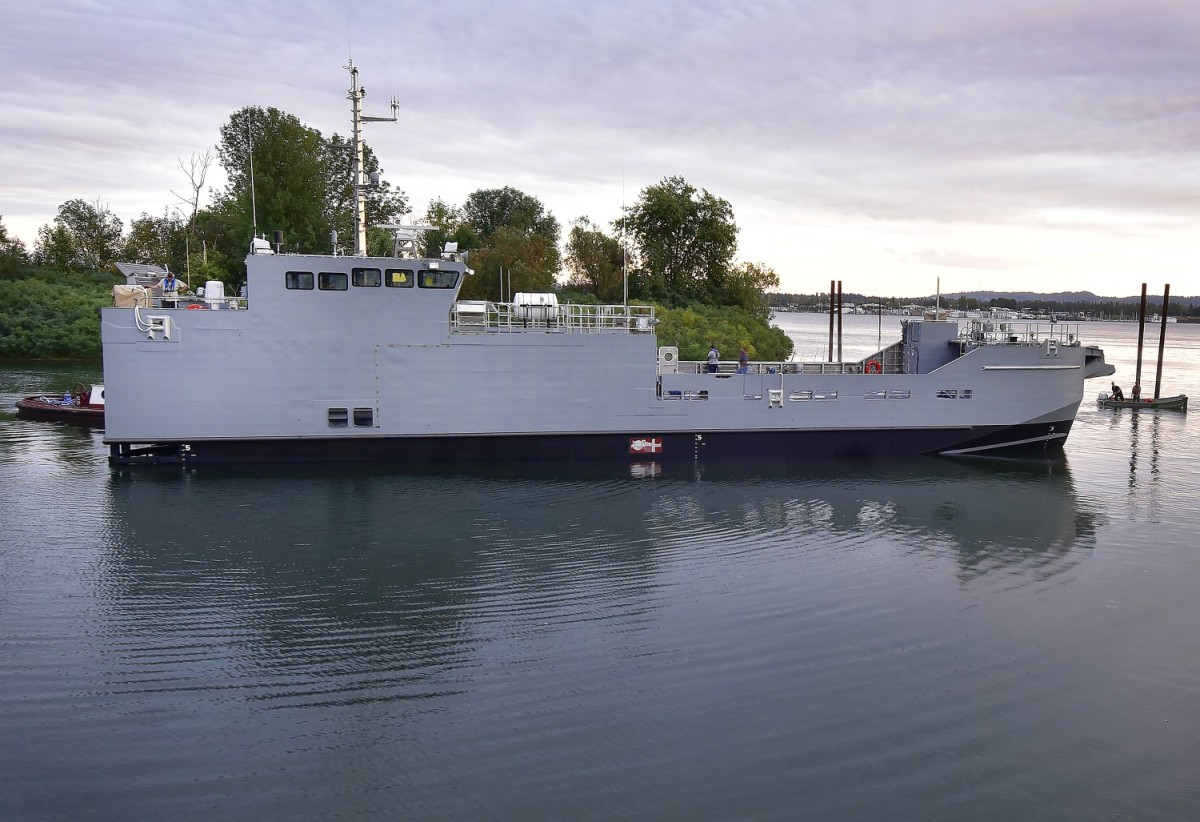

History

United States
- Name: SSG Elroy F Wells
- Namesake: Elroy Frederick Wells
- Ordered: October 2017
- Builder: Vigor Industrial
- Laid down: 16 September 2019
- Launched: October 2022
- Identification: MMSI number: 367206000; Callsign: AAIC; Hull number:
- Status: Active

General characteristics
- Class & type: Maneuver Support Vessel (Light)
- Length: 117 ft (35.7 m)
- Beam: 28 ft (8.5 m)
- Draft: 3.6 ft (1.1 m)
- Installed power: 3 × 2,600 hp (1,900 kW)
- Propulsion: Marine Jet Power waterjets
- Speed: 30 knots (56 km/h; 35 mph) max
- Range: 360 nmi (670 km; 410 mi)
- Complement: 8

USAV SSG Elroy F. Wells, named for United States Army SSGT Elroy Frederick Wells (1932–1970), is the lead ship of the Maneuver Support Vessel (Light) landing craft. She was laid down by Vigor Industrial in Vancouver, Washington, on 16 September 2019 and launched in October 2022.

== History ==
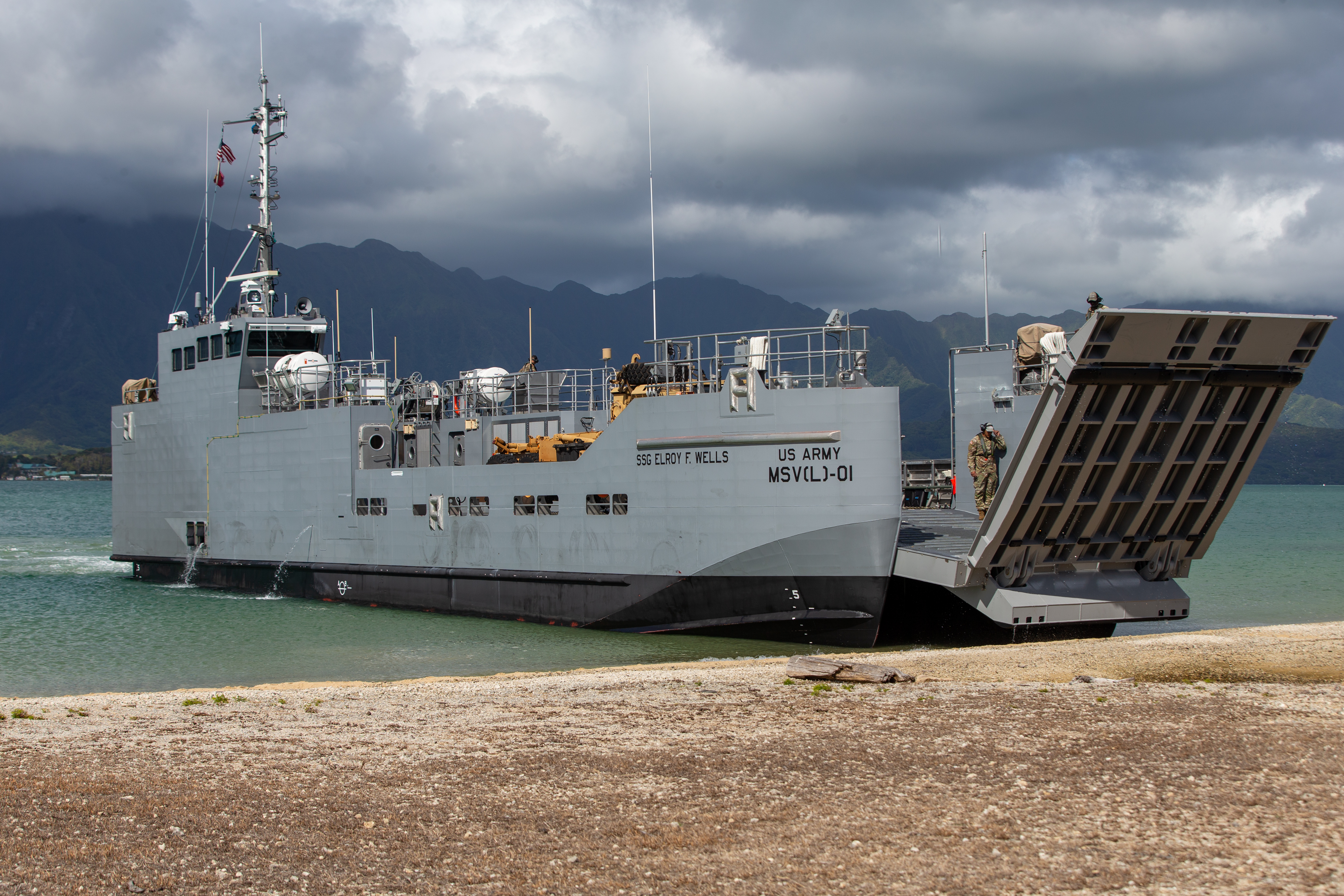
The SSG Elroy F. Wells on Marine Corps Base Hawaii, Sept. 17, 2025.

USAV SSG Elroy F. Wells's keel was laid down on 16 September 2019 by Vigor Industrial in Vancouver, Washington. In attendance was Jaime Herrera Beutler from Washington's 3rd congressional district and Vancouver mayor Anne McEnerny-Ogle. The United States Army was represented by Timothy Goddette, U.S. Army Program Executive Office, and Colonel Jered P. Helwig, Chief of Transportation of the United States Army.
