= President's Management Advisory Board =

The President's Management Advisory Board is or was a council of 17 corporate executives from leading American companies. Its purpose was to provide the administration of the executive branch advice and recommendations on effective strategies for the implementation of the best business practices on matters related to federal government's management and operations, with focus on productivity, the implementation of innovative methods, customer service, and technology. The board will be chaired by former Sirius/XM Satellite Radio Director Jeffrey Zients as part of the General Services Administration of the Executive Office. On March 10, 2011, board appointees were announced, including Greg Brown, president and chief executive officer of Motorola Solutions, Inc.; Sam Gilliland, chairman and CEO of Sabre Holdings; Debra L. Lee, chairman and CEO of BET Networks; Shantanu Narayen, president and CEO of Adobe Systems, Inc.; and Tim Solso, chairman and CEO of Cummins, Inc.

The board was formed by Executive Order 13538 by President Barack Obama in 2010 and intended to complement the President's Management Council, the interagency management and reform group also of the Executive branch created by the Clinton Administration in 1993. The board grew out of a January 2010 White House gathering that included the founders of Craigslist, Facebook, Adobe Systems, Microsoft, J Crew, Rosetta Stone, and Yelp! who were invited by Obama to share their tips on making the government more customer-friendly. The Board may have been abolished during 2017, and some functions were apparently moved to the Trump administration's new Office of American Innovation.
