= Pulsant =

- Type: Private
- Industry: Edge infrastructure provider
- Founded: 1996 (as edNET)
- Headquarters: Maidenhead, Maidenhead, England, United Kingdom
- Key people: Rob Coupland, Brad Petzer, Ben Cranham, Mark Lewis, April Clark, Jon Arnold, Victoria Mercer
- Brands: Pulsant Cloud
- Services: Internet services
- Number of employees: 400
- Subsidiaries: Onyx Group Limited, ScoLocate Limited, LayerV Ltd, Pulsant Intermediate Limited, DediPower Managed Hosting Ltd.
- Website: www.pulsant.com

Pulsant is a digital edge infrastructure provider, specialising in cloud, colocation and connectivity services.

== History ==
Established in 1995 as EdNET, an ISP, the company was rebranded as Lumison in 2004. Lumison was acquired by Bridgepoint Development Capital in 2010 and Pulsant was formed in 2011, following the integration of Lumison, a managed service provider; Dedipower, a managed hosting company; and Bluesquare Data, a datacentre operator. Pulsant acquired Scottish-based colocation company ScoLocate in 2012.

Antin Infrastructure Partners Acquire Pulsant from Oak Hill Capital and Scottish Equity Partners in 2021. Previously the company was refinanced by Oak Hill Capital from 2014 - 2021. In 2015 Pulsant acquired the consulting arm of Spinnaker Red, and in 2016 acquired IT infrastructure services company Onyx.

Pulsant announced in mid 2017 that it completed the acquisition of LayerV, a specialist public cloud solution integration company, with a strong focus on compliance, security and cloud automation.

== Data Centre locations ==
Pulsant owns several data centres across multiple locations throughout the UK. These include three sites in Scotland, Edinburgh, South Gyle, Bankhead Medway and Newbridge, as well as nine in England; Sheffield, Manchester, Newcastle x 2, Maidenhead, South London, Milton Keynes and Reading x 2.

The company occupies space in facilities in New York, Dallas, Boston, Amsterdam, Hong Kong and Frankfurt.

Pulsant's South Gyle facility in Edinburgh hosts IXScotland, Scotland's first dedicated internet exchange.

== Royal Warrant ==
Pulsant were Royal Warrant holders to the British Royal Household as a provider of hosted IT and datacentre services from 2013 - 2022.

== Accreditations ==
Pulsant is certified to ISO/IEC 27001, ISO 14001 and ISO 9001 across 10 data centres. Recently acquired Reading South and Manchester will be accredited to the same level in Q1 2023. Pulsant also holds a level 1 PCI-DSS validation for physical security at three of its sites.

In 2013 Pulsant was awarded CSA Star certification for cloud security by the British Standards Institution (BSI Group).

== See also ==
- Cloud computing
- Colocation centre
- Datacenter
- Internet exchange
- List of Internet exchange points
