= Bruce Reed (political operative) =

American political advisor (born 1960)

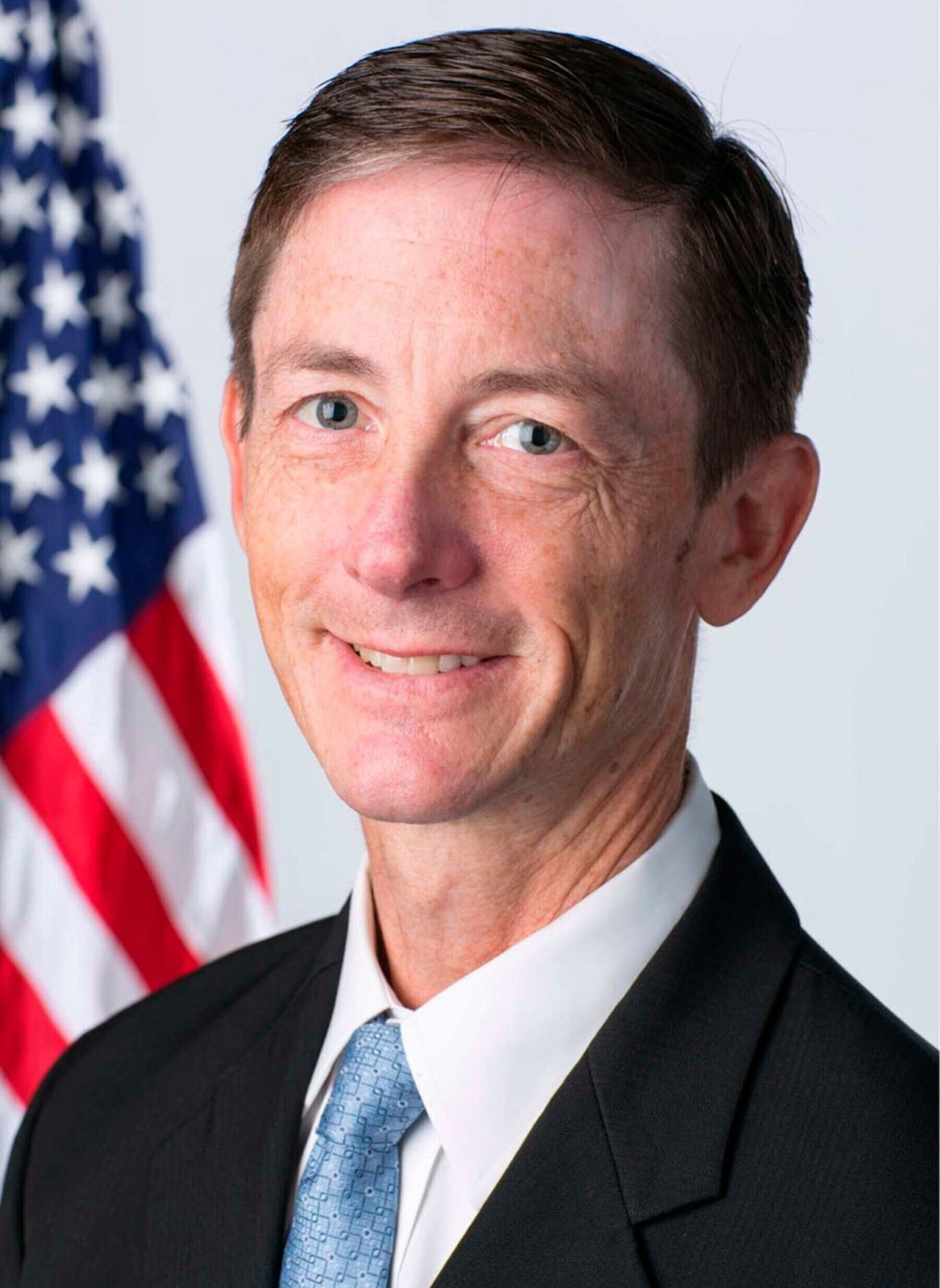
- Official portrait, 2013

White House Deputy Chief of Staff for Policy
- In office January 20, 2021 – January 20, 2025 Serving with Annie Tomasini (Note: Succeeded Jen O'Malley Dillon who served from January 20, 2021 to February 8, 2024.) and Natalie Quillian
- President: Joe Biden
- Chief of Staff: Ron Klain; Jeff Zients
- Preceded by: Chris Liddell
- Succeeded by: Stephen Miller

Chief of Staff to the Vice President
- In office January 14, 2011 – December 1, 2013
- Vice President: Joe Biden
- Preceded by: Ron Klain
- Succeeded by: Steve Ricchetti

14th Director of the Domestic Policy Council
- In office December 20, 1996 – January 20, 2001
- President: Bill Clinton
- Preceded by: Carol Rasco
- Succeeded by: John Bridgeland

Personal details
- Born: March 16, 1960 (age 66) Boise, Idaho, U.S.
- Party: Democratic
- Spouse: Bonnie LePard
- Children: Julia
- Relatives: Mary Lou Reed (mother)
- Education: Princeton University (BA); Lincoln College, Oxford (MPhil)

Bruce Reed (born March 16, 1960) is an American political advisor and non-profit administrator who was the president of the Broad Foundation. Prior to assuming that role in December 2013, he served as Chief of Staff to U.S. Vice President Joe Biden and as CEO of the Democratic Leadership Council (DLC). On December 22, 2020, it was announced that Reed would serve as a White House deputy chief of staff in the Biden administration, along with Jen O'Malley Dillon.

== Early life and education ==
Reed was born in Boise, Idaho and raised in Coeur d'Alene, Idaho, the son of former state senator Mary Lou Reed (née Case) and Scott Reed. After graduating from Coeur d'Alene High School, he earned a Bachelor of Arts degree from Princeton University in 1982 and completed a 92-page long senior thesis titled "Dickens, Decency, and Discontent: George Orwell and the Literature of Generous Anger". He then earned a master's degree in English Literature from Lincoln College, Oxford, as a Rhodes Scholar.

== Career ==
Reed served as chief speechwriter for Tennessee Senator Al Gore from 1985 to 1989. He was founding editor of the DLC magazine, The New Democrat and served as policy director of the DLC from 1990 to 1991 under DLC Chairman and Governor of Arkansas Bill Clinton. In 1992, he was deputy campaign manager for policy of the Clinton-Gore presidential campaign. During the Clinton presidency, Reed served as chief domestic policy advisor and director of the Domestic Policy Council. Reed oversaw the administration's criminal justice policy, and worked closely with Joe Biden to pass "tough-on-crime" legislation including the 1994 Crime Bill. Reed also helped to write the 1996 welfare reform law known as the Personal Responsibility and Work Opportunity Act. He is credited with coining the welfare reform catchphrase, "end welfare as we know it."

In 2006, Reed published his book The Plan: Big Ideas for America, co-written by Rahm Emanuel. A review of the book in Foreign Affairs notes "the most important big idea in the book is that Democrats should stop defending the New Deal and instead concentrate on recasting it for a more mobile society."

Reed is the author of the taunt, "change you can Xerox," from the February 21, 2008, presidential primary debate in Austin, Texas. Reed supplied Senator Hillary Clinton with the phrase to invoke accusations of plagiarism against rival Senator Barack Obama while parodying his campaign slogan: "Change you can believe in."

In the spring of 2010, Reed took a leave of absence from the DLC to become executive director and president of the National Commission on Fiscal Responsibility and Reform, a commission tasked with balancing the national budget during the Great Recession.

On January 14, 2011, he was named Chief of Staff to Vice President Joe Biden, succeeding Ron Klain. In November 2013, it was announced that he would step down as chief of staff to become president of the Broad Foundation.

During the 2020 United States presidential election, Reed worked as a technology policy advisor on Biden's presidential campaign.

Shortly after Biden's victory, Reed was reportedly under consideration to serve as director of the Office of Management and Budget. This sparked backlash from liberal critics who questioned his views on government spending. On December 22, 2020, it was announced that Reed would serve as a White House deputy chief of staff in the Biden administration, along with Jen O'Malley Dillon.

== Selected works ==
- Emanuel, Rahm; Reed, Bruce (2006). The Plan: Big Ideas for America. PublicAffairs. ISBN 978-1-58648-412-5.

Political offices
Preceded by Carol Rasco	Director of the Domestic Policy Council; 1996–2001	Succeeded by John Bridgeland
Preceded by Ron Klain	Chief of Staff to the Vice President; 2011–2013	Succeeded by Steve Ricchetti
Preceded by John Fleming	White House Deputy Chief of Staff; 2021–2025; Served alongside: Jen O'Malley Dillon & Natalie Quillian	Succeeded by Stephen Miller
