= Tom McMahon (footballer, born 1907) =

Australian rules footballer

Personal information
- Full name: Thomas Michael McMahon
- Born: 29 December 1907; Eaglehawk, Victoria
- Died: 11 December 1975 (aged 67); Ringwood East, Victoria

Playing career^{1}
Years	Club	Games (Goals)
1927, 1930–31	South Melbourne	18 (5)
1932	Melbourne	2 (0)
Total		20 (5)
- ^{1} Playing statistics correct to the end of 1932.

Thomas Michael McMahon (29 December 1907 – 11 December 1975) was an Australian rules footballer who played with South Melbourne and Melbourne in the Victorian Football League (VFL).

He later served in the Australian Army in World War II.
