= PSA Healthcare =

PSA Healthcare. is a Delaware Corporation headquartered in Atlanta, Georgia, that originated as a respiratory therapy company but now provides comprehensive home health care services. PSA provides comprehensive pediatric home health care services through a network of branch offices throughout the United States.

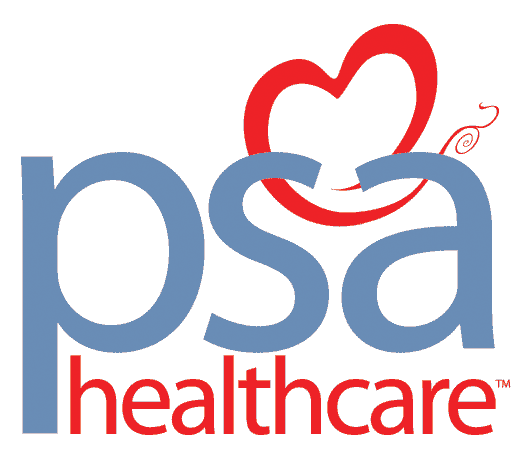

== Services ==
- Pediatric Private Duty Nursing
- Adult Private Duty Nursing (PDN)
- Aide Services
- Pediatric Day Treatment Centers for Medically Fragile Children (PPEC)

== Company history ==
In 2006, PSA Healthcare acquired Melmedica Children's Healthcare and expanded in the midwest. The company was acquired by Portfolio Logic, LLC, an investment firm primarily focused on pediatric healthcare and business in 2007. In 2015, PSA Healthcare was acquired by J.H. Whitney Capital Partners, LLC a leading middle-market private equity firm.
