= Vicinity Energy =

American energy company

Vicinity Energy is a district energy provider in the United States. Headquartered in Boston, it is a subsidiary of Antin Infrastructure Partners. It launched at the beginning of 2020 on Antin's purchase of Veolia's U.S. district energy assets in 11 cities for $1.25 billion, and has acquired further systems since.

== Divisions ==
Vicinity Energy's systems include:

- The 163MW Grays Ferry co-generation plant in Philadelphia, serving over 70 million square feet of building space, including Walnut Street Theatre.
- The district energy plant in Tulsa, Oklahoma serving 7 million square feet of building space in Downtown Tulsa.
- The district energy system in Oklahoma City, serving 9.9 million square feet of building space.
- The 200MW Kendall Cogeneration Station serving 70 million square feet of building space.
- The district energy facility in Kansas City, Missouri, serving 11 million square feet of building space.
- The Kent County waste-to-energy facility and district energy system in Grand Rapids, serving 10 million square feet of building space.
- The Baltimore district energy system, serving over 30 million square feet of building space, including Walters Art Museum and Mercy Medical Center.
- The Atlantic Station chilled water system, serving 4.7 million square feet of building space in Atlanta.
- The Trenton district energy system, serving 12 million square feet of building space.

Later acquisitions:

- Vicinity also owns and operates Washington D.C.'s the Watergate complex's Watergate Energy Collaborative Utility system, which was acquired in June 2020.
- In Morgantown, West Virginia, Vicinity owns and operates West Virginia University's district steam system, acquired in July 2020.

== Decarbonization ==
In April 2022, The Boston Globe reported Vicinity was launching eSteam™, a first-of-its-kind innovation in the United States designed to rapidly decarbonize the highest source of emissions in commercial buildings. The company became the first in the U.S. to electrify its operations, offering renewable thermal energy by installing electric boilers, industrial-scale heat pumps, and thermal storage at its central facilities starting in Boston and Cambridge, with its other facilities around the country to follow. The company is committed to reaching net zero carbon emissions across all of its operations by 2050 or sooner.

In April, 2023, Vicinity Energy and announced a partnership with the Augsburg, Germany-based organization MAN Energy Solutions to collaborate in developing low-temperature source heat pump systems for steam generation. Vicinity plans to install an industrial-scale heat pump complex at its Cambridge facility, and once installed, it will be powered by renewable electricity to harvest energy from the Charles River safely and efficiently, returning it to a lower temperature so as not to harm the river’s environment.

In November 2023, Vicinity announced the arrival of a 42MW industrial-scale electric boiler at the Kendall Square facility in Cambridge. The electrode boiler was provided by Precision Boilers (Thermon). After passing a factory acceptance test, the boiler was delivered to our Kendall facility to be prepared for installation. Once operational, the boiler will enable the immediate production of eSteam™, Vicinity’s award-winning carbon-free thermal energy product

== Management ==
- Kevin Hagerty, CEO and President
- Rob Arendell, General Counsel
- Pamela Clark, Chief Commercial Officer
- Bill Fahey, Chief Operations Officer
- Ryan Gerlach, Senior Vice President, Human Resources
- John Gibson, Chief Technical Officer
- Brian Mueller, Chief Development Officer
- Matt O'Malley, Chief Sustainability Officer
- Kevin Walsh, Chief Financial Officer

== History ==
- Bill DiCroce served as CEO of Vicinity Energy from 2020 to 2024. DiCroce died on April 13, 2025.
