= President's Management Council =

The President’s Management Council is an executive branch reform group in the United States. Although established by the Administration of President Bill Clinton in 1993, the concept for this council, and its purpose, has existed in various forms since the Reagan administration. The group is made up of high-ranking administrative officials and tasked with improving management within the Executive Office, resolving specific interagency management issues and produce mechanisms for the efficient exchange of information throughout the executive branch. Members to the council include the Chief Operating Officers from all federal executive departments (minus the Department of Homeland Security), the Deputy Director for Management of the Office of Management and Budget, Director of the Office of Personnel Management, Administrator of General Services Administration, the Chief Operating Officers of three other Executive branch agencies designated by the Chairperson, Secretary of the Cabinet, as well as officials of the Executive departments and agencies as designated by the President.

The Management Council has since been adopted by both the Bush and Obama Administrations. In July, 2001, President George W. Bush issued a memorandum establishing the council, tasked with improving overall executive branch management and coordinating management-related efforts to improve government. In 2010, President Barack Obama signed Executive Order 13538 to create the Management Council's private-sector counterpart- the President's Management Advisory Board, consisting of executive officers and chairpersons in American industry.
