= Tom McMahon (Democratic operative) =

American political operative

Tom McMahon is an American political operative.

McMahon served as executive director of the Democratic National Committee from 2005 until 2009. During his tenure, McMahon was involved in several high-profile decisions and controversies including: conflicts over 2008 Democratic presidential primary debate scheduling and over prominent Democratic complaints about the content of ABC's Path to 9/11 television program.

McMahon was a key player in, and defender of, the DNC's creation of its initially controversial "50 state strategy". The plan was eventually credited with helping to secure Democratic elections victories in 2006 at both the state and local level.

In 2016 he returned to working with the DNC as a consultant to the presidential transition team and in 2018 he worked with Milwaukee on their bid to host the 2020 Democratic National Convention.
