= Antin Infrastructure Partners =

French private equity firm

- Company type: Société Anonyme
- Traded as: Euronext Paris: ANTIN; CAC All-Share
- Industry: Private equity
- Founded: 2007
- Headquarters: Paris, France
- Key people: Alain Rauscher (CEO); Melanie Biessy (COO)
- AUM: €30.6 billion (December 2022)
- Website: www.antin-ip.com

Antin Infrastructure Partners is a French private equity firm with offices in Paris, London, New York, Luxembourg and Singapore. It has EUR 30.6 billion in assets under management as of December 2022. Antin invests in the energy & environment, digital technology, transportation, and social infrastructure sectors.

== History ==
Antin was founded in Paris in 2007. Initially sponsored by BNP Paribas, the company bought out the bank's 40 per cent stake in 2012. Led by former banker Alain Rauscher, Antin manages four funds for infrastructure investment in Europe and North America, each with a focus on Energy & Environment, Digital technology, Transportation, and Social infrastructure sectors. The company owned one third of all rolling stock in the UK in 2014. By late 2022, Antin had more than 190 partners and employees.

In 2021, Antin became a publicly traded company after listing in an IPO on Euronext Paris.

Antin sponsors a research chair in private equity and infrastructure at HEC Paris, which in 2019 was held by Denis Gromb, who has been Professor at the Finance Department. The firm also finances the chair of infrastructure finance at Italian Bocconi University. The chair is currently held by Stefano Gatti.

== Investments ==
In August 2011, Antin invested in the Spanish Andasol 1 and 2 solar power plants. After a 7 per cent tax on electricity production was imposed by the Spanish government in 2013, Antin sued the Spanish State. The Court of Arbitration of the World Bank acknowledged a compensation of €112 million to Antin. Eventually, Antin sold off the Andasol 1 and 2 power plants in 2017.

In September 2014 it was announced that the Israeli conglomerate Delek Group was selling UK freeway services company Roadchef to Antin for £153 million.

In September 2014 Antin bought UK motorway services company Roadchef for £153 million.

Between 2014 and 2015, Antin acquired a 99 per cent stake in Central Area Transmission System, a natural gas transmission and processing system, from BG Group.

In 2015, Antin acquired Amedes, a German company active in the sector of laboratory and health services.

In 2017, Antin bought 60 per cent of the capital of the French clinic group Almaviva Santé from Gimv and UI Gestion.

Since 2018, Antin has bought 82 per cent of Norwegian shipping company Sølvtrans.

In May 2018, Antin acquired Idex.

Antin invested in UK telecoms company CityFibre in 2018.

In August 2019, Antin sold a minority stake in Eurofiber, a Dutch fiber-optic network, to PGGM, after having bought the company for 875 million Euros in 2015.

In late 2019, Antin acquired the U.S. district energy assets of Veolia to establish Vicinity Energy.

In late 2020, Antin acquired Babilou, a French nursery operator. In 2021, it acquired Pulsant, a provider of datacenter services.

In 2022, CityFibre secured £4.9 billion in debt finance from banks and investors, among them Antin.

In June 2024, Shepherd Building Group sold its Portakabin business to Antin for over £1.5bn.

== Controversies ==
In January 2023, a social infrastructure provider owned by Antin - The Hesley Group - was the subject of an investigation by BBC News. BBC News reported that children in care were punched, locked out naked, and had vinegar poured on cuts. The complaints were raised 3 years prior to the closure of the children's home. The BBC commissioned research that found more than a quarter of all children's home placements in England and Wales were run by private equity firms, and criticised the alleged lack of accountability in the sector. Hesley was put up for sale in 2023.
