= Remember the First Ladies =

2024 book

Remember the First Ladies: The Legacies of America’s History-Making Women
- Author: Diana B. Carlin, Anita B. McBride, and Nancy Kegan Smith
- Language: English
- Genre: Non-fiction
- Publisher: Cognella Academic Publishing
- Publication date: 2024
- Pages: 562
- ISBN: 979-8-8233-4667-2

Remember the First Ladies: The Legacies of America's History-Making Women is a 2024 book by Diana B. Carlin, Anita B. McBride, and Nancy Kegan Smith that examines the evolving role of the First Ladies of the United States in American history. It explores their contributions to societal and political issues through thematic chapters highlighting figures such as Eleanor Roosevelt, Lady Bird Johnson, Betty Ford, and Michelle Obama.

== Contents ==
Remember the First Ladies is a book co-authored by Diana B. Carlin, Anita B. McBride, and Nancy Kegan Smith, published in January 2024 by Cognella Academic Publishing. This book is a more accessible version of the authors' previous textbook, designed for general readership. It explores the evolving role of the First Ladies of the United States in American history and their impacts on society.

The book examines themes associated with individual First Ladies. These include Eleanor Roosevelt's advocacy for human rights, Lady Bird Johnson's environmental initiatives, Betty Ford's support for the Equal Rights Amendment, and Michelle Obama's use of social media to promote her causes, such as combating childhood obesity. The title is derived from Abigail Adams’ famous plea to her husband, John Adams, to "remember the ladies" during the drafting of the U.S. Constitution.

The text covers how the responsibilities of First Ladies vary due to the lack of a constitutional definition for the role. It notes that the influence of First Ladies often depends on their individual interests and their husbands' support. For instance, Martha Washington established precedents for the position by assisting in ceremonial duties.

== Reception ==
The book received attention for its comprehensive approach to documenting the lives and contributions of First Ladies. It was praised for its collaboration among the three authors, who brought diverse expertise. Diana Carlin, a retired professor, previously taught courses on First Ladies. Nancy Kegan Smith contributed experience from her role as the director of the Presidential Materials Division at the National Archives and Records Administration. Anita McBride, a former chief of staff to Laura Bush, offered insight from her firsthand experiences in the White House.

The Washingtonian noted that the book chronicles shifts in the role of First Ladies from Martha Washington to contemporary figures like Jill Biden, providing a broad historical context. The outlet compared it favorably to other works on the subject, noting its focus on the entire historical span of First Ladies rather than just recent occupants of the role.

Reviewers highlighted the book's emphasis on themes such as the lack of a rulebook for the position and the balance between personal interests and public expectations. The adaptability of the role was a recurring focus, with the authors citing examples of how First Ladies have influenced policy and public opinion through non-traditional means.

The collaborative nature of the project, combined with its aim to reach a wider audience, was frequently emphasized in coverage of the book's release. Observers noted that it seeks to fill gaps in public understanding of First Ladies and their historical contributions.
