= Maggie Williams =

American political consultant (born 1954)

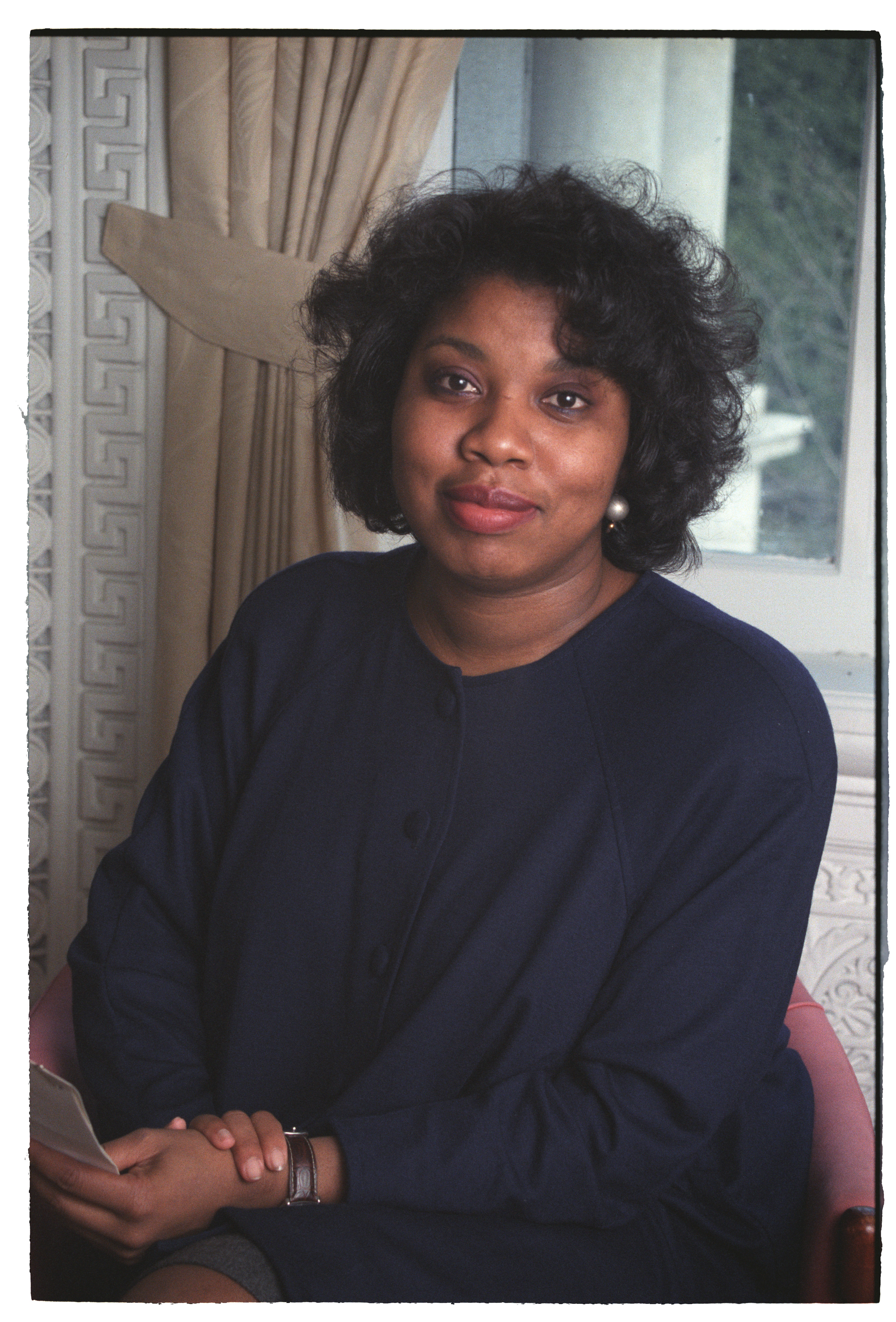

Chief of Staff to the First Lady of the United States
- In office January 20, 1993 – May 31, 1997
- President: Bill Clinton
- First Lady: Hillary Clinton
- Preceded by: Susan Porter Rose
- Succeeded by: Melanne Verveer

Personal details
- Born: Margaret Ann Williams; December 25, 1954 (age 71) Kansas City, Missouri, U.S.
- Party: Democratic
- Spouse: Bill Barrett
- Education: Trinity Washington University (BA); University of Pennsylvania (MA)

Margaret Ann Williams (born December 25, 1954) is a former director of the Institute of Politics at Harvard University and is a partner in Griffin Williams, a management-consulting firm.

She was the campaign manager for Hillary Clinton's 2008 presidential campaign. Following Clinton's win in the New Hampshire primary in January 2008, Williams was brought onto the Clinton campaign staff as a senior adviser. On February 10, 2008, she replaced Patti Solis Doyle as the campaign's manager.

== Early life and education ==
Williams was born in Kansas City, Missouri. She attended high school at Notre Dame de Sion in Kansas City, Missouri. She earned her B.A. in Political Science from Trinity College (Washington D.C.) in 1977, and was awarded an honorary doctorate in 2009. Williams also received a master's degree from the Annenberg School for Communication at the University of Pennsylvania in 1992.

== Career ==
Williams was an aide to Representative Morris K. Udall, Democrat of Arizona from 1977 to 1978, Press Secretary for the Democratic National Committee in 1979, manager of the Press office of the D.N.C. convention in 1980, campaign press secretary for Representative Robert G. Torricelli, Democrat of New Jersey in 1982.

She was director of media relations for the Center on Budget and Policy Priorities in 1983, a member of the convention staff of the D.N.C. in 1984 and communications director for the Children's Defense Fund, 1984–1990.

=== White House years ===
While at the Children's Defense Fund she met, and became friends with then First Lady of Arkansas Hillary Clinton. She served as Clinton's transition director in 1992 and as her chief of staff during her first term as First Lady of the United States (1993–1997), the first African American woman to hold that position and the first Chief of Staff to the First Lady who also served as an Assistant to the President.

As stated in Taylor Branch's The Clinton Tapes, in 1994, President Clinton turned to Williams "to compile confidential suggestions" on personnel shifts ... According to Branch, "When I asked how unusual it was for the first lady's office to be involved, he replied there was no easy blueprint for reorganizing the organizers. Williams was shrewd, discreet, and efficient."

In a profile in Essence Magazine Ana Perez, who during George Bush's administration was the first Black person to serve as a press secretary to a First Lady said of Williams: "I am in awe of her...I have so much respect for her because she has this absolutely calm center and because she is a good and decent person. She's a do-gooder in every sense of the word." She has been described as having "very good judgment on issues and people" by Leon Panetta.

On the night of the death of deputy White House counsel Vince Foster in 1993, a Secret Service agent claimed he saw Williams remove two handfuls of folders from his office, which she vehemently denied.

=== Later career ===
After leaving the White House, Williams served as the President of Fenton Communications. In this position, she became the highest ranked black woman in an American top-50 public relations firm. Previously, Williams served as a communications consultant in Paris.

President Bill Clinton asked Williams to be his chief of staff at the Clinton Foundation. In June 2014, she was named Director of the Institute of Politics at Harvard Kennedy School at Harvard University.

==== 2008 presidential campaign ====
Williams became the campaign manager for Hillary Clinton's 2008 presidential campaign after being brought on as a senior adviser following Clinton's win in the New Hampshire primary in January 2008. On February 10, 2008, she replaced Patti Solis Doyle as the campaign's manager. and infused Clinton's campaign "with a sense of purpose" according to staffers. In this capacity she defended the Clinton campaign's decision to circulate pictures of rival candidate Barack Obama wearing traditional Somali clothing, stating, "If Barack Obama's campaign wants to suggest that a photo of him wearing traditional Somali clothing is divisive, they should be ashamed." Obama's campaign manager, David Plouffe, described this episode as "the most shameful, offensive fear-mongering we've seen from either party in this election."

In their book, The Battle for America: The Story of an Extraordinary Election, Haynes Johnson and Dan Balz wrote that with Williams in charge the campaign was more collegial and operated with greater efficiency.

==== 2016 presidential campaign ====
During Clinton's 2016 presidential campaign, Williams served on the team planning for a potential presidential transition.

== Boards and affiliations ==
In addition to her consulting business, Williams is a director of the Scholastic Publishing Corporation, the Clinton Health Access Initiative (CHAI). She is a trustee of the Rhode Island School of Design and a US Commissioner for the United Nations Educational, Scientific and Cultural Organization (UNESCO). From 2000 to 2007, Williams also served as director at Delta Financial Corporation, a mortgage lender that filed for bankruptcy in December 2007.

She serves on the Advisory Boards of the Eli J. Segal Citizenship Program at Brandeis University and the Institute of Politics (IOP) at Harvard Kennedy School at Harvard University.
