= Susan Porter Rose =

American political aide and administrator

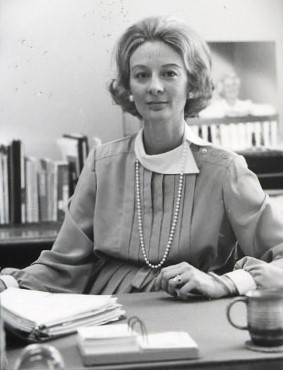
- Rose in the White House in 1982

Chief of Staff to the First Lady of the United States
- In office January 20, 1989 – January 20, 1993
- President: George H. W. Bush
- First Lady: Barbara Bush
- Preceded by: Lee L. Verstandig (1986)
- Succeeded by: Maggie Williams

Personal details
- Born: Susan Anne Porter
- Children: 1
- Education: Earlham College; Indiana State University

Susan Porter Rose is an American political aide and administrator who held roles in government, academia, and public service. She served as chief of staff to Barbara Bush from 1981 to 1993 and previously worked for First Ladies Pat Nixon and Betty Ford. Her career also included roles at the U.S. Department of Justice, as a commissioner on the U.S. Commission of Fine Arts, and as a trustee of the George H.W. Bush Presidential Library and Museum.

== Early life and education ==
Susan Porter Rose, born Susan Anne Porter, is a native of Terre Haute, Indiana. She is the daughter of Elmer Porter, a former chair of the fine arts department at Indiana State University. Rose graduated from Earlham College in 1963. She completed a M.A. at Indiana State University, completing it in 1970.

== Career ==
=== Early career ===
Rose began her career as a staff assistant to U.S. representative Richard L. Roudebush, serving from 1963 to 1964. She subsequently transitioned into academia, working as assistant dean at the George School in Bucks County, Pennsylvania, from 1964 to 1966. She then served as assistant director of admissions at Mount Holyoke College from 1966 to 1971. Her tenure spanned a turbulent time in American history, including student protests over the Cambodian Civil War and the Kent State shootings.

In 1970, Rose joined the White House staff as a volunteer during her summer vacation, assisting with correspondence for First Lady Pat Nixon. This initial role led to her permanent appointment at the White House in 1971. In 1973, she was promoted to director of scheduling for the First Lady. She worked as Pat Nixon's appointment secretary during the Watergate scandal.

Rose retained this role during the transition to the presidency of Gerald Ford, serving as director of scheduling for First Lady Betty Ford from 1974 to 1977. During this time, she worked Ford's public health campaign following her breast cancer diagnosis and substance dependency.

From 1977 to 1981, Rose worked at the U.S. Department of Justice. She served as special assistant to the U.S. Assistant Attorney General of the Office For Improvements in the Administration of Justice. In 1980, she was on the staff of the Assistant Attorney General for Administration. She was also a special assistant to the Deputy Assistant Attorney General in the Justice Management Division.

=== Chief of staff to First Lady Barbara Bush ===
In 1981, Rose became Chief of Staff to Barbara Bush, then Second Lady of the United States. She continued in this role when Bush became First Lady in 1989 and served until the end of the administration in 1993.

During the George H. W. Bush 1988 presidential campaign, Rose played a role on Barbara Bush's team, managing schedules and events. Following Bush's election, she was appointed chief of staff to the First Lady, also serving as a deputy assistant to the president. Her responsibilities included managing Mrs. Bush's East Wing staff, coordinating public events, and acting as a liaison for projects such as the Barbara Bush Foundation for Family Literacy, which she helped establish. Rose's responsibilities paralleled those of the president's staff, excluding foreign policy and legislative development.

Rose managed an office that included roles such as press secretary, event coordinator, and correspondence director. In 1990, Rose coordinated Barbara Bush's trips, including visits to Europe and the Middle East in November. She was also involved in organizing Barbara Bush's participation in the Earth Summit in Rio de Janeiro, Brazil, in June 1992. Rose designed the bookplate for Barbara Bush's publication, Millie's Book, which highlighted the First Family's dog, Millie, and included a dedication to Rose and two others.

Rose's management style, described in a Washington Post article as direct and detail-oriented. She worked long hours and mediated between Barbara Bush and external stakeholders, ensuring that decisions aligned with the First Lady's goals.

=== Later career ===
Post-administration, Rose engaged in public speaking, board memberships, and personal projects. From 1993 to 1998, she served as a commissioner on the U.S. Commission of Fine Arts. During this period, she also served on the board of directors for the Barbara Bush Foundation for Family Literacy and as a trustee for the George H.W. Bush Presidential Library and Museum, positions she held from 1993 to 2000.

== Personal life ==
Rose maintained family ties to Richmond, Indiana, where her father, Elmer Johnson Porter, contributed a collection of materials to the Morrisson-Reeves Library in the city. Her father died in 1996. She has also remained connected to her hometown of Terre Haute and to Earlham College, where she served as president of the alumni association in 1980.

On January 26, 1980, Rose married Jonathan Chapman Rose at the Washington National Cathedral. He is an attorney who worked at Jones Day and held roles in the Nixon and Reagan administrations. In 1981, at the age of 40, Rose gave birth to their only child, Benjamin, after an 18-hour labor. In 1991, The couple lived in Alexandria, Virginia. As of 1999, Rose and her family resided in McLean, Virginia.
