= List of first ladies of the United States =

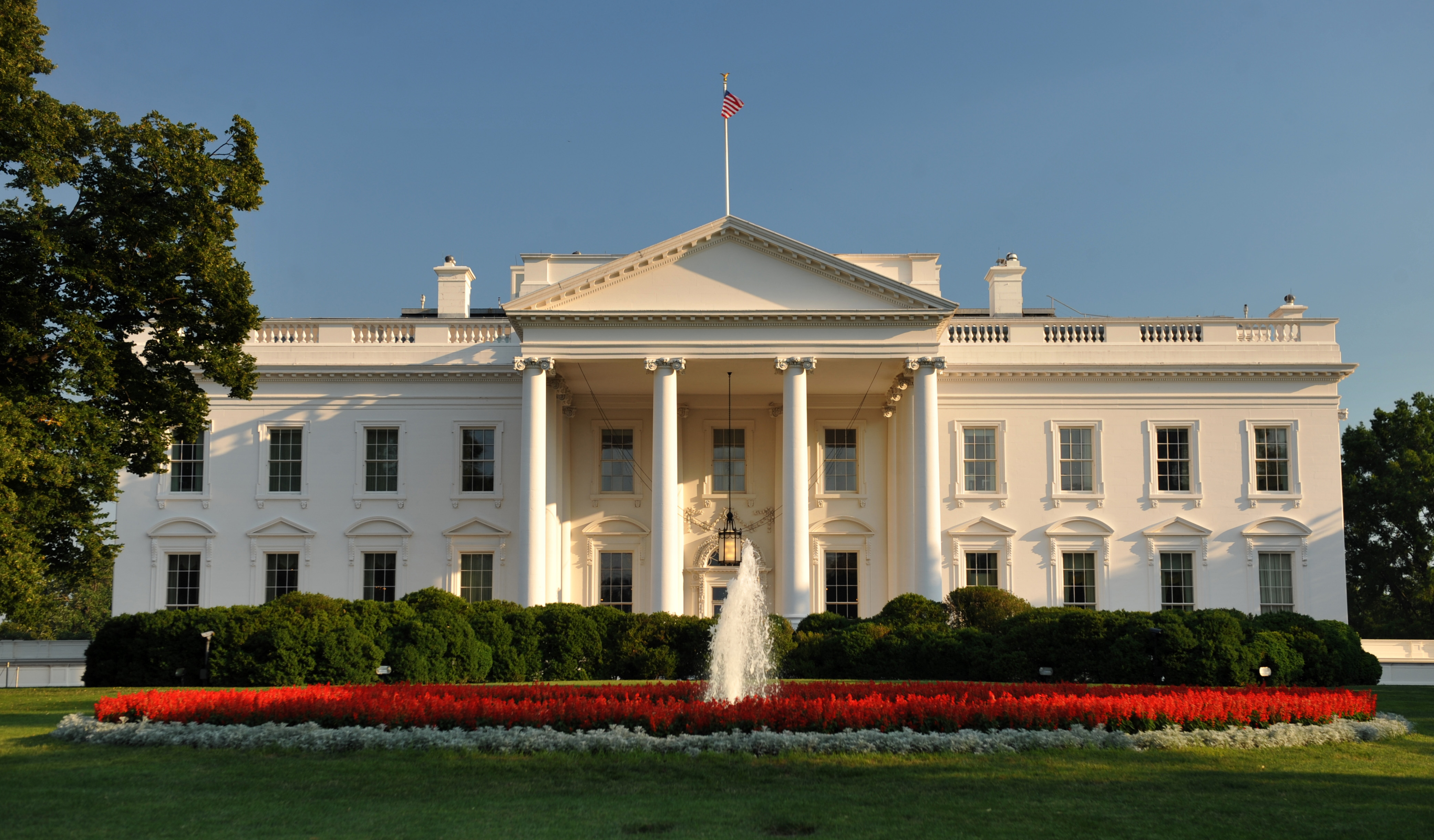
The White House, official residence of the first lady of the United States

The first lady of the United States is the hostess of the White House. The position is traditionally filled by the wife of the president of the United States, but, on occasion, the title has been applied to women who were not presidents' wives, such as when the president was a bachelor or widower, or when the wife of the president was unable to fulfill the duties of the first lady. The first lady is not an elected position; it carries no official duties and receives no salary. Nonetheless, she attends many official ceremonies and functions of state either along with or in place of the president. Traditionally, the first lady does not hold outside employment while occupying the office, although Eleanor Roosevelt earned money writing and giving lectures, but gave most of it to charity, and Jill Biden maintained her regular job as an educator during her time in the role. The first lady has her own staff, including the White House social secretary, the first lady's chief of staff, the communications director, the White House chief floral designer, and the executive chef. The Office of the First Lady is also in charge of all social and ceremonial events of the White House, and is a branch of the Executive Office of the President.

There have been total of 54 first ladies.

Following Donald Trump's inauguration on January 20, 2025, his wife, Melania Trump, became the 44th official first lady. There are four living former first ladies: Hillary Clinton; Laura Bush; Michelle Obama; and Jill Biden. The most recent first lady to die was Rosalynn Carter. The first first lady was Martha Washington. Presidents John Tyler and Woodrow Wilson had two official first ladies; both remarried during their presidential tenures. The wives of four presidents died before their husbands were sworn into office but are still considered first ladies by the White House and National First Ladies' Library: Martha Jefferson; Rachel Jackson; Hannah Van Buren; and Nell Arthur.

One woman who was not married to a president is still considered an official first lady: Harriet Lane, niece of bachelor James Buchanan. The other non-spousal relatives who served as White House hostesses are not recognized by the First Ladies' Library.

In 2007, the United States Mint began releasing a set of half-ounce $10 gold coins under the First Spouse Program with engravings of portraits of the first ladies on the obverse. When a president served without a spouse, a gold coin was issued that bears an obverse image emblematic of Liberty as depicted on a circulating coin of that era and a reverse image emblematic of themes of that president's life. This is true for the coins for Thomas Jefferson, Andrew Jackson, Martin Van Buren, and James Buchanan's first ladies, but not the coin for Chester A. Arthur's first lady, which instead depicts suffragette Alice Paul.

== List ==
This list includes all persons who served as first ladies, regardless of whether they were married to the incumbent president or not, as well as persons who are considered first ladies by the official White House website and the White House Historical Association. It is sorted by the name the first ladies were commonly known as.

POTUS No.	Portrait	Name	Tenure	Age at tenure start	President (Husband, unless noted)
1	Portrait of Martha Washington	Martha Washington; June 2, 1731 – May 22, 1802 (aged 70)	April 30, 1789 – March 4, 1797	57 years, 321 days	George Washington m. January 6, 1759
2	Portrait painting of Abigail Adams	Abigail Adams; November 22, 1744 – October 28, 1818 (aged 73)	March 4, 1797 – March 4, 1801	52 years, 102 days	John Adams m. October 25, 1764
3	Portrait painting of Martha Jefferson	Martha Randolph; September 27, 1772 – October 10, 1836 (aged 64)	March 4, 1801 – March 4, 1809	28 years, 158 days	Thomas Jefferson; Father (Note: Jefferson's spouse, Martha Jefferson, died before he became president. Their daughter, Martha, is considered first lady by the White House Historical Association.)
4	Portrait painting of Dolly Madison	Dolley Madison; May 20, 1768 – July 12, 1849 (aged 81)	March 4, 1809 – March 4, 1817	40 years, 288 days	James Madison m. September 14, 1794
5	Portrait painting of Elizabeth Monroe	Elizabeth Monroe; June 30, 1768 – September 23, 1830 (aged 62)	March 4, 1817 – March 4, 1825	48 years, 247 days	James Monroe m. February 16, 1786
6	Portrait engraving of Louisa Adams	Louisa Adams; Birth country: Great Britain (present day United Kingdom); February 12, 1775 – May 15, 1852 (aged 77)	March 4, 1825 – March 4, 1829	50 years, 20 days	John Quincy Adams m. July 26, 1797
7		Emily Donelson June 1, 1807 – December 19, 1836 (aged 29)	March 4, 1829 – November 26, 1834	21 years, 276 days	Andrew Jackson; Uncle-in-law
7		Sarah Jackson July 1805 – August 23, 1887 (aged 82)	November 26, 1834 – March 4, 1837	31 years, 133 days	Andrew Jackson; Father-in-law
8	Vacant		March 4, 1837 – November 27, 1838	Vacant	Martin Van Buren; Widower
8	Portrait painting of Angelica Singleton Van Buren	Angelica “Sarah” Van Buren; February 13, 1818 – December 29, 1877 (aged 59)	November 27, 1838 – March 4, 1841	20 years, 287 days	Martin Van Buren; Father-in-law
9	Portrait painting of Anna Tuthill Harrison	Anna Harrison; July 25, 1775 – February 25, 1864 (aged 88)	March 4, 1841 – April 4, 1841	65 years, 222 days	William Henry Harrison m. November 25, 1795
9	Portrait painting of Jane Irwin Harrison	Jane Harrison; July 23, 1804 – May 11, 1847 (aged 42)	March 4, 1841 – April 4, 1841	36 years, 224 days	William Henry Harrison; Father-in-law
10	Portrait painting of Letitia Tyler	Letitia Tyler; November 12, 1790 – September 10, 1842 (aged 51)	April 4, 1841 – September 10, 1842 †	50 years, 143 days	John Tyler m. March 29, 1813
10	Portrait painting of Priscilla Cooper Tyler	Priscilla Tyler; June 14, 1816 – December 29, 1889 (aged 73)	September 10, 1842 – June 26, 1844	26 years, 88 days	John Tyler; Father-in-law (Note: Robert and Priscilla Tyler left the White House for Philadelphia in March 1844, knowing that Julia Gardiner Tyler was set to marry the president and become the new White House hostess. President Tyler's daughter, Letitia Tyler-Semple, saw to White House social affairs until the wedding. This meant during President Tyler's one term as president, four ladies served as first lady, though two were in that role unofficially. Semple served in this role from March to June 1844.)
10	Portrait painting of Julia Tyler	Julia Tyler; May 4, 1820 – July 10, 1889 (aged 69)	June 26, 1844 – March 4, 1845	24 years, 53 days	John Tyler m. June 26, 1844; Married while president
11	Portrait painting of Sarah Polk	Sarah Polk; September 4, 1803 – August 14, 1891 (aged 87)	March 4, 1845 – March 4, 1849	41 years, 181 days	James K. Polk m. January 1, 1824
12	Portrait painting of Margaret Taylor	Margaret "Peggy" Taylor; September 21, 1788 – August 14, 1852 (aged 63)	March 4, 1849 – July 9, 1850	60 years, 164 days	Zachary Taylor m. June 21, 1810
13	Portrait painting of Abigail Fillmore	Abigail Fillmore; March 13, 1798 – March 30, 1853 (aged 55)	July 9, 1850 – March 4, 1853	52 years, 118 days	Millard Fillmore m. February 5, 1826
14	Engraving of Jane Pierce	Jane Pierce; March 12, 1806 – December 2, 1863 (aged 57)	March 4, 1853 – March 4, 1857	46 years, 357 days	Franklin Pierce m. November 19, 1834
15	Portrait photograph of Harriet Lane	Harriet Lane; May 9, 1830 – July 3, 1903 (aged 73)	March 4, 1857 – March 4, 1861	26 years, 299 days	James Buchanan; Uncle
16	Portrait photograph of Mary Lincoln	Mary Lincoln; December 13, 1818 – July 16, 1882 (aged 63)	March 4, 1861 – April 15, 1865	42 years, 81 days	Abraham Lincoln m. November 4, 1842
17	Portrait engraving of Eliza Johnson	Eliza Johnson; October 4, 1810 – January 15, 1876 (aged 65)	April 15, 1865 – March 4, 1869	54 years, 193 days	Andrew Johnson m. May 17, 1827
18	Portrait photograph of Julia Grant	Julia Grant; January 26, 1826 – December 14, 1902 (aged 76)	March 4, 1869 – March 4, 1877	43 years, 37 days	Ulysses S. Grant m. August 22, 1848
19	Portrait photograph of Lucy Hayes	Lucy Hayes; August 28, 1831 – June 25, 1889 (aged 57)	March 4, 1877 – March 4, 1881	45 years, 188 days	Rutherford B. Hayes m. December 30, 1852
20	Portrait photograph of Lucretia Garfield	Lucretia Garfield; April 19, 1832 – March 14, 1918 (aged 85)	March 4, 1881 – September 19, 1881	48 years, 319 days	James A. Garfield m. November 11, 1858
21	Portrait of Mary Arthur McElroy	Mary McElroy; July 5, 1841 – January 8, 1917 (aged 75)	September 19, 1881 – March 4, 1885	40 years, 76 days	Chester A. Arthur; Brother
22	Portrait of Rose Cleveland	Rose Cleveland; June 13, 1846 – November 22, 1918 (aged 72)	March 4, 1885 – June 2, 1886	38 years, 264 days	Grover Cleveland; Brother
22	Portrait of Frances Cleveland	Frances Cleveland; July 21, 1864 – October 29, 1947 (aged 83)	June 2, 1886 – March 4, 1889	21 years, 316 days	Grover Cleveland m. June 2, 1886; Married while president
23	Portrait of Caroline Harrison	Caroline Harrison; October 1, 1832 – October 25, 1892 (aged 60)	March 4, 1889 – October 25, 1892 †	56 years, 154 days	Benjamin Harrison m. October 20, 1853
23	Portrait of Mary Harrison McKee	Mary Harrison McKee; April 3, 1858 – October 28, 1930 (aged 72)	October 25, 1892 – March 4, 1893	34 years, 205 days	Benjamin Harrison; Father
24	Portrait of Frances Cleveland	Frances Cleveland; July 21, 1864 – October 29, 1947 (aged 83)	March 4, 1893 – March 4, 1897	28 years, 226 days	Grover Cleveland m. June 2, 1886; Remarried 1913
25	Portrait of Ida McKinley	Ida McKinley; June 8, 1847 – May 26, 1907 (aged 59)	March 4, 1897 – September 14, 1901	49 years, 269 days	William McKinley m. January 25, 1871
26	Portrait of Edith Roosevelt	Edith Roosevelt; August 6, 1861 – September 30, 1948 (aged 87)	September 14, 1901 – March 4, 1909	40 years, 39 days	Theodore Roosevelt m. December 2, 1886
27	Portrait of Helen Taft	Helen "Nellie" Taft; June 2, 1861 – May 22, 1943 (aged 81)	March 4, 1909 – March 4, 1913	47 years, 275 days	William H. Taft m. June 19, 1886
28	Portrait of Ellen Wilson	Ellen Wilson; May 15, 1860 – August 6, 1914 (aged 54)	March 4, 1913 – August 6, 1914 †	52 years, 293 days	Woodrow Wilson m. June 24, 1885
28	Portrait of Margaret Woodrow Wilson	Margaret Wilson; April 16, 1886 – February 12, 1944 (aged 57)	August 6, 1914 – December 18, 1915	28 years, 112 days	Woodrow Wilson; Father
28	Portrait of Edith Wilson	Edith Wilson; October 15, 1872 – December 28, 1961 (aged 89)	December 18, 1915 – March 4, 1921	43 years, 64 days	Woodrow Wilson m. December 18, 1915; Married while president
29	Portrait of Florence Harding	Florence Harding; August 15, 1860 – November 21, 1924 (aged 64)	March 4, 1921 – August 2, 1923	60 years, 201 days	Warren G. Harding m. July 8, 1891
30	Grace Coolidge	Grace Coolidge; January 3, 1879 – July 8, 1957 (aged 78)	August 2, 1923 – March 4, 1929	44 years, 211 days	Calvin Coolidge m. October 4, 1905
31	Portrait of Lou Hoover	Lou Hoover; March 29, 1874 – January 7, 1944 (aged 69)	March 4, 1929 – March 4, 1933	54 years, 340 days	Herbert Hoover m. February 10, 1899
32	Portrait of Eleanor Roosevelt	Eleanor Roosevelt; October 11, 1884 – November 7, 1962 (aged 78)	March 4, 1933 – April 12, 1945	48 years, 144 days	Franklin D. Roosevelt m. March 17, 1905
33	Portrait of Bess Truman	Elizabeth "Bess" Truman; February 13, 1885 – October 18, 1982 (aged 97)	April 12, 1945 – January 20, 1953	60 years, 58 days	Harry S. Truman m. June 28, 1919
34	Portrait of Mamie Eisenhower	Mary "Mamie" Eisenhower; November 14, 1896 – November 1, 1979 (aged 82)	January 20, 1953 – January 20, 1961	56 years, 67 days	Dwight D. Eisenhower m. July 1, 1916
35	Portrait Of Jaqueline Kennedy	Jacqueline "Jackie" Kennedy; July 28, 1929 – May 19, 1994 (aged 64)	January 20, 1961 – November 22, 1963	31 years, 176 days	John F. Kennedy m. September 12, 1953; Remarried 1968
36	Portrait of Lady Bird Johnson	Claudia "Lady Bird" Johnson; December 22, 1912 – July 11, 2007 (aged 94)	November 22, 1963 – January 20, 1969	50 years, 335 days	Lyndon B. Johnson m. November 17, 1934
37	Portrait of Pat Nixon	Thelma "Pat" Nixon; March 16, 1912 – June 22, 1993 (aged 81)	January 20, 1969 – August 9, 1974	56 years, 310 days	Richard Nixon m. June 21, 1940
38	Portrait of Betty Ford	Elizabeth "Betty" Ford; April 8, 1918 – July 8, 2011 (aged 93)	August 9, 1974 – January 20, 1977	56 years, 123 days	Gerald Ford m. October 15, 1948
39	Portrait of Rosalynn Carter	Rosalynn Carter; August 18, 1927 – November 19, 2023 (aged 96)	January 20, 1977 – January 20, 1981	49 years, 155 days	Jimmy Carter m. July 7, 1946
40	Portrait of Nancy Reagan	Nancy Reagan; July 6, 1921 – March 6, 2016 (aged 94)	January 20, 1981 – January 20, 1989	59 years, 203 days	Ronald Reagan m. March 4, 1952
41	Portrait of Barbara Bush	Barbara Bush; June 8, 1925 – April 17, 2018 (aged 92)	January 20, 1989 – January 20, 1993	63 years, 226 days	George H. W. Bush m. January 6, 1945
42	Portrait of Hillary Rodham Clinton	Hillary Clinton; Born October 26, 1947 (age 78)	January 20, 1993 – January 20, 2001	45 years, 86 days	Bill Clinton m. October 11, 1975
43	Portrait of Laura Bush	Laura Bush; Born November 4, 1946 (age 79)	January 20, 2001 – January 20, 2009	54 years, 77 days	George W. Bush m. November 5, 1977
44	Portrait of Michelle Obama	Michelle Obama; Born January 17, 1964 (age 62)	January 20, 2009 – January 20, 2017	45 years, 3 days	Barack Obama m. October 3, 1992
45	Photograph of Melania Trump	Melania Trump; Birth country: Yugoslavia (present day Slovenia); Born April 26, 1970 (age 56)	January 20, 2017 – January 20, 2021	46 years, 269 days	Donald Trump m. January 22, 2005
46		Jill Biden; Born June 3, 1951 (age 75)	January 20, 2021 – January 20, 2025	69 years, 231 days	Joe Biden m. June 17, 1977
47		Melania Trump; Birth country: Yugoslavia (present day Slovenia); Born April 26, 1970 (age 56)	January 20, 2025 – Present	54 years, 269 days	Donald Trump m. January 22, 2005

== Other spouses of presidents of the United States ==
Certain spouses of presidents of the United States are not considered first ladies of the United States.

Four presidents were widowed prior to their presidencies:

- Thomas Jefferson was married to Martha Wayles from 1772 until her death in 1782.
- Andrew Jackson was married to Rachel Donelson from 1794 until her death in 1828.
- Martin Van Buren was married to Hannah Hoes from 1807 until her death in 1819.
- Chester A. Arthur was married to Ellen Lewis Herndon from 1859 until her death in 1880.

Two presidents were widowed and remarried prior to their presidencies:

- Theodore Roosevelt was married to Alice Lee from 1880 until her death in 1884. He was subsequently married to Edith Carow from 1886 to his death in 1919.
- Joe Biden was married to Neilia Hunter from 1966 until her death in 1972. He has subsequently been married to Jill Jacobs since 1977.

Two presidents were divorced and remarried prior to their presidencies:

- Ronald Reagan was married to Jane Wyman from 1940 until 1949. He was subsequently married to Nancy Davis from 1952 to his death in 2004.
- Donald Trump was married to Ivana Zelníčková from 1977 until 1992 and to Marla Maples from 1993 until 1999. He has subsequently been married to Melania Knauss since 2005.

Two presidents remarried after their presidencies:

- Millard Fillmore was married to Caroline Carmichael from 1858 until his death in 1874.
- Benjamin Harrison was married to Mary Dimmick, the niece of his first wife, from 1896 until his death in 1901.

== See also ==
- Bibliography of United States presidential spouses and first ladies
- Second ladies and gentlemen of the United States
- First family of the United States
- List of children of presidents of the United States
- List of current United States first spouses
- List of memoirs by first ladies of the United States
- List of presidents of the United States
- List of First Lady of the United States firsts
- Spouse of the prime minister of Canada
- First ladies and gentlemen of Mexico
- Category:Acting first ladies of the United States
