= Office of the First Lady of the United States =

Staff accountable to the hostess of the White House

Office of the First Lady
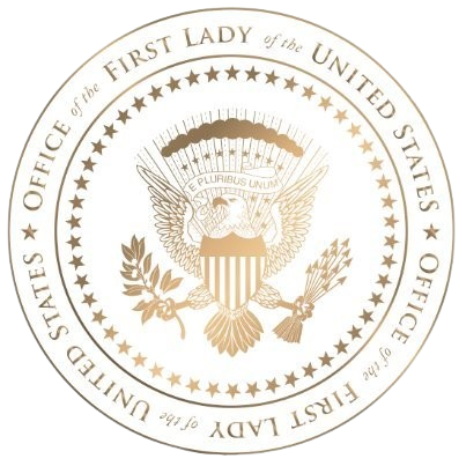

Office overview
- Formed: 1977
- Headquarters: East Wing of The White House
- Office executive: Chief of Staff to the First Lady, Hayley Harrison
- Parent Office: White House Office
- Website: First Lady Melania Trump

The Office of the First Lady (OFL) is the staff accountable to the first lady of the United States. The office and its responsibilities, while not constitutionally mandated, have grown as the role of the first lady has grown and formalized through the history of the United States. The Office of the First Lady is an entity of the White House Office, part of the Executive Office of the President. The physical offices were located in the White House's East Wing, prior to its demolition in October 2025. They have been temporarily relocated to other parts of the White House complex until the completion of the White House State Ballroom. The current first lady is Melania Trump, assuming office on January 20, 2025.

== History ==
Though the persona, activities, and initiatives of the first lady have always been significant to the history of the United States, the first first lady to hire federally-funded staff was Edith Roosevelt, who hired Belle Hagner as the first White House social secretary on October 2, 1901. Eleanor Roosevelt became the first first lady to expand the office beyond social and administrative secretaries by hiring Malvina Thompson as her personal secretary and Jackie Kennedy was the first to employ a press secretary.

Under Rosalynn Carter, the first lady's staff became known as the Office of the First Lady. She organized the office into four major departments: projects and community liaison, press and research, schedule and advance, and social and personal; and was the first to add a chief of staff. She was also the first to move her own work office into the East Wing. Though the role of the office has grown over the years, it primarily supports the first lady in promoting the agenda and campaigns of the president. Further to that, it provides support for the agenda of the first lady, who chooses causes and initiatives to campaign for during their time at the White House.

At the time of the East Wing demolition in October 2025, which was being done to make room for the White House State Ballroom, plans were made to transfer the Office of the First Lady to the Executive Residence, split between the Vermeil Room, the South Mezzanine, the Library and the China Room. However, it was also acknowledged that Melania Trump had in fact been spending minimal in the Office of the First Lady during her husband's second term as President. During that month, however, it was reported that Melania privately raised concerns over her husband's demolition of the East Wing. In November 2025, President Trump responded to these rumors saying Melania initially "loved her little tiny office" but quickly came around to support the renovation.

== Organization ==
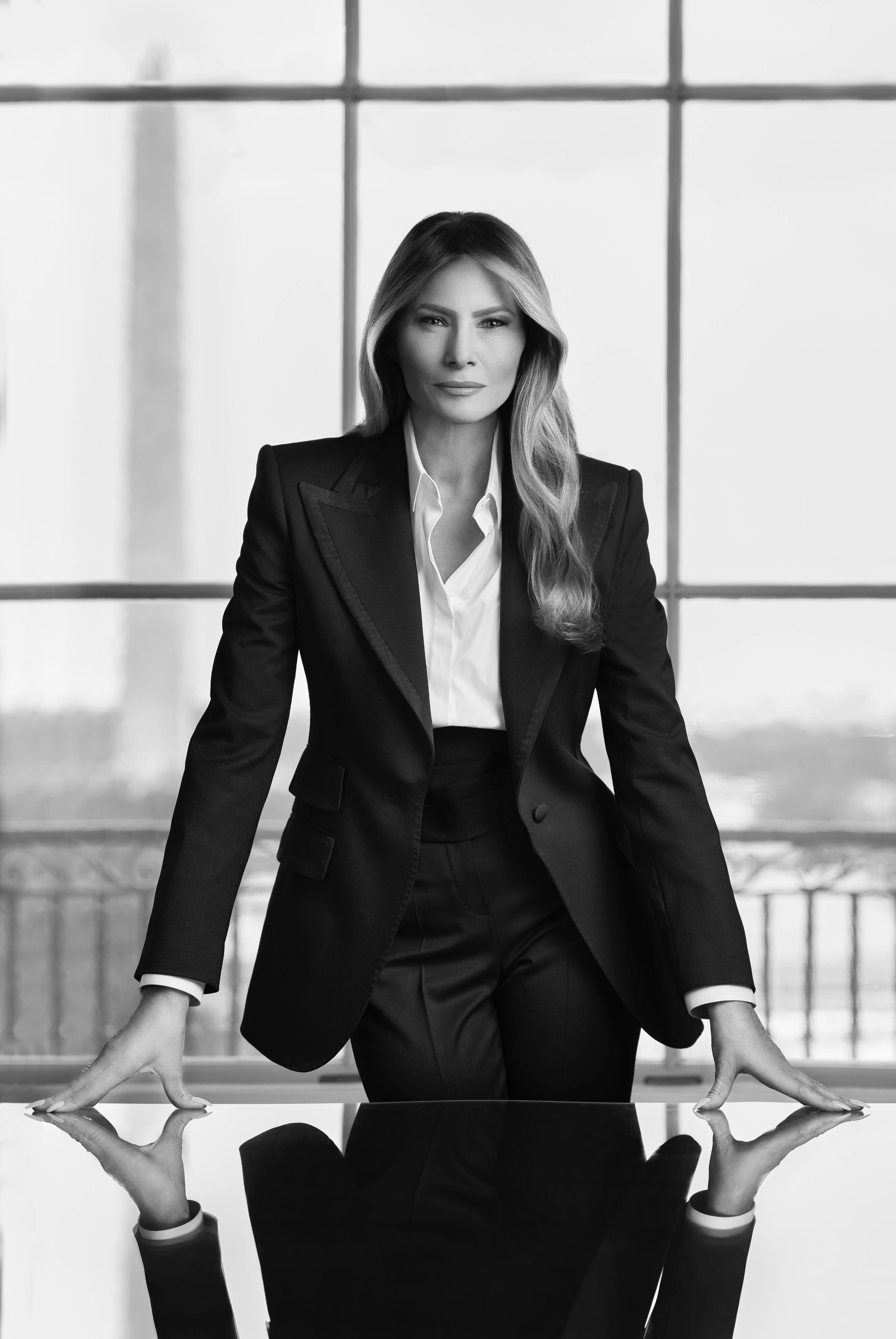
The first lady of the United States, Melania Trump

The first lady, Melania Trump, has her own staff. The information in the table below shows the key members of the current staff. On October 23, 2025, however, it was revealed that she had now "eschewed the nation's capital for New York and Palm Beach" and now employed a "skeletal staff".

Office	Incumbent
Chief of Staff to the First Lady	Hayley Harrison
Communication Director	Nick Clemens
Operations Director	Mary C. Finzer
Policy Director	Sarah J. Gesiriech
Scheduler	Meredith M. Thoren

== See also ==
- Bibliography of United States presidential spouses and first ladies
