= Andrea Ball =

American political aide

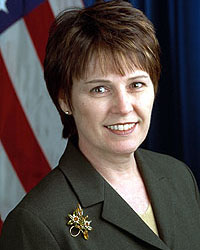
- Ball in 2001

Chief of Staff to the First Lady of the United States
- In office January 20, 2001 – January 31, 2005
- President: George W. Bush
- First Lady: Laura Bush
- Preceded by: Melanne Verveer
- Succeeded by: Anita McBride

Chief of Staff to the First Lady of Texas
- In office January 17, 1995 – December 21, 2000
- Governor: George W Bush
- First Lady: Laura Bush

Personal details
- Education: Alpena Community College

Andrea Ball is an American political aide who served as Chief of Staff to the First Lady of the United States, Laura Bush from 2001 to 2005 and Deputy Assistant to the President, George W. Bush during the same period. She previously worked as chief of staff to Laura Bush during her tenure as First Lady of Texas and held various roles within the Republican Party of Texas, including office manager and convention coordinator.

== Early life ==
Ball was originally from Michigan, where she attended Alpena Community College, earning an associate degree.

== Career ==
In 1984, Ball worked on the campaign of Republican congressional candidate Joe Barton. She later she joined the Republican Party of Texas, where she served as office manager and convention coordinator for seven years. In this role, she was involved in organizing state political events and managing administrative functions for the party.

In 1995, Ball became chief of staff to Laura Bush, who was then the first lady of Texas. In addition to this role, she also served as the arrangements director for the Texas inaugural committee, contributing to the planning and coordination of gubernatorial inaugural events.

When George W. Bush was elected in the 2000 United States presidential election, Ball transitioned to the White House, where she served as chief of staff to the first lady, Laura Bush and deputy assistant to the president from January 2001 to February 2005. Her duties included managing the First Lady's schedule, press relations, speech writing, correspondence, and overseeing entertainment and event planning. During her time in the White House, she was involved in hosting state and public events, including coordinating visits from foreign dignitaries, such as Queen Elizabeth II, and managing large-scale holiday celebrations.

Ball accompanied the First Lady and the President on international trips to 54 countries. Her work included organizing logistics for major events, such as meetings with Pope John Paul II and state visits to Buckingham Palace. She also supported Laura Bush's advocacy for literacy, education, historic preservation, and global health initiatives.

Ball experienced key historical events while serving at the White House, including the September 11 attacks. She was with Laura Bush during an early childhood conference when news of the attacks broke. Later that day, Ball saw the Pentagon attack as the U.S. Secret Service escorted them to a secure location.

After leaving the White House in February 2005, Ball returned to Texas, where she worked as the state director for Senator Kay Bailey Hutchison and later as a field director for Representative Roger Williams. These roles involved managing outreach efforts and coordinating with constituents in Texas.

== Personal life ==
Ball is married to Lonnie and referenced her husband's support during her time at the White House, particularly during September 11 attacks, when he was in Texas.
