= Susan Sher =

American lawyer and strategist

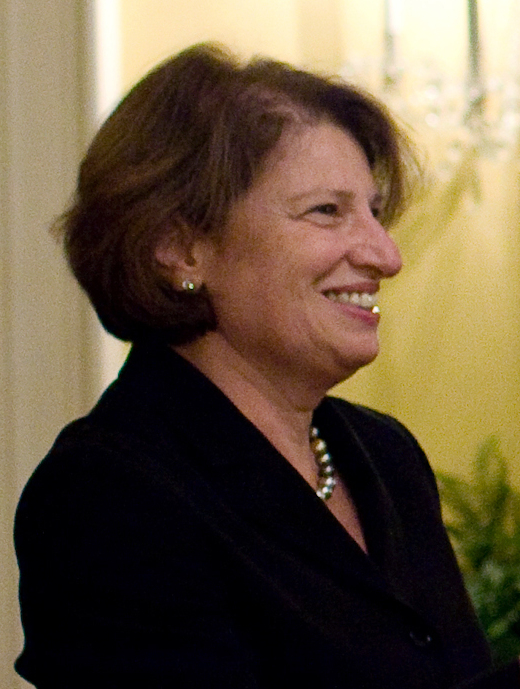
- Sher in 2009

Chief of Staff to the First Lady of the United States
- In office June 4, 2009 – January 5, 2011
- President: Barack Obama
- First Lady: Michelle Obama
- Preceded by: Jackie Norris
- Succeeded by: Tina Tchen

Personal details
- Born: Susan Steiner New Jersey, United States
- Spouse: Neil Cohen
- Children: Graham Moore, Evan Moore (entrepreneur, investor, Door Dash co-founder)

Susan Sher (née Steiner) is a lawyer and strategist in the United States who works for the University of Chicago and served as the chief of staff for the First Lady under Michelle Obama during the first two years of the Obama administration. She served as Corporation Counsel for the City of Chicago earlier in her career. She headed the Obama Library Committee.

Sher was born in New Jersey. She is married to judge Neil Cohen. Oscar winning screenwriter Graham Moore is her son.

Sher was portrayed by Kate Mulgrew in The First Lady. She succeeded Jackie Norris as First Lady Michelle Obama's chief of staff.
