= Hayley Harrison =

American political aide

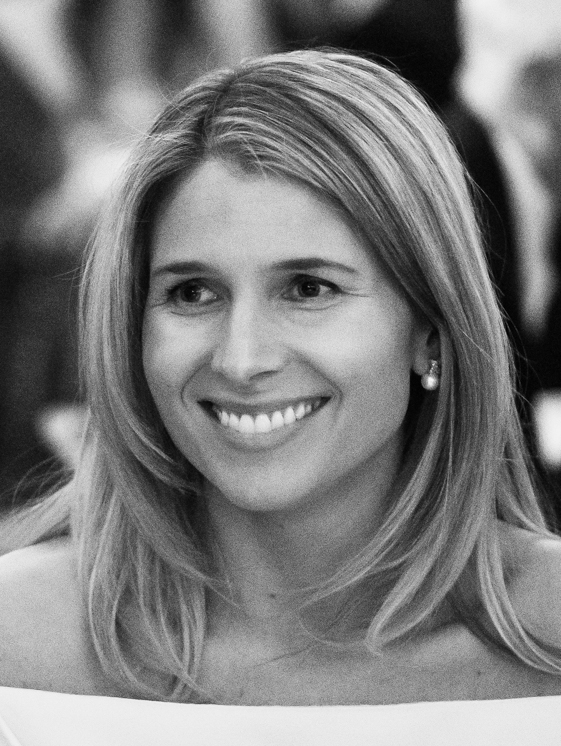
- Harrison in 2025

Chief of Staff to the First Lady of the United States
- Incumbent
- Assumed office January 20, 2025
- President: Donald Trump
- First Lady: Melania Trump
- Preceded by: Anthony Bernal

Personal details
- Born: Hayley D'Antuono
- Spouse: Beau Harrison (m. 2022)
- Education: Elon University (BA)

Hayley Harrison (née D'Antuono) is an American political aide who is the current chief of staff to the first lady of the United States. She is serving under Melania Trump during her second tenure as first lady. Harrison previously held roles within the first presidency of Donald Trump, including as Melania Trump's director of operations and as a special assistant to the president.

== Early life and education ==
Harrison was raised in Alexandria, Virginia. She attended Bishop Ireton High School, where she played varsity lacrosse; she graduated in 2010. Harrison then attended Elon University, where she was a member of the Phi Mu fraternity; she received a Bachelor of Arts in psychology in 2014. While there, she coauthored a study titled "Gender Differences in Student Perceptions of Literacy Activities", which was presented at the 26th annual Convention of the Association for Psychological Science.

== Career ==
Harrison began her career in politics as an office manager and scheduler for U.S. representative John Ratcliffe (R-TX), in Ratcliffe's first term in Congress. She worked in Ratcliffe's office until March, when she took a position as scheduler for U.S. first lady Melania Trump, following a recommendation from Ratcliffe. Over the course of Donald Trump’s first presidency, she received multiple promotions, eventually serving in a dual role as Melania Trump’s director of operations and as a special assistant to the president.

After leaving the White House in January 2021, Harrison continued to work for Melania Trump privately at Mar-a-Lago. Both she and her husband, Beau Harrison, remained part of the Trump family’s inner circle, receiving compensation through the Save America political action committee. She was paid between $8,000 and $10,000 per month, while her husband received similar compensation until late 2023.

Harrison’s role in the Mar-a-Lago classified documents case emerged publicly in 2022, when she was identified as "Trump Employee 1" in a federal indictment. The indictment detailed her involvement in managing the location of various items, including classified materials, at the estate. Text messages attributed to her revealed discussions about using alternative spaces, such as a bathroom shower, for storage purposes. Contemporaneous reporting did not indicate if Harrison knew she was illegally handling or directing the improper handling of classified material. The case against President Trump was ultimately dismissed in 2024.

On November 22, 2024, Melania Trump announced Harrison’s appointment as chief of staff to the first lady of the United States for her second tenure. In this role, Harrison is tasked with overseeing the East Wing’s operations and serving as a strategic liaison with other parts of the government. This appointment was the first major staffing decision of Melania Trump’s second term as first lady.

== Personal life ==
Harrison met her husband, Beau Harrison, in March 2017, her first day of work at the White House; they became engaged in November 2020. They married in May 2022 at the Basilica of St. Mary in Alexandria, Virginia.
