= Jackie Norris =

American political aide, educator and corporate strategist (born 1970)

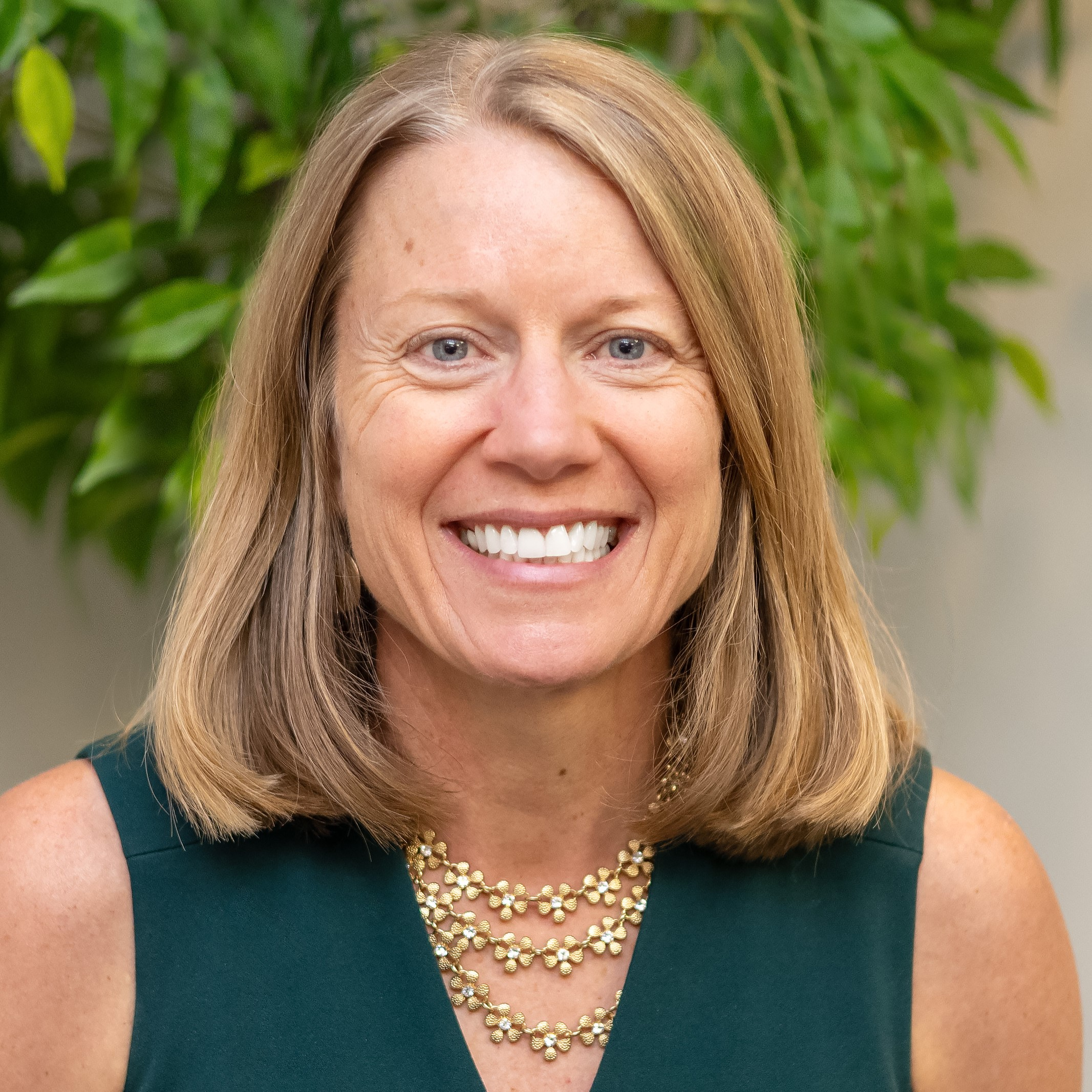
- Norris in 2024

Chief of Staff to the First Lady
- In office January 20, 2009 – June 4, 2009
- President: Barack Obama
- First Lady: Michelle Obama
- Preceded by: Anita McBride
- Succeeded by: Susan Sher

Personal details
- Born: 1970 (age 55–56) Ossining, New York, U.S.
- Education: State University of New York, Geneseo (BA); Iowa State University (MA)

Jackie Norris (born 1970) is a business owner and community leader in the United States. Norris is the current President and Owner of Horizon Group in West Des Moines, Iowa.

== Early life ==
Norris was born in Ossining, New York and earned a degree in political science from the State University of New York at Geneseo in 1992 followed by a master’s in political science from Iowa State University. In 2002, Norris also received her secondary education teacher certification from Iowa State University.

== Business and political career ==
Norris has served as an American government official, non-profit leader and small business owner. She has worked as Chief of Staff to the First Lady, Michelle Obama, in 2009 and as CEO of Goodwill of Central Iowa.

She serves as the Chair of the Des Moines School Board. In September 2025 she made statements for the Board around the arrest of Superintendent Ian Roberts of Des Moines Public Schools noting the Board was not aware of issues with his legal status until his detention.

She is President and Owner of Horizon Group, a marketing and consulting business.

On August 5, 2025, Norris announced her candidacy for the Democratic nomination in the 2026 United States Senate election in Iowa. On October 16, 2025, Norris ended her senatorial campaign due to her need to focus on leading the Des Moines public school board following the arrest of superintendent Ian Roberts.

== Personal life ==
Norris is married to John R. Norris, former Commissioner at the Federal Energy Regulatory Commission (FERC), and Minister Counselor to the United States Mission to the United Nations (USUN) in Rome, Italy. Norris has three sons.
