= Delta Financial Corporation =

Defunct American subprime lender

- Company type: Public (Nasdaq: DFC) (Delisted)
- Industry: Mortgage
- Founded: 1996
- Headquarters: Woodbury, New York
- Key people: Hugh Miller, president and chief executive officer
- Products: Sub-Prime Loans

Delta Funding Corporation (abbreviated to DFC) was a specialty consumer finance company that originated, securitized and sold non-conforming mortgage loans.

== History ==
DFC was incorporated in 1996 as a Delaware corporation. It was a sub-prime lender focused on lending to individuals who generally did not satisfy the credit, documentation or other underwriting standards set by more traditional sources of mortgage credit, including entities that issued loans in compliance with the conforming lending guidelines of Fannie Mae and Freddie Mac. In 2006, DFC originated $4.0 billion of loans; in 2005 it originated $3.8 billion. A substantial amount of these loans were sourced through telemarketing.

== Bankruptcy ==
On December 17, 2007, DFC and its operating subsidiaries Delta Funding Corporation, Renaissance Mortgage Acceptance Corporation and Renaissance REIT Investment Corporation, filed voluntary petitions for relief under Chapter 11 of the U.S. Bankruptcy Code with the United States Bankruptcy Court for the District of Delaware. On December 20, 2007 DFC announced that it would be delisted from NASDAQ by December 28, 2007.

== Employee relations and criticism ==
In 2004 DFC and its retail subsidiary, Fidelity Mortgage, Inc. were sued in the United States District Court for the Western District of Pennsylvania. The lawsuit was filed by former loan officers employed by its subsidiary Fidelity Mortgage, Inc., who accused the company of misclassifying their loan officers as exempt from the federal Fair Labor Standards Act. The plaintiffs were represented by Nichols Kaster, PLLP. The case was remained unresolved when DFC filed for bankruptcy protection.
