= Haile Thomas =

American motivational speaker

- Born: December 23, 2000 (age 25); Dallas, TX
- Occupations: Health Activist; Vegan Chef; Motivational speaker Founder/CEO The HAPPY Organization
- Years active: 6
- Organization: The HAPPY Organization
- Known for: Health Activism
- Website: hailevthomas.com

Haile Thomas (born December 23, 2000) is a Jamaican-American international speaker, youth health activist, vegan food and lifestyle influencer, the youngest Certified Integrative Nutrition Health Coach in the United States, and the founder/CEO of the nonprofit HAPPY (Healthy Active Positive Purposeful Youth)

== Background and education ==
Thomas, whose parents immigrated from Jamaica, was inspired to cook by her mother, who taught her how to cook at the age of five. Thomas began exploring healthier cooking with her family when her father was diagnosed with Type 2 diabetes in 2008. In 2009, she started a YouTube channel, Kids Can Cook, with her four-year-old sister Nia.

Thomas attended St. Gregory College Preparatory School, but was later homeschooled. She is the youngest graduate from the Institute for Integrative Nutrition, trained as a certified integrative nutrition health coach. In September 2016, Thomas moved with her family from Arizona to New York in order to expand her business.

== Health advocacy ==
In 2012, Thomas created one of the winning entries - a salad of quinoa, black beans, and corn - in the first White House Kids' State Dinner, hosted by Michelle Obama as part of her Let's Move! campaign. Thomas introduced the First Lady at the 2013 Kids' State Dinner, and also joined her at the 2013 State of the Union Address.

In 2013, Thomas founded The HAPPY Organization, to bring nutrition education to youth through cooking classes, summer camps, and in-school programs.

In 2015, Thomas began employment at the Canyon Ranch Institute as a nutrition science assistant.

In 2016, Thomas partnered with the non-profit organization Harlem Grown to provide education in urban farming, sustainability, and nutrition.

In 2017, Thomas graduated as the youngest Integrative Nutrition Health Coach from the Institute for Integrative Nutrition.

Thomas has served on the youth advisory boards for Alliance for a Healthier Generation and ChopChopKids, and as a Junior Chef Advisor for Hyatt Hotels.

Thomas has given talks for TEDx, Deepak Chopra's Sages and Scientists Symposium, The Clinton Foundation's Health Matters Conference, Partnership for a Healthier America Summit, and the YWCA Women's Leadership Conference.

== Media appearances ==
Thomas has appeared on The Today Show, Rachael Ray's Kids Cook-Off, and The Dr. Oz Show. She has been featured in Fortune, O, The Oprah Magazine, Teen Vogue, and YES! Magazine.

== Publications ==
- Nancy Mehagian; Haile Thomas (December 25, 2013). The Supernatural Kids Cookbook - Haile's Favorites. Huqua Press. ISBN 9780983812067.
