= The Gregory School =

Coordinates: 32°15′57.6318″N 110°52′39.94″W

Location
- 3231 N. Craycroft Road; Tucson, Arizona 85712; United States

Information
- School type: Independent
- Established: 1980 (46 years ago)
- CEEB code: 030506
- Head of school: James Foreman (2025)
- Grades: 5–12
- Enrollment: 368 students in grades 5-12
- Colors: Columbia blue, navy blue, and white
- Slogan: "A Tradition of Inspiring Excellence"
- Mascot: Hawks
- Website: www.gregoryschool.org

The Gregory School is an independent, private, coed middle and high school in Tucson, Arizona, United States.

The Gregory School offers grades 5–12 and as of 2026 has 368 students with an average class size of 15 students per class. The school's 35-acre campus in Tucson includes a 370-seat theater, science and technology center, basketball and volleyball gymnasium, band room, athletics fields, a state-of-the-art fabrication lab, a collegiate-style writing center, and a dining hall.

The Gregory School is the only school in Southern Arizona accredited by the Independent Schools Association of the Southwest (ISAS). It is also a member of the National Association of Independent Schools (NAIS).

== History ==
The idea for the Gregory School began with Ruth McCormick "Bazy" Tankersley, an Arabian horse breeder and former publisher of the Washington Times-Herald. In 1978, she decided that Tucson needed another private school and took her first steps in this endeavor by purchasing a book on how to start a school, as well as writing to the National Association of Independent Schools for materials and information.

Her vision was for an Episcopal college-preparatory school in Tucson. She enlisted the help of the Rev. Roger Douglas, then rector of the St. Philip's in the Hills Episcopal Church and a small number of interested friends. In time, an independent board of trustees was created to establish the school as a 501 c(3) entity, able to receive tax-deductible donations.

Tankersley was soon joined by Jane Ivancovich as the main benefactors for the new school. Ivancovich, a devout Catholic, was tasked with coming up with the school name. After conferring with her spiritual adviser, she suggested the name St. Gregory I (Gregory the Great), the patron saint of teachers and students, with the board of trustees soon approving the name. Tankersley and Ivancovich, within a year, were joined by Margaret Modine-Gomez as the third benefactor for the school.

The board of trustees then carried out a nationwide search for a headmaster to lead the new school. After a while, they chose the Rev. Russell W. "Russ" Ingersoll, who had been rector and headmaster at private boarding schools in Virginia and Wisconsin. In turn, Ingersoll, working out of a rented trailer in the unpaved parking lot of the St. Philip's Episcopal Church, carried out a national search for teachers to fill the necessary posts for the school. By January 1980, he had hired the school's first teachers: Christopher Boyle of Delaware for English, Vinton Geistfeld of Minnesota for math, Oscar Morales of Tucson for languages and Howard Zeskind of Washington, D.C., for history.

Meanwhile, a site committee looked for suitable land and, in March 1980, selected a parcel on North Craycroft Road near East River Road. It had been part of the Fort Lowell Military Reserve in the late 1800s. Following this it was included in the William Haynes homestead property. It had several successive owners until Dickson B. Potter purchased the land in 1945.

Potter was a native of New York but had kept a home in the Old Pueblo since the late 1930s. He and his wife, Sue, established the Potter School for Girls across the street from the Arizona Inn on Elm Street, along Potter Place, a small street that ran by the school. His Tucson land became known as the Potter Ranch; a ranch house and stables were constructed for the riding master who lived there and taught English and Western style riding.

St. Gregory Episcopal High School opened on September 5, 1980, with approximately 50 students. Eventually the school ended its affiliation with the St. Philip's in the Hills Episcopal Church and became a non-religious educational institution, known as St. Gregory High School.

The school was known as St. Gregory College Preparatory School before 2014, when it was renamed to The Gregory School. The rename coincided with the addition of fifth grade.

== Athletics ==
The Gregory School fields 14 sports.

Arizona Interscholastic Association State Championships

- Boys' tennis '87, '88, '90, '91, '92, '93, '97, '98, '00, '08, '09, '10, '11
- Girls' tennis '99, '00, '01, '08, '11, '17
- Boys' basketball '08, '09, '18, '19, '24, '25
- Baseball '99

Arizona Interscholastic Association Region/Section Championships

- Boys' tennis '88, '90, '91, '92, '93, '94, '95, '96, '97, '98, '99, '00, '01, '04, '05, '08, '09, '10, '12 '13
- Girls' tennis '91, '92, '94, '98, '99, '00, '01, '08, '14
- Boys' soccer '89, '92, '99, '03, '05, '07, '08 '13
- Boys' basketball '06, '07, '08, '09, '10, '14, '16, '17, '18, '19, '24, '25
- Baseball '92, '93, '99
- Softball '92, '93, '00
- Girls' basketball '96, '14
- Girls' golf '08
- Girls' soccer '08

Arizona Interscholastic Association State Runner-ups

- Girls' tennis '92, '93, '94
- Boys' tennis '92, '99, ‘26
- Boys' soccer '06, '07
- Boys' basketball '98, '17
- Girls' golf '08

== Notable alumni ==
- Anthony Bernal
- Haile Thomas
