= White House Family Theater =

Demolished White House movie theater

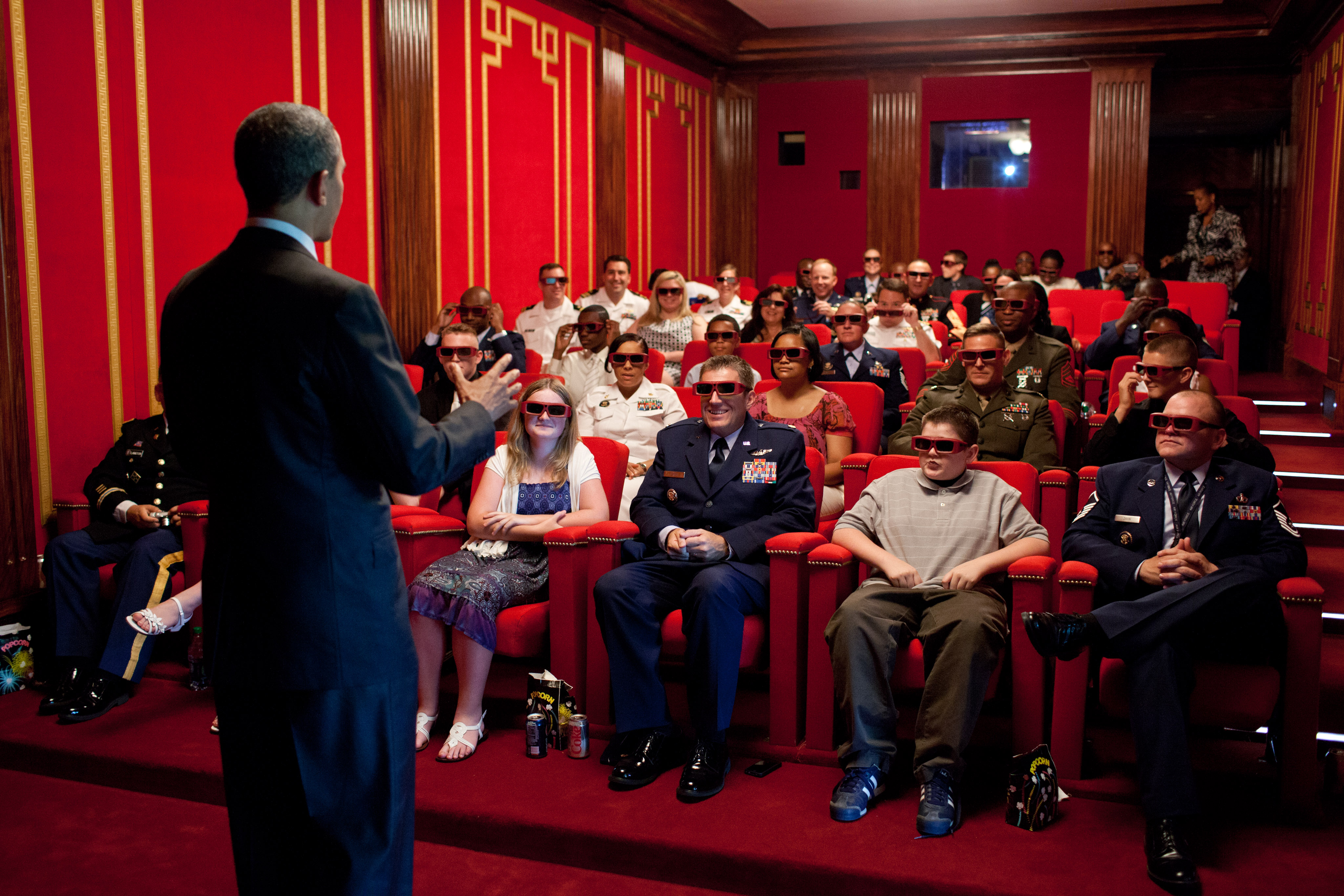
- President Obama greeting viewers before a screening of Men in Black 3 in 3D in the White House Family Theater in 2012
- Interactive map of White House Family Theater
- Address: 1600 Pennsylvania Avenue, Washington, D.C., United States
- Location: East Wing of the White House
- Coordinates: 38.8977°N 77.036°W
- Owner: United States government
- Operator: Office of the Chief Usher
- Capacity: 42

Construction
- Opened: July 1942
- Demolished: October 2025

The White House Family Theater was a small movie theater located in the East Wing of the White House in Washington, D.C., for the use of the president and his family. Originally there was no room in the White House specifically for screening films, so the venue was converted from a cloakroom in 1942. It seated up to 42 people.

It was demolished along with the rest of the East Wing in October 2025. In January 2026, the White House confirmed plans to build a new theater as part of a new East Wing containing a ballroom. The following month, the updated plans revealed that the original 42-seat configuration and furniture of the original theater would remain when the renovated one would be built.

== History ==
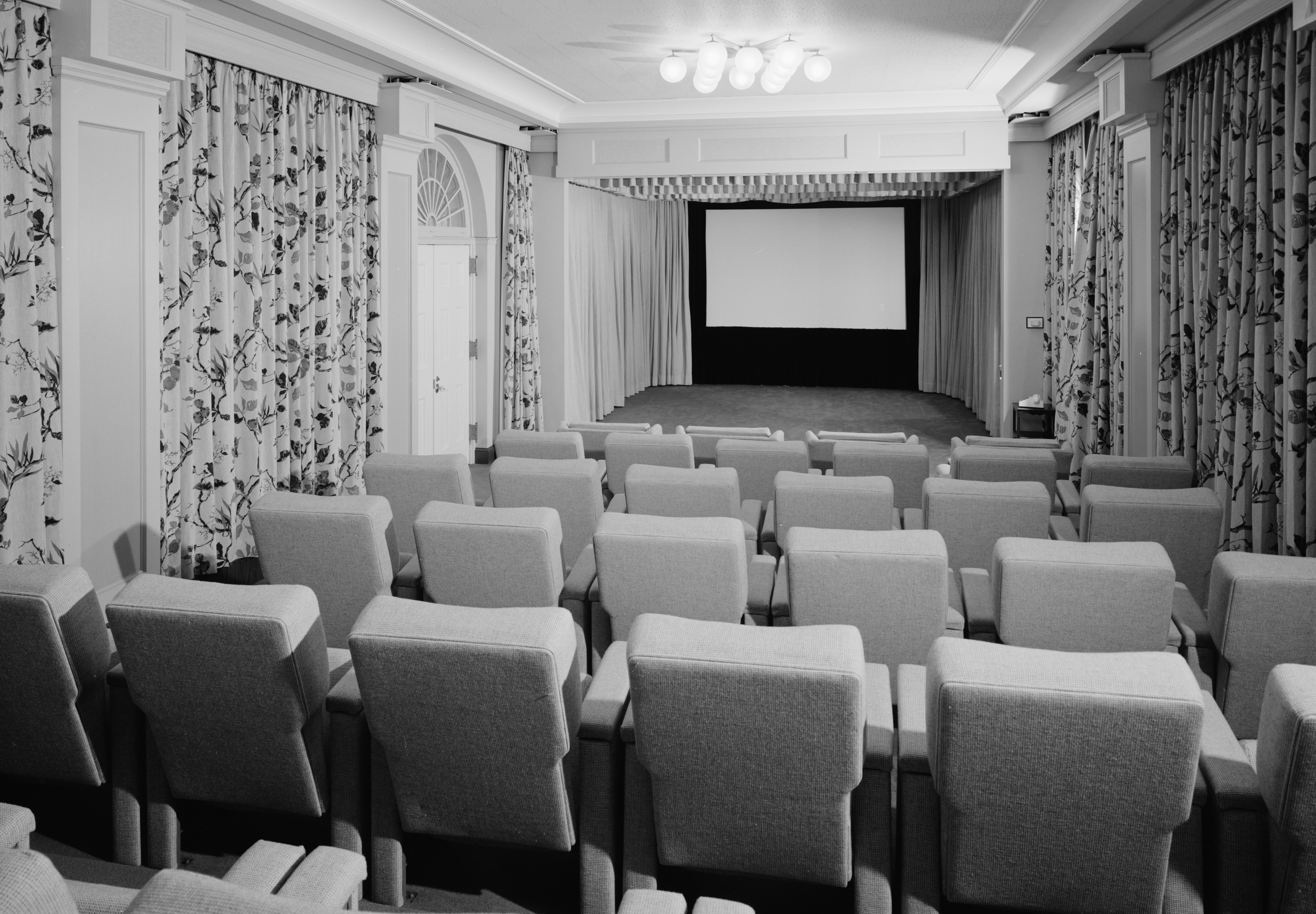
Movie theater, East Wing, 1976

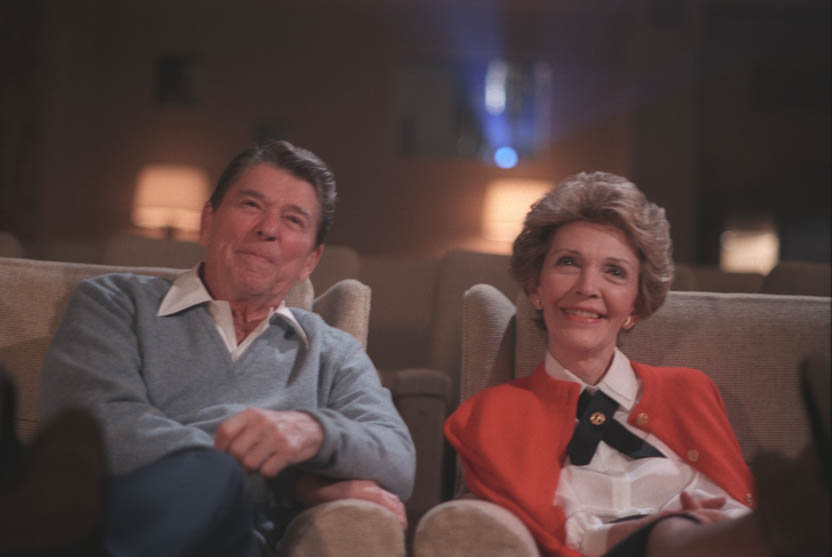
Ronald Reagan and Nancy Reagan watch a film in the White House Family Theater in 1986.

Prior to the 1942 construction of the theater, early film viewings occurred in the main building as the facility lacked a dedicated theater. The first film screened in the White House was The Birth of a Nation in 1915.

Originally a cloakroom known as the "Hat Box", the White House Family Theater was converted into a dedicated movie theater in 1942 on the orders of Franklin Roosevelt.

Traditionally, American studios have made their films available to the White House on request, either directly or through the Motion Picture Association of America. Landing a screening in the White House Family Theater was considered a valuable marketing tool by studios.

In the 1980s, the motion picture industry financed renovation of the facility, which added terraced seating and other amenities. During the presidency of George W. Bush the facility was redecorated in "movie palace red". In addition to its use in screening films, the theater was used by presidents to rehearse speeches.

In late October 2025, the theater, along with the rest of the East Wing, was demolished for the construction of a new East Wing to house the White House State Ballroom. However, a source familiar with the matter revealed to the Hollywood Reporter that "the movie theater will be modernized and renovated with the rest of the East Wing."

=== Films viewed ===
As of 1998, Jimmy Carter had viewed more films in the White House Family Theater than any other person, having watched 480 films in the facility during his four-year term, beginning with All The President's Men. The first film watched by Bill Clinton in the White House Family Theater was Lorenzo's Oil on January 27, 1993. The final film Clinton watched was Chocolat on January 6, 2001.

In March 2010, the series The Pacific was screened at the White House Family Theater. President Obama, members of Congress, the Joint Chiefs of Staff, Veterans of Foreign Wars (VFW), and Women in Military Service for America Memorial were joined by producers Steven Spielberg and Tom Hanks to watch the first hour of the series.

The first film screened during the presidency of Donald Trump was Finding Dory. Trump also screened Sunset Boulevard, one of his favorite films, on multiple occasions. President Trump also screened the film Joker on November 16, 2019, shortly after the film's release, and it was reported he greatly enjoyed the film and found it intriguing.

Shortly after moving into the White House upon the reelection of Trump, JD Vance shared that he watched Gladiator II with his wife.
