= Anthony Bernal =

American political aide

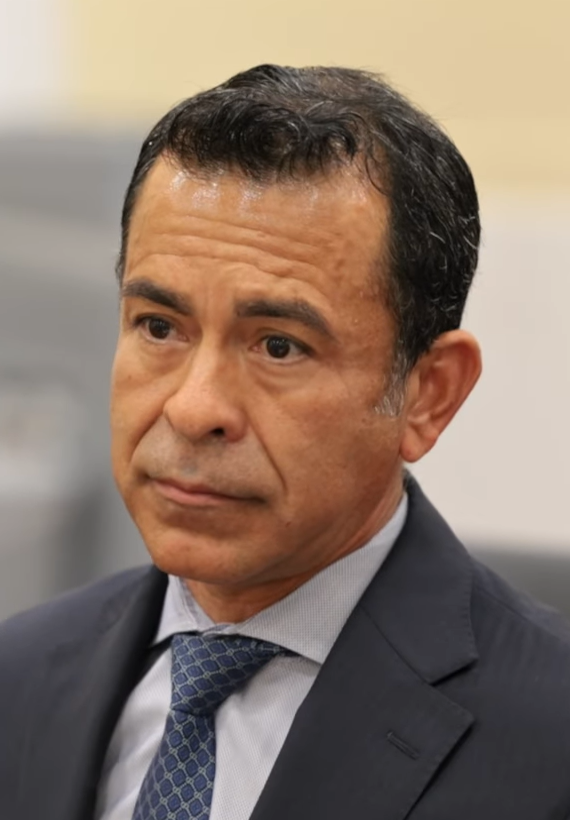
- Bernal in 2025

Chief of Staff to the First Lady of the United States
- In office January 7, 2022 – January 20, 2025
- President: Joe Biden
- First Lady: Jill Biden
- Preceded by: Julissa Reynoso Pantaleón
- Succeeded by: Hayley Harrison

Senior Advisor to the First Lady of the United States
- In office January 20, 2021 – January 20, 2025
- First Lady: Jill Biden

Personal details
- Born: Anthony Bernal; 1972 or 1973 (age 52–53) United States
- Party: Democratic
- Education: The Gregory School; Carleton College
- Alma mater: University of Texas at El Paso

Anthony Bernal is an American political aide. He served as a senior advisor to First Lady of the United States Jill Biden from 2022 to 2025.

== Early life and education ==
Bernal graduated from St. Gregory College Preparatory School in Tucson, Arizona, in 1991, attended Carleton College in Northfield, Minnesota, and graduated from the University of Texas at El Paso. He is Latino and openly gay.

== Career ==
Bernal previously served in the administrations of Presidents Barack Obama and Bill Clinton. During the Biden Administration, he served as Trip Director and Director of Scheduling for Jill Biden.

During Joe Biden's 2024 presidential campaign, Bernal served as a deputy campaign manager.

On May 22, 2025, due to concerns about Joe Biden's level of mental fitness while in office, the Congressional Committee on Oversight and Government Reform requested a voluntary interview on June 26. Bernal refused after the withdrawing of executive privilege by the Trump White House, and was thus subpoenaed by the committee.

On July 10, 2024, Bernal was subpoenaed by the House Oversight Committee requesting he sit for a deposition regarding President Biden's health.

Bernal was reportedly one of four aides present at the meeting at Biden's house in Rehoboth Beach, Delaware, on July 18, 2024, which led to Biden's decision to withdraw from the 2024 United States presidential election.

On July 16, 2025, Bernal pleaded the fifth amendment during a House Oversight Committee deposition after being questioned on Biden's use of an autopen throughout his administration. This came after the former President's physician, Kevin O'Connor, did the same in an earlier deposition on July 8, 2025.
