= Non-conforming mortgage =

A non-conforming mortgage is a term in the United States for a residential mortgage that does not conform to the loan purchasing guidelines set by the Federal National Mortgage Association /Federal Home Loan Mortgage Corporation (Fannie Mae and Freddie Mac). Mortgages which are non-conforming because they have a dollar amount over the purchasing limit set by FNMA/FHLMC are often called "jumbo" mortgages. Mortgages which are non-conforming because they do not meet FNMA/FHLMC underwriting guidelines (such as credit quality or loan-to-value ratio) are sometimes mistakenly called "subprime" mortgages. Non-conforming loans must remain in a lender's portfolio, or be sold to other companies who purchase non-conforming loans, or be securitized, with the securities being sold to investors seeking non-conforming mortgage-backed securities. Consequently, a premium is paid by those obtaining non-conforming mortgages, generally .25 or .5 points more than the same loan would cost if it were conforming. The loan amount is adjusted every few years depending upon the average sales price of homes in the U.S.

== History of conforming loan limits ==
With passage of the economic stimulus package in 2008, Fannie Mae and Freddie Mac were temporarily authorized to purchase loans in high-cost areas, up to 125% of the area's median home price, not to exceed $729,750, except in Alaska, Hawaii, Guam, and the US Virgin Islands, where higher limits may apply.

Year	One Family ($)	Two Family ($)	Three Family ($)	Four Family ($)
2015	417,000	533,850	645,300	801,950
2014	417,000	533,850	645,300	801,950
2008	417,000	533,850	645,300	801,950
2007	417,000	533,850	645,300	801,950
2006	417,000	533,850	645,300	801,950
2005	359,650	460,400	556,500	691,600
2004	333,700	427,150	516,300	641,650
2003	322,700	413,100	499,300	620,500
2002	300,700	384,900	465,200	578,150
2001	275,000	351,950	425,400	528,700
2000	252,700	323,400	390,900	485,800
1999	240,000	307,100	371,200	461,350
1998	227,150	290,650	351,300	436,600
1997	214,600	274,550	331,850	412,450
1996	207,000	264,750	320,050	397,800
1995	203,150	259,850	314,100	390,400
1994	203,150	259,850	314,100	390,400
1993	203,150	259,850	314,100	390,400
1992	202,300	258,800	312,800	388,800
1991	191,250	244,650	295,650	367,500
1990	187,450	239,750	289,750	360,150
1989	187,600	239,950	290,000	360,450
1988	168,700	215,800	260,800	324,150
1987	153,100			
1986	133,250			
1985	115,300			
1984	114,000			
1983	108,300			
1982	107,000	136,800	165,100	205,300
1981	98,500	126,000	152,000	189,000
1980	93,750			
