= Anita McBride =

American academic and former government official

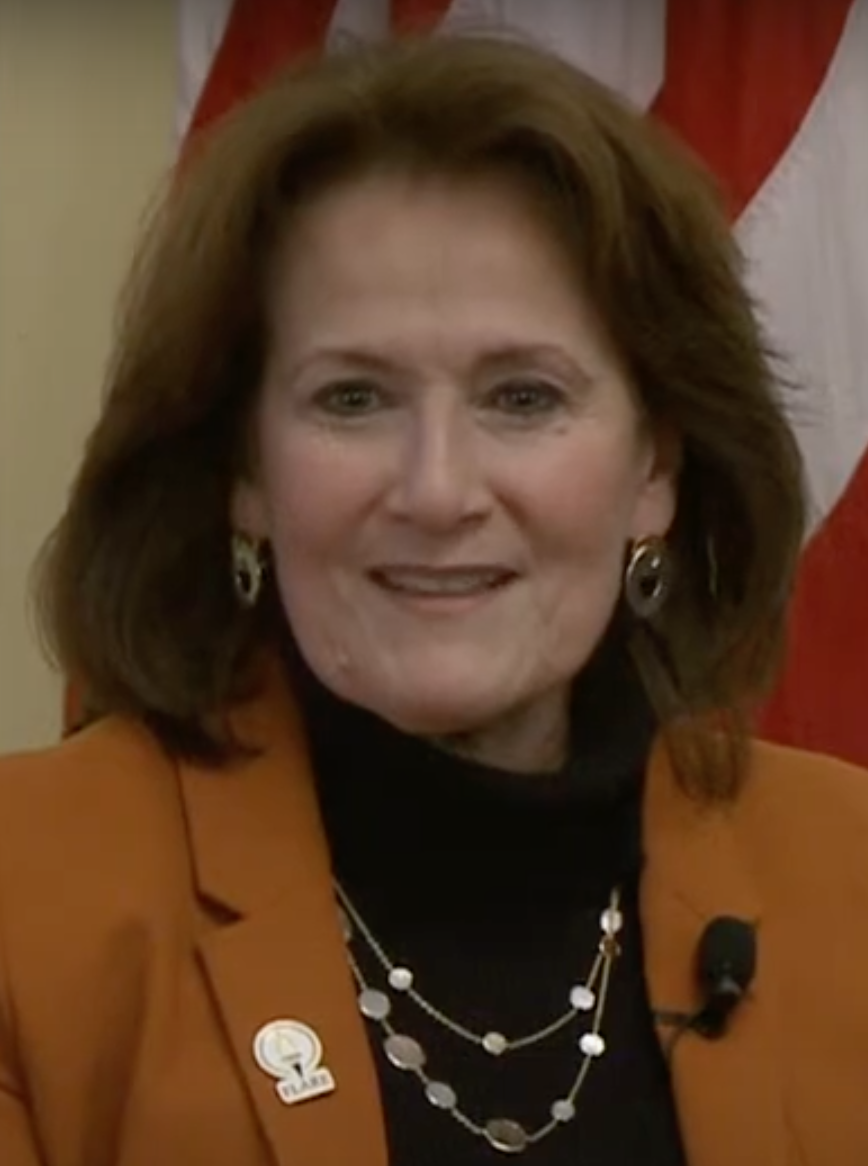
- McBride in 2024

Chief of Staff to the First Lady of the United States
- In office January 20, 2005 – January 20, 2009
- President: George W. Bush
- First Lady: Laura Bush
- Preceded by: Andrea Ball
- Succeeded by: Jackie Norris

Personal details
- Born: Bridgeport, Connecticut, U.S.
- Children: 2
- Education: University of Connecticut

Anita B. McBride is an American academic and former government official who served in the White House under three presidential administrations, including as Chief of Staff to the First Lady of the United States under Laura Bush from 2005 to 2009. She is currently an executive-in-residence at American University School of Public Affairs, where she directs the First Ladies Initiative, focusing on the historical roles and contributions of first ladies in American politics and diplomacy.

== Early life ==
McBride was born in Bridgeport, Connecticut. She attended the University of Connecticut, initially pursuing pre-medical studies but later switching to international studies after realizing that her academic performance in science courses was not conducive to a medical career. Her shift in focus led her to study abroad, during which she witnessed anti-American protests and developed an interest in public service. She subsequently participated in the American University Washington Semester Program to complete her degree requirements and further explore her interests in political science and governance.

== Career ==
McBride began her career as a volunteer for the Ronald Reagan 1980 presidential campaign in Hartford, Connecticut. She later joined the Republican National Committee as a volunteer before securing a role in the White House during the presidency of Ronald Reagan, initially working in correspondence review. By the final year of the administration, she had risen to the position of director of White House Personnel, a role she continued during the presidential transition of George H. W. Bush.

During the presidency of George W. Bush, McBride served in several capacities, including assistant to the president for White House Management and Chief of Staff to the First Lady of the United States for Laura Bush from 2005 to 2009. In the latter role, she managed Bush's staff and oversaw domestic and international initiatives aligned with U.S. foreign policy objectives. These included efforts related to human rights, women's empowerment, global health, and education. During her tenure, she accompanied Bush on visits to 67 countries.

McBride also held positions at the U.S. Department of State, serving as the White House Liaison and as a senior advisor in the Bureau of International Organizations. She co-founded the RAND African First Ladies Initiative and Fellowship program to support health and education initiatives in Africa.

McBride became an executive-in-residence at the Center for Congressional and Presidential Studies at American University School of Public Affairs, where she directs the First Ladies Initiative. This program explores the historical roles of first ladies in American politics and diplomacy. She is a member of several boards and councils, including the White House Historical Association and the U.S.-Afghan Women's Council. In 2024, she coauthored the book, Remember the First Ladies. McBride has publicly spoken about the absence of Melania Trump, and how she is doing an old job, in a modern way.

== Personal life ==
McBride met her husband, Tim McBride, while working at the White House during the Reagan administration. Tim McBride served as a personal aide to George H. W. Bush during his vice presidency and presidency. The couple has two children. As of 2024, McBride resides in the Spring Valley neighborhood of Washington, D.C.
