= Chief of Staff to the First Lady of the United States =

Chief of staff position within the Office of the First Lady of the United States

Chief of Staff of the Office of the First Lady
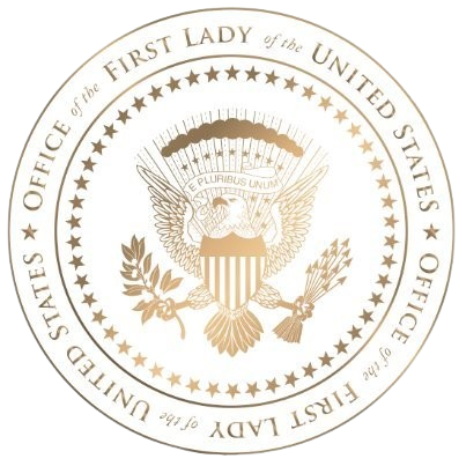

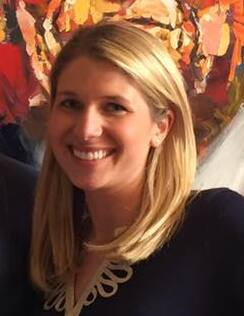
- Incumbent; Hayley Harrison since January 20, 2025
- Office of the First Lady of the United States, White House Office
- Reports to: First Lady of the United States
- Appointer: First Lady of the United States
- Formation: 1977
- First holder: Edith H. J. Dobelle

The chief of staff to the first lady of the United States is a position within the Office of the First Lady in the White House Office, responsible for overseeing strategy, operations, and coordination within the first lady's office and between the East Wing and the White House.

== Historical background ==
=== Origins of the role ===
The role of the first lady of the United States has evolved over time. During the 19th century, first ladies primarily focused on social functions and domestic duties. This began to shift in the 20th century, particularly under Eleanor Roosevelt, who actively engaged in policy advocacy and public initiatives. Roosevelt was the first First Lady to hire a personal secretary, an act that laid the foundation for the future establishment of the Office of the First Lady within the White House Office.

The position of chief of staff to the first lady emerged during the presidency of Jimmy Carter in 1977 when Rosalynn Carter formalized the structure of the Office of the First Lady. She appointed Edith H. J. Dobelle as the first Chief of Staff to the First Lady, who described her role as ensuring the office's smooth operation. This development paralleled the growing professionalization of the First Lady’s office.

Under subsequent administrations, the chief of staff role expanded to include a wide range of responsibilities. By the late 20th century, First Ladies’ chiefs of staff were integral in managing press relations, social scheduling, and correspondence. The position also became involved in policy development, particularly in administrations where the First Lady undertook advocacy roles, such as Hillary Clinton’s health care initiatives.

On October 23, 2025, it was revealed that Melania Trump, who was now no longer living in Washington D.C., now employed a "skeletal staff."

== Role ==
=== Core functions ===
The Chief of Staff to the First Lady is tasked with overseeing daily operations within the Office of the First Lady. This includes managing the work of departments such as policy and projects, scheduling, advance, correspondence, press, and the social office. The position also involves coordinating with the White House Chief of Staff and other executive offices, ensuring alignment with the administration’s broader goals.

Key responsibilities of the role include:

- Developing and executing strategies for domestic and international initiatives led by the First Lady.
- Acting as a liaison between the First Lady’s office and the West Wing, particularly for joint events or initiatives involving the President.
- Supervising staff and ensuring that office activities reflect the First Lady’s priorities and interests.
- Representing the First Lady at official functions and media engagements, as needed.

The Chief of Staff to the First Lady leads a team of 25 to 30 staff members, depending on the administration. This team is divided into various departments to handle specific functions. The position also involves working closely with external organizations and federal agencies to support the First Lady's initiatives.

=== Evolution of duties ===
The role’s scope and influence have varied depending on the priorities of each First Lady. For instance:

- Under Nancy Reagan, the office primarily focused on supporting the President's well-being and public image.
- During Hillary Clinton’s tenure, the chief of staff played a significant role in coordinating policy initiatives that were deeply integrated with the President’s agenda.
- Recent chiefs of staff, such as those serving Michelle Obama and Jill Biden, have been involved in initiatives addressing issues like education, health, and military families.

== Chiefs of staff to the first lady ==
Image	Chief	Years	First Lady
	Edith H. J. Dobelle	1979–1981	Rosalynn Carter
	James Rosebush	1981–1986	Nancy Reagan
	Lee L. Verstandig	1986	Nancy Reagan
Vacant; February 1986 – January 20, 1989			Nancy Reagan
	Susan Porter Rose	1989–1993	Barbara Bush
	Maggie Williams	1993–1997	Hillary Clinton
	Melanne Verveer	1997–2000	Hillary Clinton
	Andrea Ball	2001–2004	Laura Bush
	Anita McBride	2005–2009	Laura Bush
	Jackie Norris	2009-?	Michelle Obama
	Susan Sher	?-2011	Michelle Obama
	Tina Tchen	2011–2017	Michelle Obama
	Lindsay Reynolds	2017–2020	Melania Trump
	Stephanie Grisham	2020–2021	Melania Trump
	Julissa Reynoso Pantaleón	2021–2022	Jill Biden
	Anthony Bernal	2022–2025	Jill Biden
	Hayley Harrison	2025–	Melania Trump

== Popular culture ==
- Kate Mulgrew portrays Susan Sher in The First Lady.
