= East Wing =

1902–2025 portion of the White House

- The East Wing of the White House in 2007

General information
- Status: Demolished
- Coordinates: 38°53′51.2″N 77°2′8.4″W
- Completed: 1902; 1942
- Demolished: October 2025

The East Wing was a portion of the White House complex in Washington, D.C. It was built in 1902, significantly expanded in 1942, and demolished in 2025.

Situated on the east side of the Executive Residence, the building served as office space for the first lady and her staff, including the White House social secretary, correspondence staff, and the White House Graphics and Calligraphy Office, all of which have been relocated until the new East Wing is completed.

The East Wing was connected to the Executive Residence through the East Colonnade, a corridor with windows facing the South Lawn that housed the White House Family Theater and connected to the ground floor of the Executive Residence.

In 1942, President Franklin D. Roosevelt oversaw an expansion and remodeling of the East Wing, which included the construction of the Presidential Emergency Operations Center beneath the building.

The demolished wing is being replaced by a larger replacement wing to include the White House State Ballroom. The new East Wing is scheduled for completion by 2028.

== History ==
=== Background ===
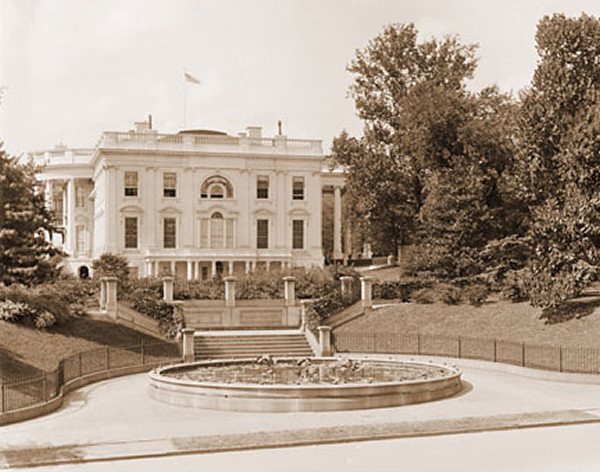
The White House East Entrance in 1899, before the first East Wing construction

President Thomas Jefferson added colonnaded terraces to the east and west sides of the White House, but no actual wings. Under President Andrew Jackson in 1834, running water was piped in from a spring and pumped up into the east terrace in metal pipes. These ran through the walls and protruded into the rooms, controlled by spigots. Initially, the water was for washing items, but soon the first bathing rooms were created, in the ground-level east colonnade. President Martin Van Buren had shower baths installed here.

The East Terrace was removed in 1866. For many years, a greenhouse occupied the east grounds of the White House.

=== Construction ===
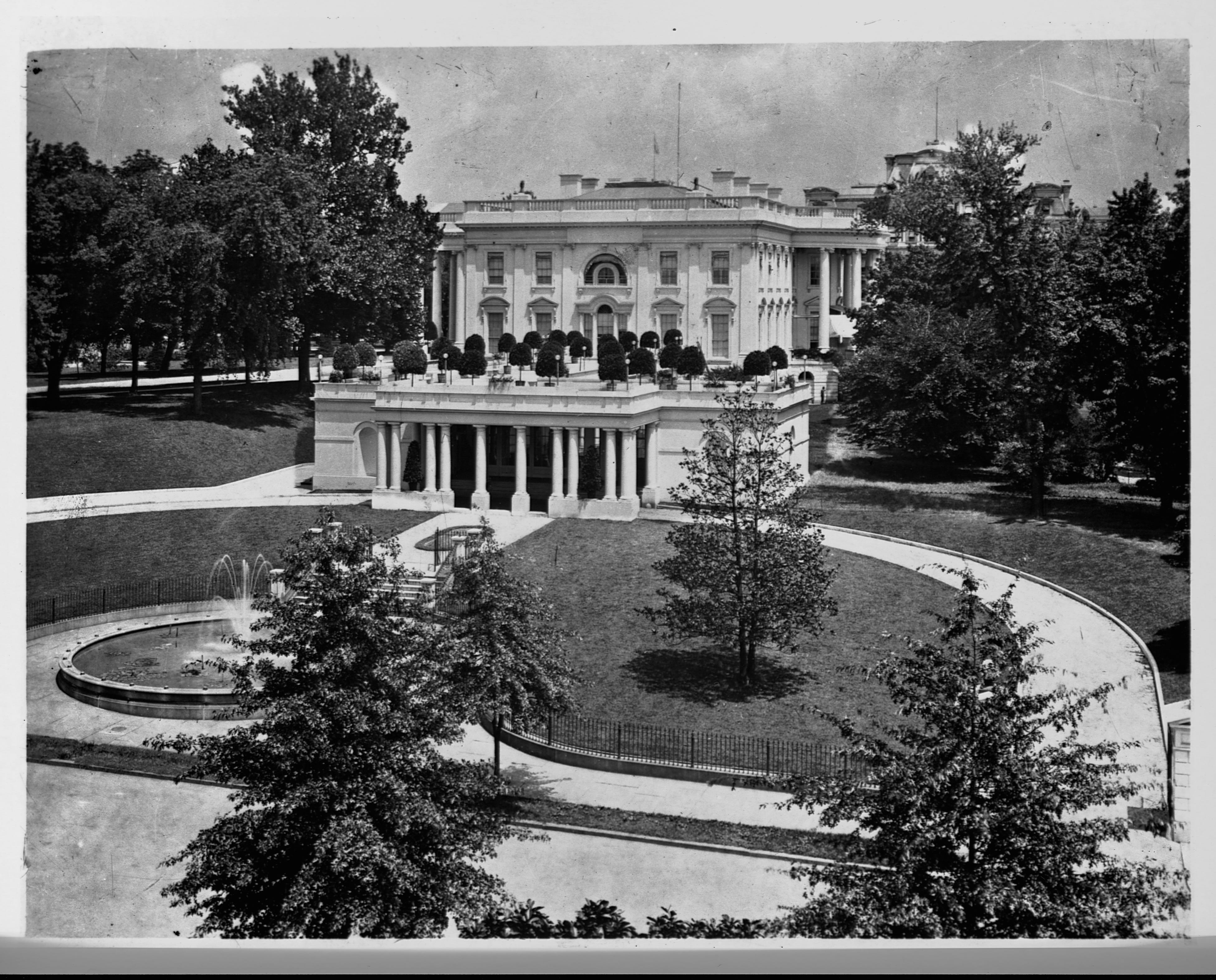
The original East Wing shortly after its completion in 1902

The first small East Wing (and the West Wing) was designed by Charles Follen McKim and built in 1902 during the Theodore Roosevelt renovations, as an entrance for formal and public visitors. This served mainly as an entrance for guests during large social gatherings, when it was necessary to accommodate many cars and carriages. Its primary feature was the long cloak room with spots for coats and hats of the ladies and gentlemen.

An expansion and remodeling of the East Wing was instituted in 1942, during Franklin D. Roosevelt's presidency. The two-story East Wing was designed by White House architect Lorenzo Winslow and added to the White House primarily to cover the construction of an underground bunker, the Presidential Emergency Operations Center (PEOC). Around the same time, Theodore Roosevelt's coatroom was integrated into the new building and became the White House Family Theater.

=== Operation ===
Floor plan of the White House with the East Wing on the right from 1942 until October 2025

The East Wing served as office space for the first lady and her staff, including the White House Social Secretary, correspondence staff, and the White House Graphics and Calligraphy Office, all of which have been relocated until the new East Wing is completed.

First Lady Rosalynn Carter, in 1977, was the first to keep her own office in the East Wing. The social office prepares all of the invitations and written correspondence for every event held at the White House.

Social and touring visitors to the White House usually entered through the East Wing's Visitors Office, continuing through the wood-paneled lobby, where portraits of presidents and first ladies hung. They continued through the Garden Room and along the East Colonnade, which had a view of the Jacqueline Kennedy Garden, past the theater to the Visitors' Foyer, and then on to the residence with entry made at the ground floor.

According to Anita McBride, former Chief of Staff to the First Lady under Laura Bush, "Betty Ford had the best quote for how special the East Wing is: 'If the West Wing is the mind of the nation, then the East Wing is the heart.'"

=== Demolition and new construction ===
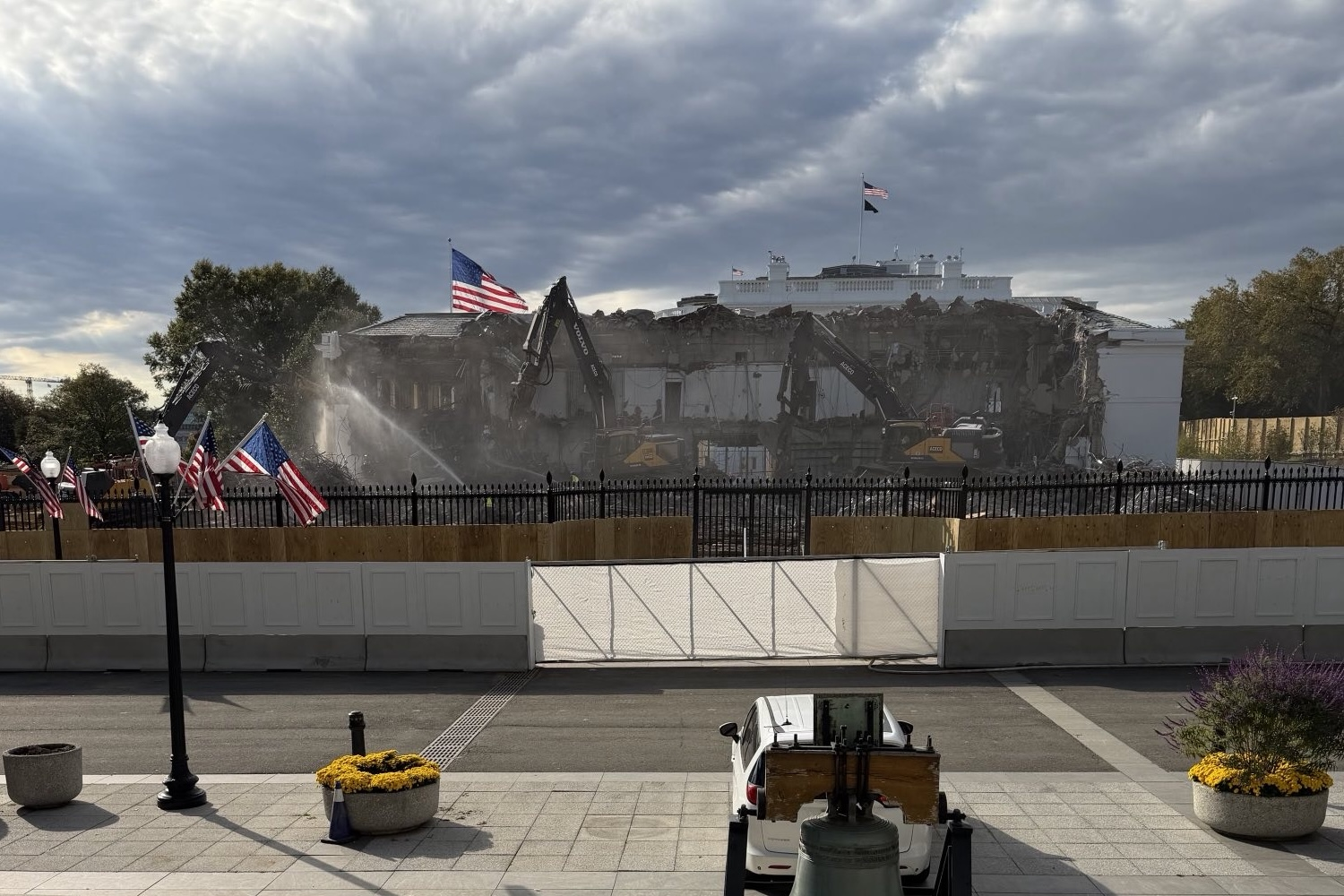
Demolition of the East Wing on October 21, 2025

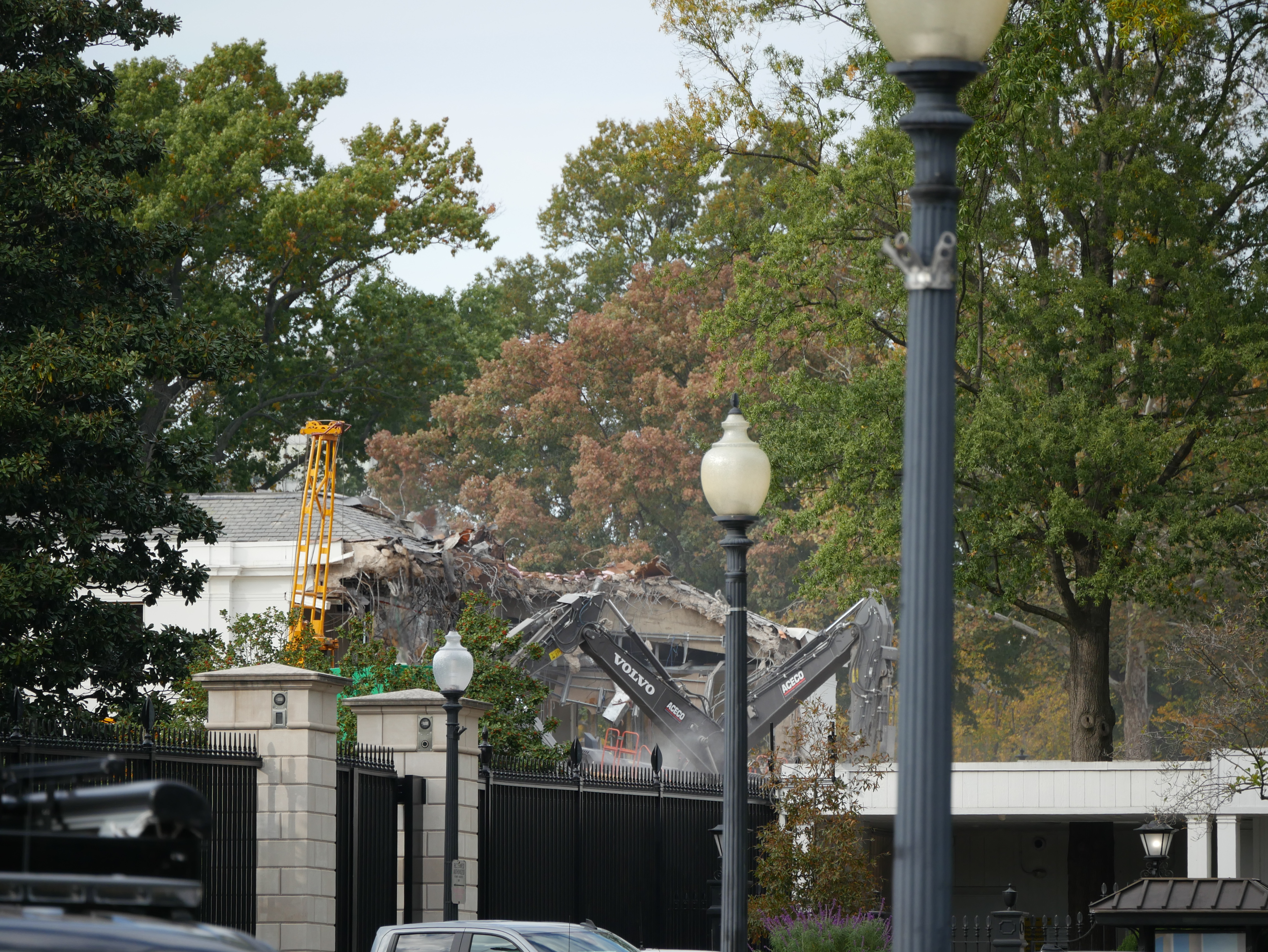
Another view of the demolition on October 22, 2025

An interpretation of the planned new East Wing based on a model from October 2025, laid over the old East Wing demolished that month

In July 2025, the White House released renderings of the planned White House State Ballroom. Initially, the venue was expected to be able to host up to 650 people for events, but that capacity was later revised to 999 people. Clark Construction was awarded the $200 million contract, with work planned to begin in September 2025.

On July 31, President Donald Trump had said the new ballroom "won't interfere with the current building", wouldn't be "touching it", and would pay "total respect to the existing building, which I'm the biggest fan of." A year later, at a press conference, he said the White House had been "a shit house" in disrepair but, due to his improvements, was "tippy top now."

The White House curator and her staff removed, catalogued, and stored the East Wing's art and furnishings and worked with the White House Historical Association to document the demolition and to use 3D scanning technology to capture the East Wing in detail prior to the demolition.

The demolition of the East Wing began on October 20, without review by the National Capital Planning Commission, which oversees federal construction. On October 21, with unannounced demolition already underway, the National Trust for Historic Preservation objected that a 90,000-square-foot (8,400 m^{2}) ballroom would "overwhelm" the 55,000-square-foot (5,100 m^{2}) White House and "permanently disrupt the carefully balanced classical design of the White House with its two smaller, and lower, East and West Wings."

On October 22, a White House official told NBC that the "entirety" of the East Wing would eventually be "modernized and rebuilt". The official claimed that the construction plan had never been firm: "The scope and the size of the ballroom project have always been subject to vary as the process develops."

Later on October 22, Trump told reporters during an Oval Office event, "We determined that after really a tremendous amount of study with some of the best architects in the world, we determined that really knocking it down, trying to use a little section, you know, the East Wing was not much. It was not much left from the original" and "In order to do it properly, we had to take down the existing structure."

The next day, on October 23, photos from the Associated Press showed that the entire East Wing, including the East Colonnade and the White House Family Theater, had been demolished.

Tours of the White House, whose visitors normally entered through the East Wing, were discontinued in August and resumed on a limited scale in December, with visitors entering through the North Portico of the Executive Residence.

On November 10, Trump told Fox News that "I could've built the ballroom around it [the East Wing], but it would not have been—" He did not finish the sentence, later resuming: "I didn't want to sacrifice a great ballroom for an OK ballroom by leaving it [the East Wing] right smack in the middle."

In January 2026, a White House spokesman said that "an unstable colonnade, water leakage, mold contamination and other problems" made demolition and building a new structure "the lowest total cost ownership and most effective long-term strategy". Taxpayers would pay $1 billion under a Senate Judiciary Committee proposal in May 2026 to cover "above-ground and below-ground security features". An additional $400 million in private donations would be used, according to Trump, for the above-ground ballroom.

==== Reactions ====
The demolition of the East Wing drew criticism from politicians, historians, and White House alumni. Senate minority leader Chuck Schumer called the demolition a "vanity project", California governor Gavin Newsom compared the demolition to the perception of Trump's policies as "ripping apart the Constitution," while senator Elizabeth Warren criticized Trump for ignoring increasing living costs. Former White House official Elaine Kamarck condemned the demolition as "an abomination".

ACECO, the company in charge of the demolition, received many negative reviews. It took down its website and Instagram page.

In a Fox News interview on October 21, Press Secretary Karoline Leavitt characterized the criticism of the demolition as "fake outrage". At the suggestion of Jesse Watters, she attributed Democrats' attitude to "jealousy". She noted that state visits to the White House required outdoor, temporary encampments, which she claimed to be undignified. She noted that President Obama, for instance, hosted state dinners there for India, in 2009, and for Italy, in 2016.

A YouGov poll released on October 22 showed that the majority of polled Americans disapproved of the decision to demolish the East Wing, with 53% disapproving and only 24% approving. At least one lawsuit attempted to stop the demolition, with the National Trust for Historic Preservation suing the Trump administration for unlawful demolition. The National Trust accepted public comments on the proposed ballroom through the United States Commission of Fine Arts (CFA) until February 18 and the National Capital Planning Commission (NCPC) until March 4. In their lawsuit, the National Trust argued that the White House did not get the required permissions before the East Wing was demolished and should have filed plans with the NCPC before starting.

U.S. District Judge Richard J. Leon's decision said that the Trust raised the wrong legal arguments against the president, by claiming the Administrative Procedure Act as the basis for their lawsuit. Leon's decision also said that if the group brought a new lawsuit there would be a quick resolution of the matter. The National Trust has filed a second lawsuit, arguing that "the administration is violating the separation of powers by proceeding with the project without Congressional authorization" and has requested an order to pause construction until approvals are attained and Congress has endorsed the plans. On March 31, 2026, Judge Leon ordered a halt to construction of the ballroom, ruling that the Trump administration lacked authority to fund the project through private donations and requiring the administration to identify a law that allowed it to demolish the East Wing without congressional approval. He issued another ruling on April 16 to clarify this. However, the U.S. Court of Appeals for the D.C. Circuit allowed construction to resume until June 5.

In August of that year, the Court of Appeals panel ruled 2–1 to uphold the April ruling and preliminary injunction won by the National Trust for Historic Preservation, calling for a halt to all above-ground construction until Congressional authorization is received. The decision was set to take effect 14 days later. On August 14, the Trump administration appealed to the Supreme Court. Ahead of the injunction, The New York Times reported construction was proceeding "20 hours a day, 7 days a week" with a team of 250 workers in an effort to complete as much work as possible before the ruling took effect. Constitutional law professor Laurence Tribe described the strategy as attempting "to change the reality on the ground so that instead of preserving the status quo, those who rightly invoke the law against what he's doing are put in a position of having to undo something that is already a fait accompli". On August 21, the Supreme Court said that construction could continue while it considered the appeal. It ruled again on August 31 that construction could continue. Although the court did not say whether the construction was legal, it said that the NTHP lacked legal standing to challenge it.

== Gallery ==
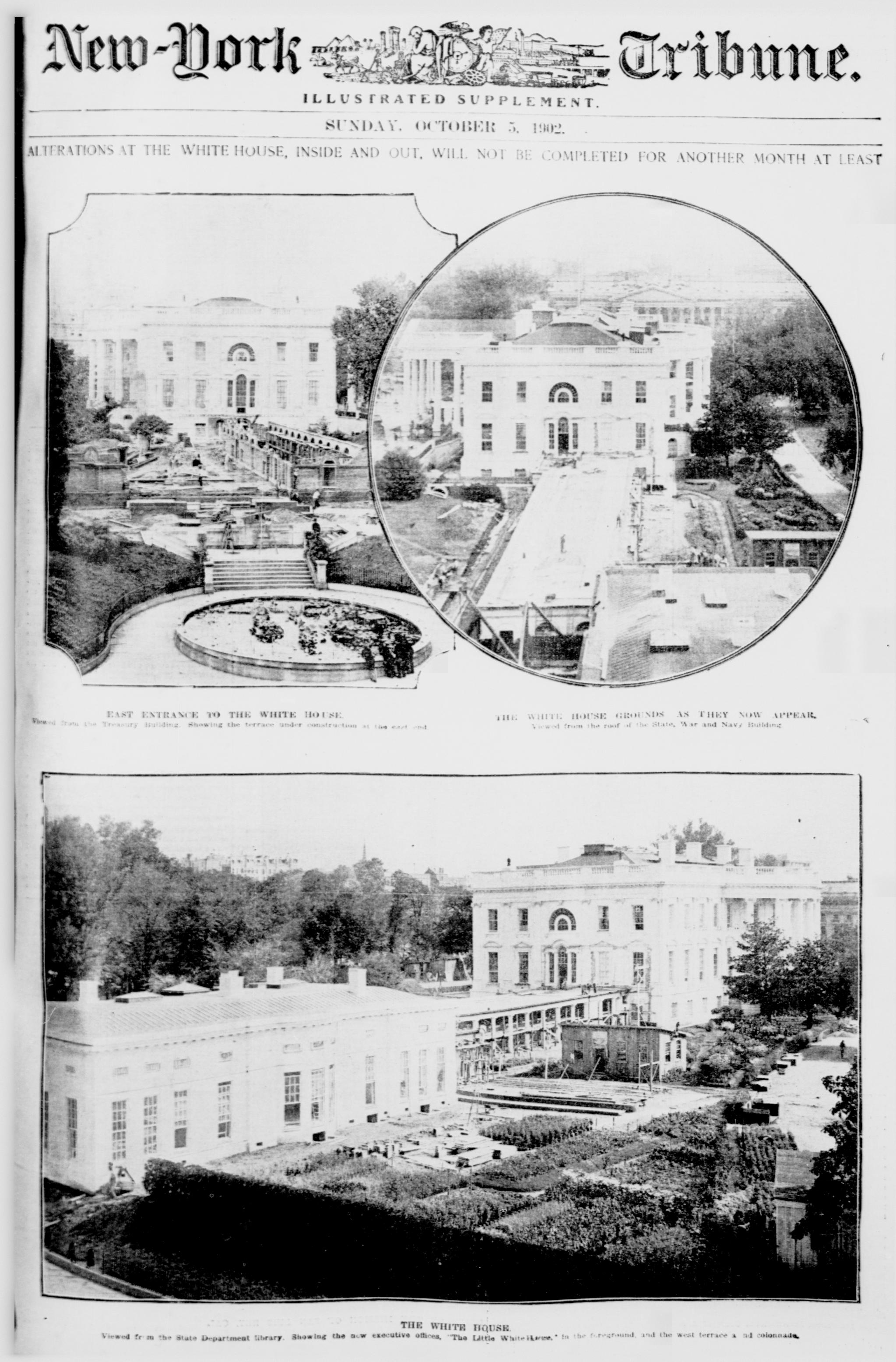
1902 New-York Tribune article about construction

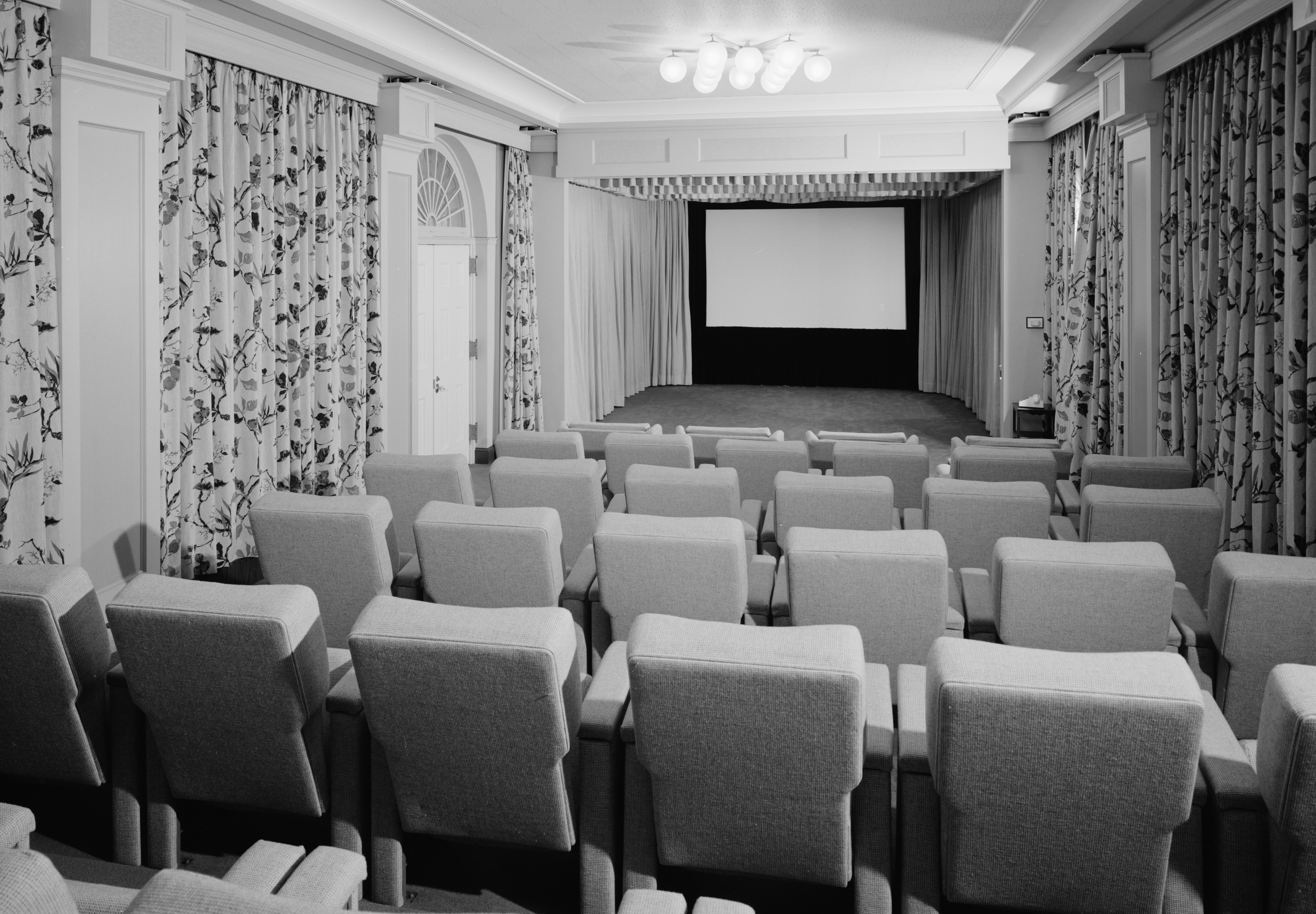
The East Wing movie theater in 1976

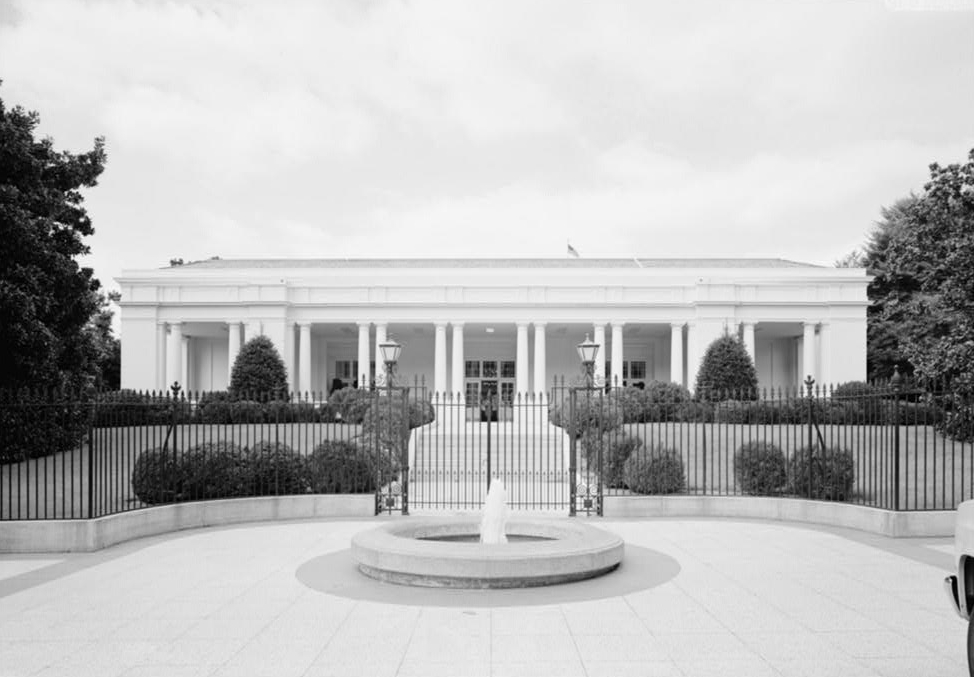
East Wing; view of East Elevation, circa 1985–1992

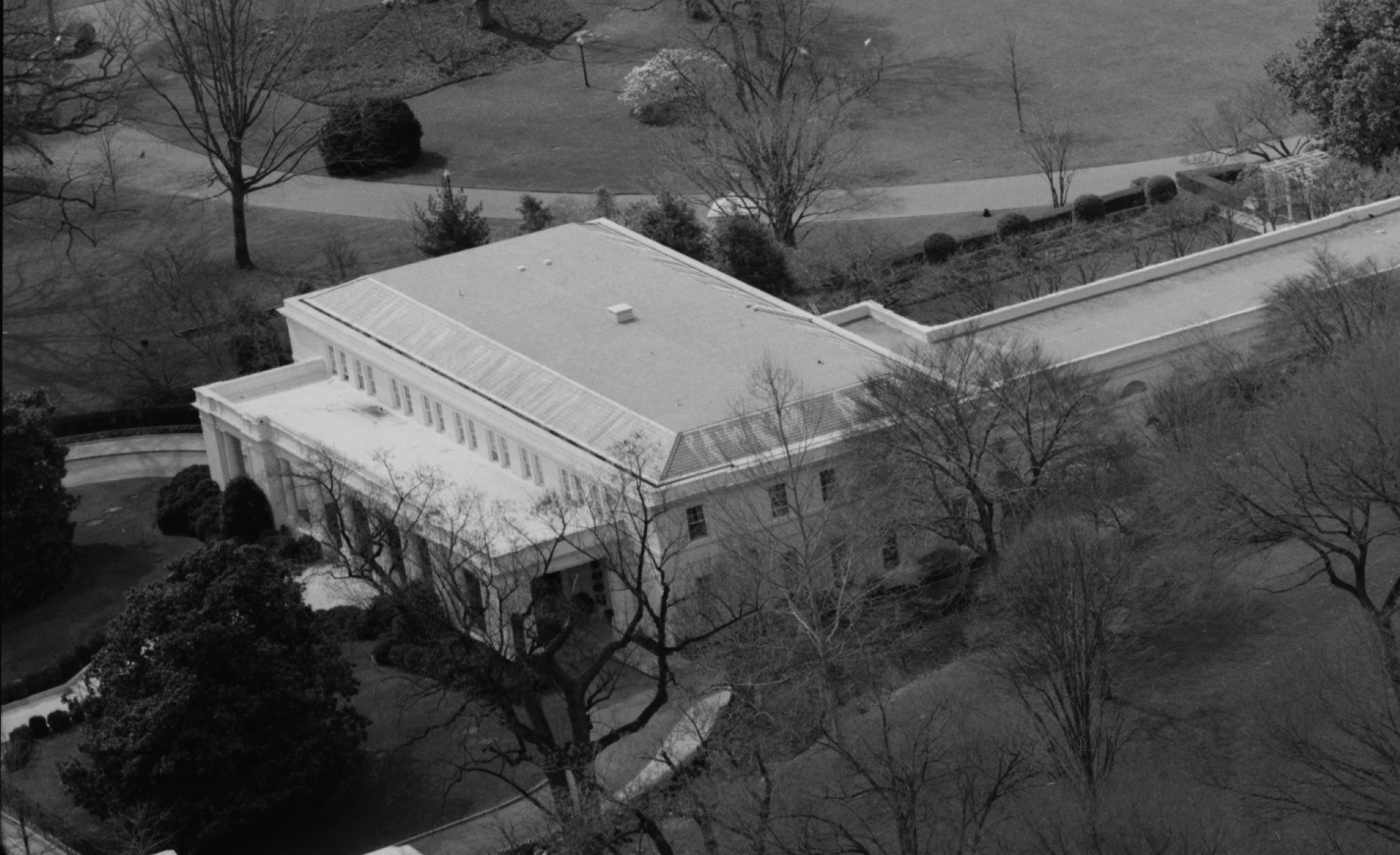
Aerial view from the northeast in 1992

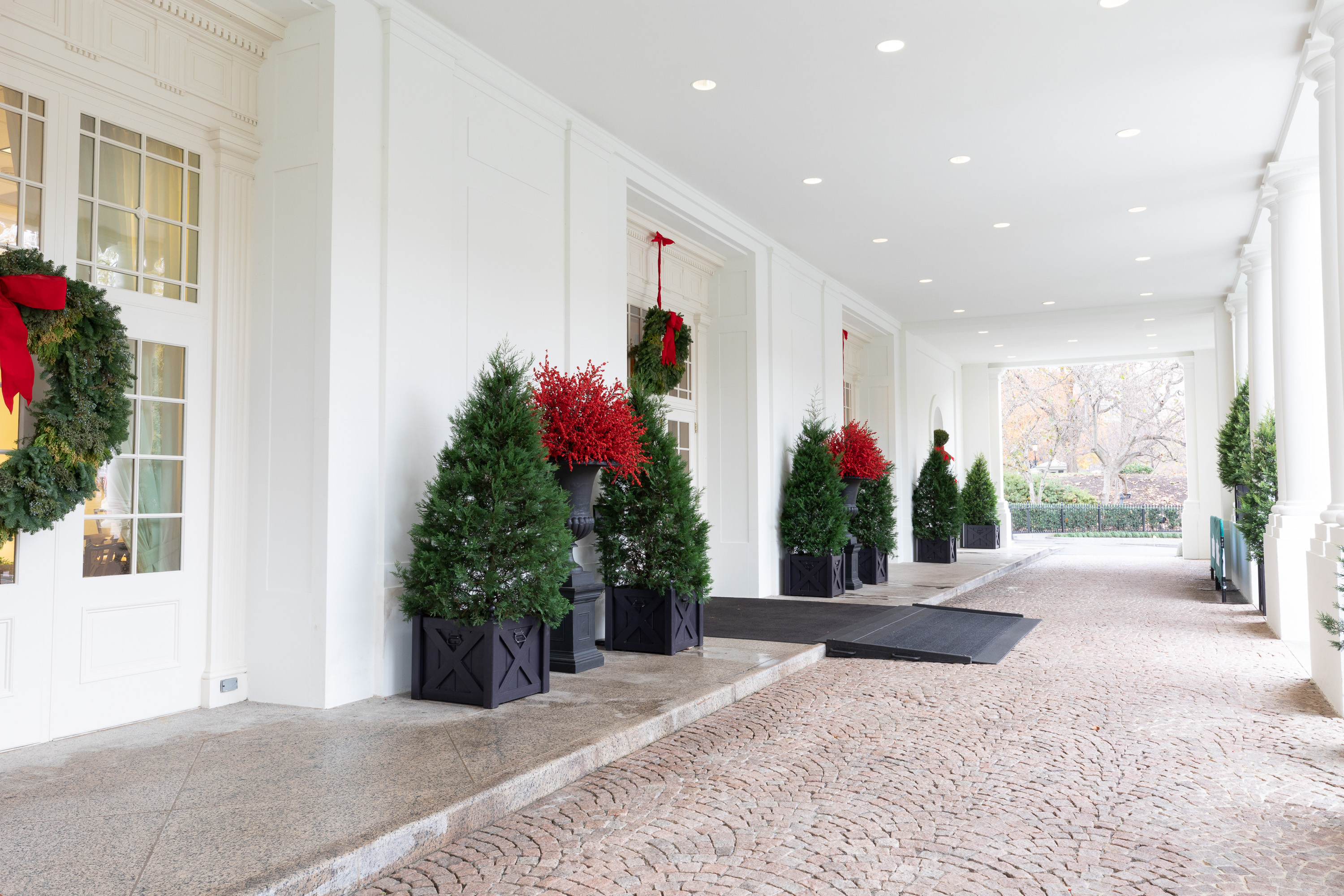
The East Wing entrance of the White House decorated for the holiday season, November 26, 2018

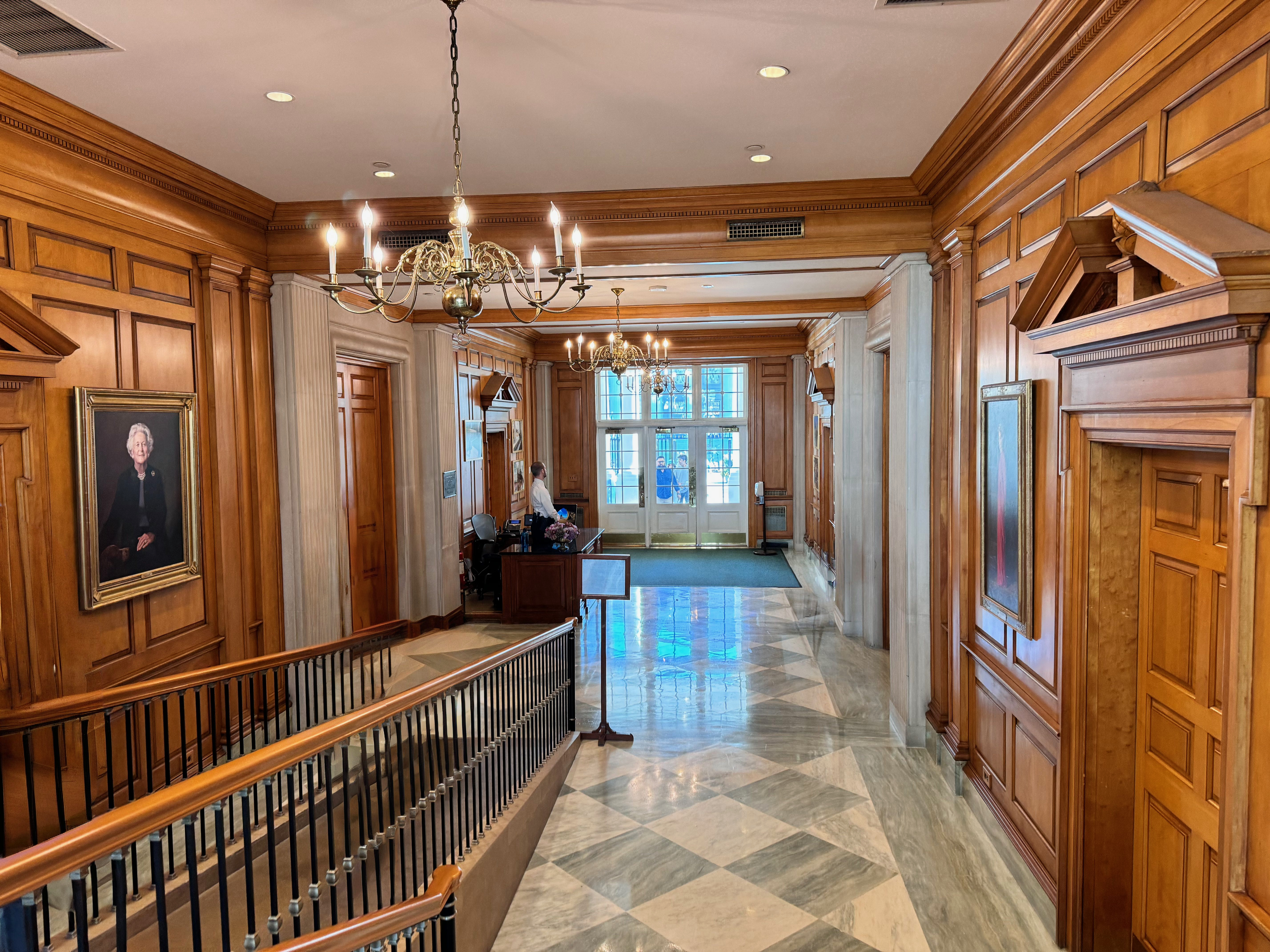
The East Wing lobby, 2023

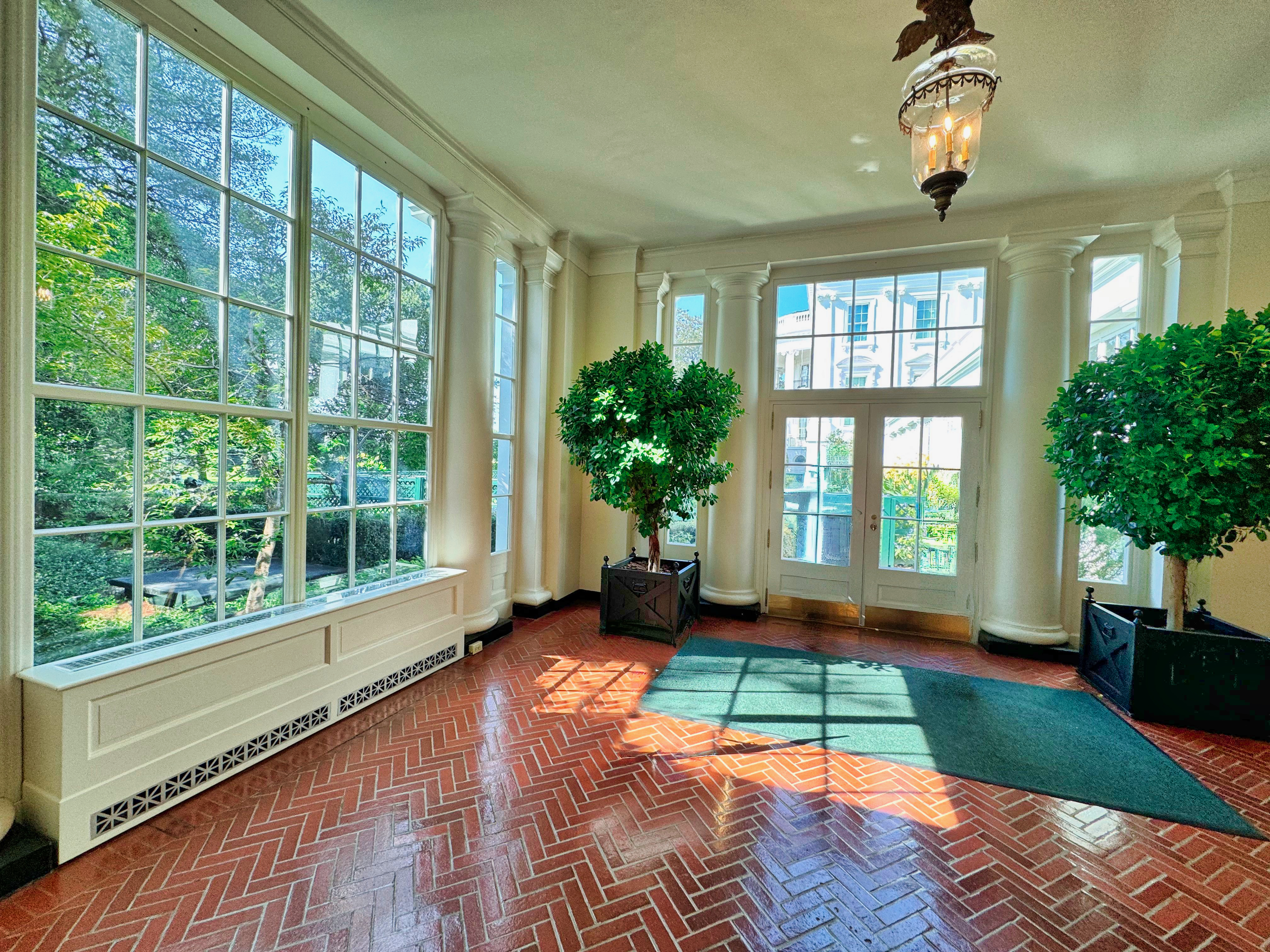
Garden Room, 2023
