= Uncharted (book) =

2025 non-fiction book by Chris Whipple

Uncharted: How Trump Beat Biden, Harris, and the Odds in the Wildest Campaign in History
- Author: Chris Whipple
- Publisher: Harper Influence
- Publication date: April 8, 2025
- ISBN: 978-0063386211
- Website: https://chriswhipple.com/uncharted

Uncharted: How Trump Beat Biden, Harris, and the Odds in the Wildest Campaign in History is a 2025 book by journalist Chris Whipple about the 2024 United States presidential election.

== Contents ==
Whipple told Politico that his information was on an "hour-by-hour, day-by-day basis" of the days leading up to Biden's withdrawal from the 2024 election. Whipple rejected the idea of a cover-up, instead believing that Biden and his colleagues had been in denial of the situation. Sources for the book include Ron Klain, Biden's former chief of staff, and Paul Manafort, an indicted criminal and a Republican, among others.

Whipple felt suspicious of Biden's staff after he sought an interview with Biden during his first two years and was only permitted for the interview to be conducted over email.

Later, Klain recounted the preparation for the 2024 Joe Biden–Donald Trump presidential debate, writing that Biden did not prepare properly but instead was consistently absentminded and unable to convey a strong argument for his campaign. Despite this performance, Klain disagreed with a withdrawal from the race. Later in the evening, Klain felt Biden was more concerned with his interaction with NATO leaders instead of domestic politics. Klain alleged that Biden was only attentive to foreign affairs due to his isolation from members of Congress his close aides had cultivated.

During two mock debates, he observed that Biden was consistently exhausted and indecisive on his campaign promises.

After the debate, when Biden attempted to improve his public image with a debate with George Stephanopoulos, Stephanopoulos replied to Whipple that the sitdown had been "heartbreaking up close".

== Reception ==
Fintan O'Toole of The New York Times praises the book's "vibrant detail" of the events unfolding within the Biden campaign, but raises some concerns regarding the bias of the book's sources such as Ron Klain and Paul Manafort. Lloyd Green of The Guardian similarly commends the "merciless detail" Whipple provides.

Richard Tofel in the Columbia Journalism Review criticizes the book's "unsatisfying conclusion" that Biden's decline had only been known to his family and physicians, comparing this assertion to the book Original Sin, which claimed that some staffers, cabinet members, and members congress were aware.

Klain reiterated to Politico that his criticisms were directed mostly to the Biden staffers who had enabled his disconnection with both the Democratic Party and any domestic concerns.
