= Age and health concerns about Joe Biden =

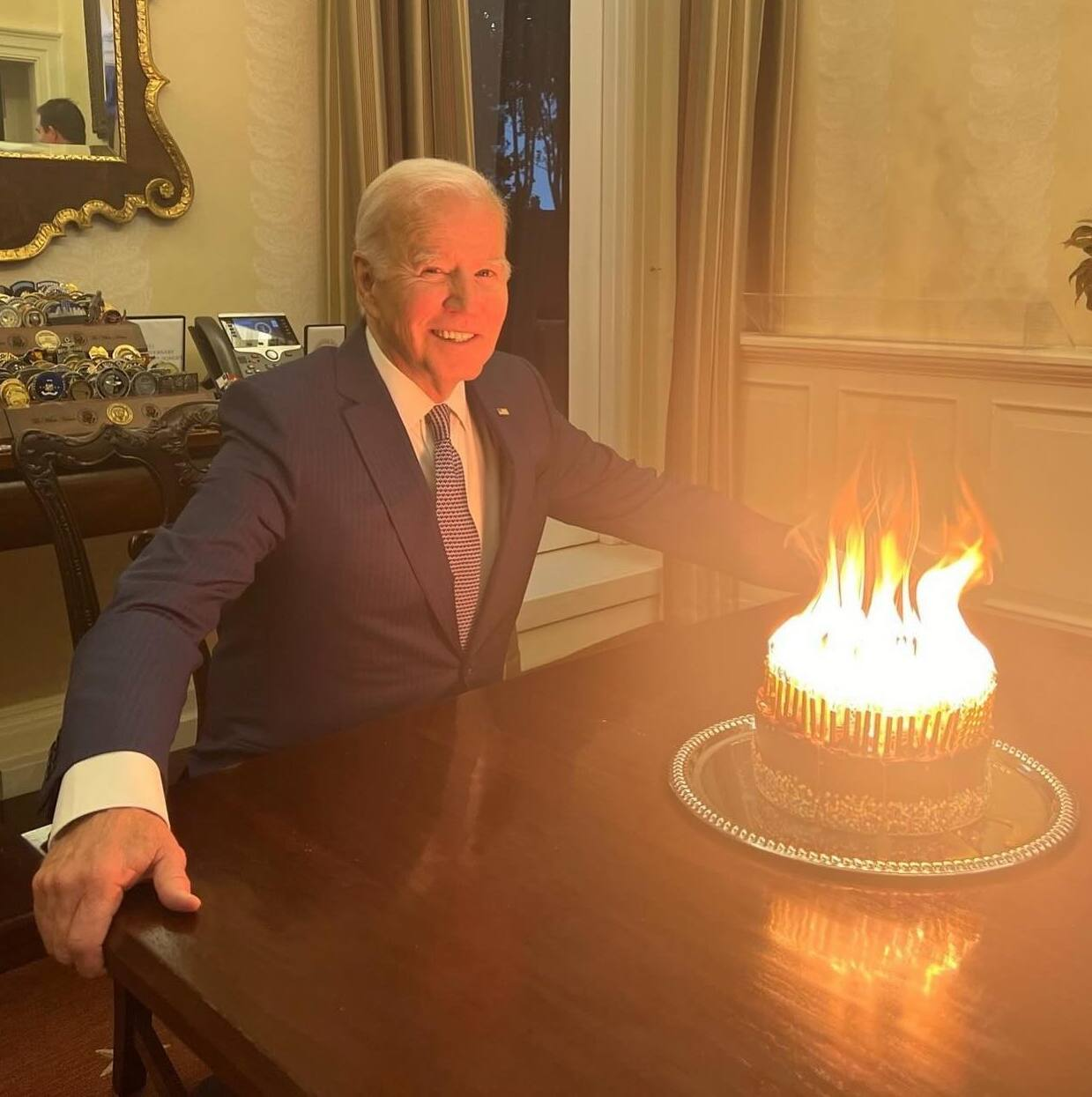
Biden on his 81st birthday (November 20, 2023)

Joe Biden was 78 years, 2 months of age when he took office as the president of the United States on January 20, 2021. At the time, he became both the oldest person to be inaugurated as U.S. president and the oldest sitting president in U.S. history. While Biden, a Democrat, campaigned for re-election in 2024, he suspended his campaign in July 2024 after being pressured to withdraw due to concerns about his age and mental acuity.

Before and during Biden's presidency, American voters and Biden's predecessor and successor as president, Donald Trump of the Republican Party, expressed concerns about Biden's health and fitness for office. These concerns led Dean Phillips, a member of the U.S. House of Representatives, to launch an unsuccessful Democratic primary challenge against Biden prior to the 2024 presidential election. In a February 2024 report by the U.S. Department of Justice, Robert Hur, a special counsel, opined that Biden's memory had "significant limitations"; the Biden administration dismissed the report as a "partisan hit job".

Concerns about Biden's age and health intensified following his faltering performance in the June 2024 presidential debate against Trump, leading many Democratic Party lawmakers to call for Biden to end his campaign. After initially stating that he would remain in the race, Biden ultimately withdrew on July 21, 2024; he immediately endorsed his vice president, Kamala Harris, to replace him as the party's presidential nominee. In the weeks and months following Biden's June 2024 debate against Trump, media outlets reported on efforts that had been made to manage and conceal Biden's age- and health-related limitations during his presidency. Harris went on to lose to Trump in the general election.

At the time his term as president ended on January 20, 2025, Biden was 82 years and 2 months old. He was diagnosed with prostate cancer in May 2025.

== Background ==
In February 1988, Biden (who was then a member of the U.S. Senate), after experiencing numerous episodes of increasingly severe neck pain, underwent surgery to correct a leaking intracranial berry aneurysm. While recuperating, he suffered a pulmonary embolism, a serious complication. After a second aneurysm was surgically repaired in May of that year, Biden's recuperation kept him away from the Senate for seven months.

In 2018, when Biden was considering running for president, he consulted with friends, aides, and longtime supporters as to whether he was too old to run for the presidency. By 2019, The New York Times, The Washington Post, Politico, CNN, The Atlantic, the Associated Press, and Slate all published articles on Biden's age and fitness for office. That year, in advance of the 2020 presidential election, some Democratic Party candidates for president attempted to use the then-76-year-old Biden's age against him. Many of his supporters criticized this campaign rhetoric, calling it ageist. Before and during Biden's 2020 presidential campaign, Biden was followed by rumors that he had undergone plastic surgery to appear younger. Writer Olivia Nuzzi reported in 2019 that Biden's alleged cosmetic procedures were "a minor obsession" of the Trump administration.

== 2020 presidential election ==
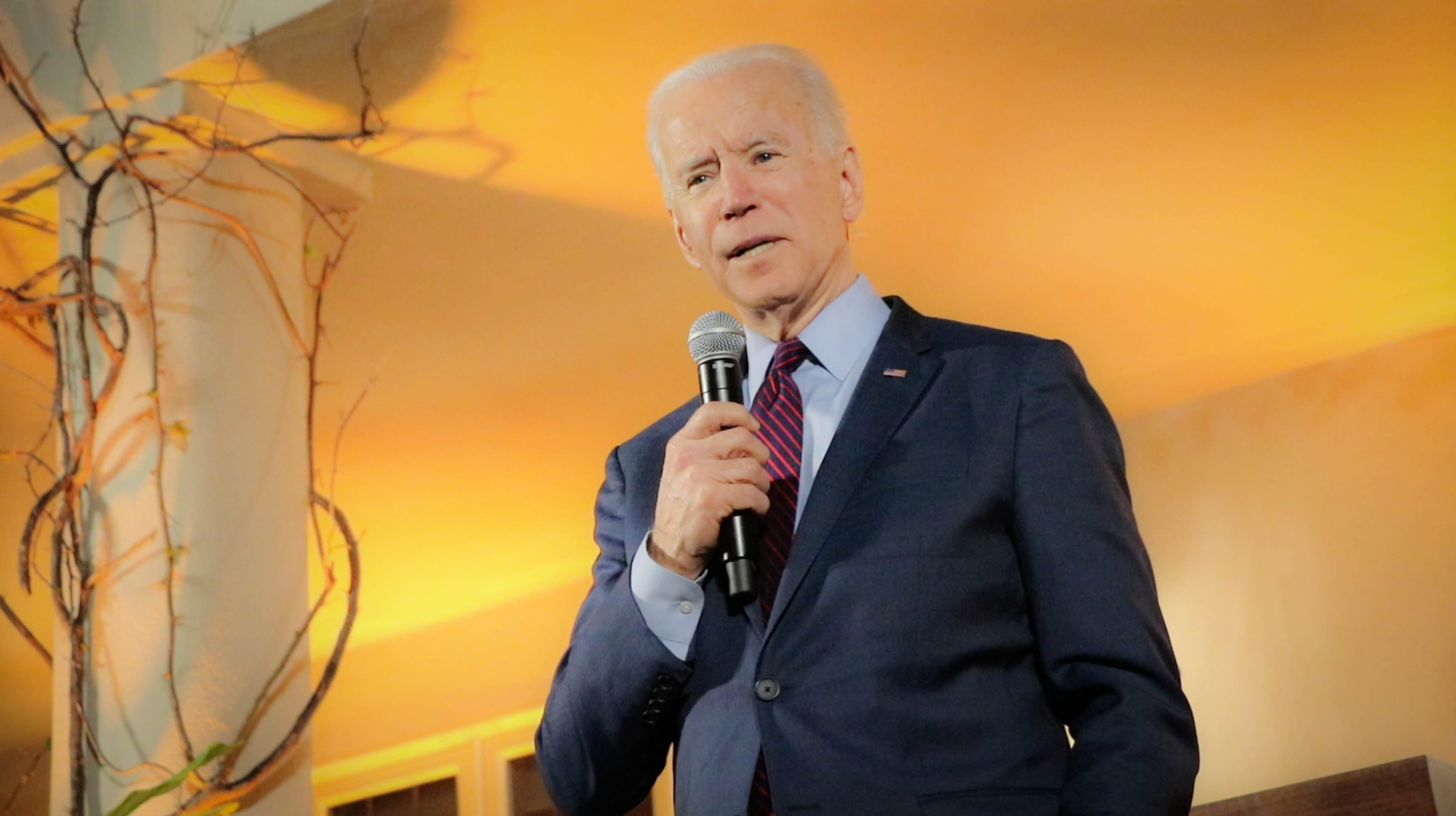
Biden campaigning for president in March 2020

In April 2019, Biden announced his entry into the 2020 Democratic Party presidential primaries. Throughout the primaries, other Democratic candidates, primary voters, and journalists raised concerns surrounding Biden's age and mental acuity, viewing the issues as a potential detriment to his electability. At the time of his announcement, Biden was 76 years old. Some of the age-related concerns were easily dismissed as his main opponent for the nomination, Senator Bernie Sanders, was 77 years old, making him older than Biden. Nevertheless, Biden faced age-based criticisms due to lackluster debate performances and frequent gaffes. In a June 2019 debate, Representative Eric Swalwell stated that Biden should "pass the torch" to younger candidates. In a September 2019 debate, former Secretary of Housing and Urban Development Julian Castro accused Biden of forgetting something he had said a few minutes earlier. Senator Cory Booker came to Castro's defense for his criticism of Biden at the debate. In March 2020, campaigning with Booker, Kamala Harris and the governor of Michigan, Gretchen Whitmer, Biden said, "I view myself as a bridge, not as anything else. There's an entire generation of leaders you saw stand behind me. They are the future of this country."

At a March 2, 2020, campaign event, Biden unsuccessfully attempted to quote from the U.S. Declaration of Independence, saying, "We hold these truths to be self-evident. All men and women created by—you know, you know, the thing". At other points during his 2020 presidential campaign, Biden mistakenly stated that he was running for the Senate.

During the general election campaign, Biden again faced age and acuity-related criticisms and was consistently attacked by his Republican opponent, Donald Trump, on those issues. Biden was also criticized for limiting his public appearances due to the COVID-19 pandemic, with Trump accusing him of "hiding in the basement". Furthermore, Trump and his campaign would often react to Biden's gaffes by making unproven claims that he was suffering from dementia and by calling him "Sleepy Joe" at rallies.

According to ABC News, the president of Russia, Vladimir Putin, and the Russian government spread disinformation about Biden's mental health during the 2020 presidential campaign. The U.S. Department of Homeland Security reportedly withheld publication of a bulletin warning law enforcement agencies about this campaign.

== Presidency (2021–2025) ==
Biden was 78 years, 61 days of age when he was inaugurated as president of the United States on January 20, 2021. At that time, he became the oldest person to assume the presidency and the oldest sitting president in U.S. history. Biden also became the first president to turn 80 years old while in office.

During Biden's presidency, Trump and right-wing media outlets continued to make claims of dementia and cognitive decline regarding Biden. The Biden administration routinely aimed to make light of the president's age by poking fun and joking about it in a manner similar to the way in which President Ronald Reagan responded to age-related concerns. When used by the Biden administration, this approach was met with both praise and mockery. The Biden administration was criticized for allegedly gaslighting or harassing journalists who asked questions about Biden's health or age.

Various events occurring during Biden's presidency highlighted concerns regarding his age and health.

=== 2021–2022 ===
In November 2021, Politico reported on a recent poll showing that American voters had "increasing doubts about the health and mental fitness of President Joe Biden". The poll showed that 48% of voters disagreed with the assertion that Biden was mentally fit. The report noted that voters' perceptions of Biden's physical and mental health had shifted dramatically since late 2020.

At the 2022 White House Easter Egg Roll, Biden was interrupted and directed away from reporters by a White House staffer dressed as the Easter Bunny. Video of the Easter Bunny incident went viral; it was viewed more than five million times. "Why is the Easter Bunny directing the President of the United States?", Republican senator Josh Hawley's press secretary Abigail Marone asked on Twitter.

The possibility of a 2024 Biden re-election bid led David Axelrod, a former senior advisor to President Barack Obama, to make the following comments to The New York Times in June 2022: "The presidency is a monstrously taxing job and the stark reality is the president would be closer to 90 than 80 at the end of a second term, and that would be a major issue."

Biden fell off his bicycle near his beach house in Delaware on June 18, 2022.

In the summer of 2022, a New York Times–Siena College poll found that 61% of Democratic voters wanted someone other than Biden to be the 2024 presidential nominee, citing his age as the main concern. Biden's aides dismissed age-related concerns as politically motivated attacks by Republicans.

As early as 2022, Democratic political consultant James Carville, Mark Leibovich of The Atlantic, Michelle Goldberg, Maureen Dowd and Ezra Klein of The New York Times, and The Economist opined that Biden should not run for re-election.

At a July 2022 event, Biden read instructions from his teleprompter aloud. He said, "It is noteworthy that the percentage of women who register to vote and cast a ballot is consistently higher than the percentage of the men who do so—end of quote, repeat the line. Women are not without electoral and, or, political—let me be precise: not and, or—or political power". The blunder led social media users to question Biden's mental fitness.

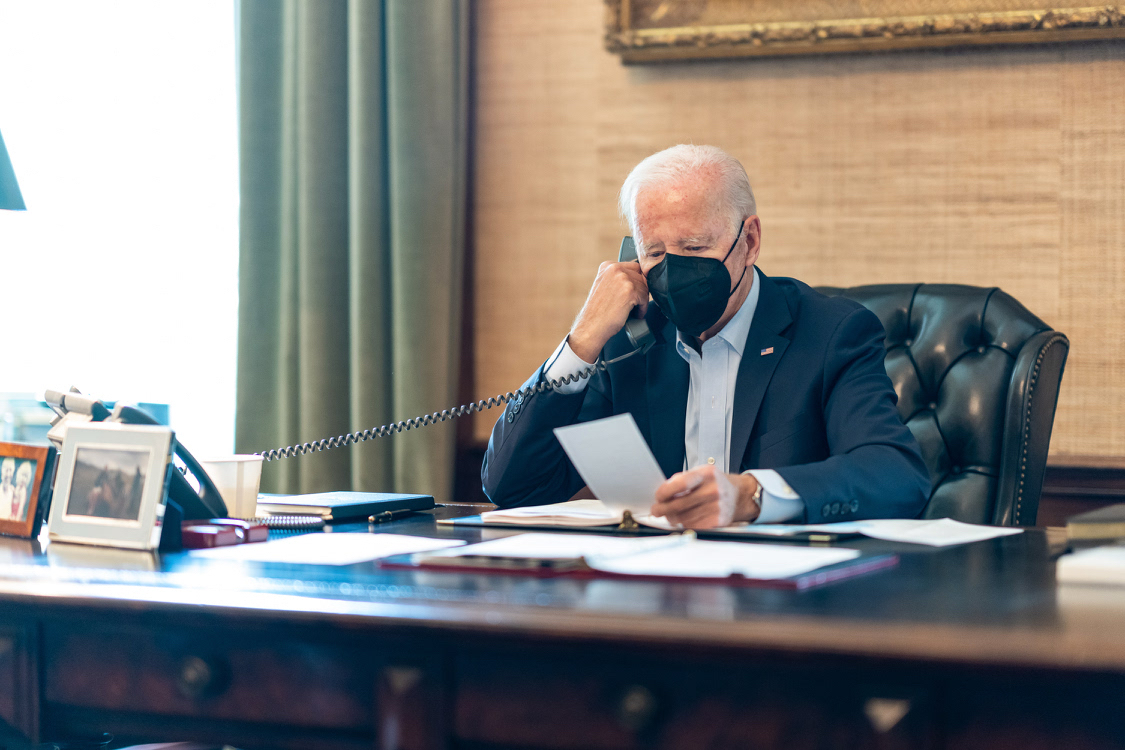
Biden working after contracting COVID-19, July 22, 2022

Biden tested positive for COVID-19 in July 2022, experiencing mild symptoms.

On July 28, 2022, U.S. Representative Dean Phillips became the first incumbent Democratic member of the U.S. Congress to say that Biden should not run for re-election. Phillips called for "generational change," citing Biden's age.

While speaking at a September 28, 2022 event, Biden asked whether Representative Jackie Walorski was in attendance. Walorski had died in a car accident the previous month. The incident raised questions about Biden's mental sharpness.

At an October 2022 rally, Biden mistakenly asserted that he had campaigned in 54 U.S. states (there are only 50) in support of the Affordable Care Act. The gaffe went viral and raised questions about Biden's mental acuity.

On October 10, 2022, U.S. Representative Tim Ryan stated at a televised Ohio Senate debate with JD Vance that he did not believe Biden should run for re-election in 2024 and would like to see a generational change.

=== 2023 ===
In 2023, Democratic National Committee officials reportedly staged "hush-hush talks" to plan for contingencies in the event of Biden's withdrawal from the 2024 presidential race.

In 2023, Biden began to use a CPAP (continuous positive airway pressure) machine to help deal with a sleep apnea condition that he has, and to improve the quality of his sleep.

In February 2023, a biopsy was done on a lesion on Biden's chest. The lesion was confirmed to be basal-cell carcinoma and was successfully removed.

On April 25, 2023, Biden announced that he would seek re-election to the presidency in 2024.

Biden tripped and fell onstage at the U.S. Air Force Academy graduation on June 1, 2023.

Biden left listeners confused when he ended a June 2023 speech to gun control advocates in Connecticut by saying, "God save the Queen, man". Queen Elizabeth II had died the previous September. White House staff stated that Biden was responding to a person in the crowd.

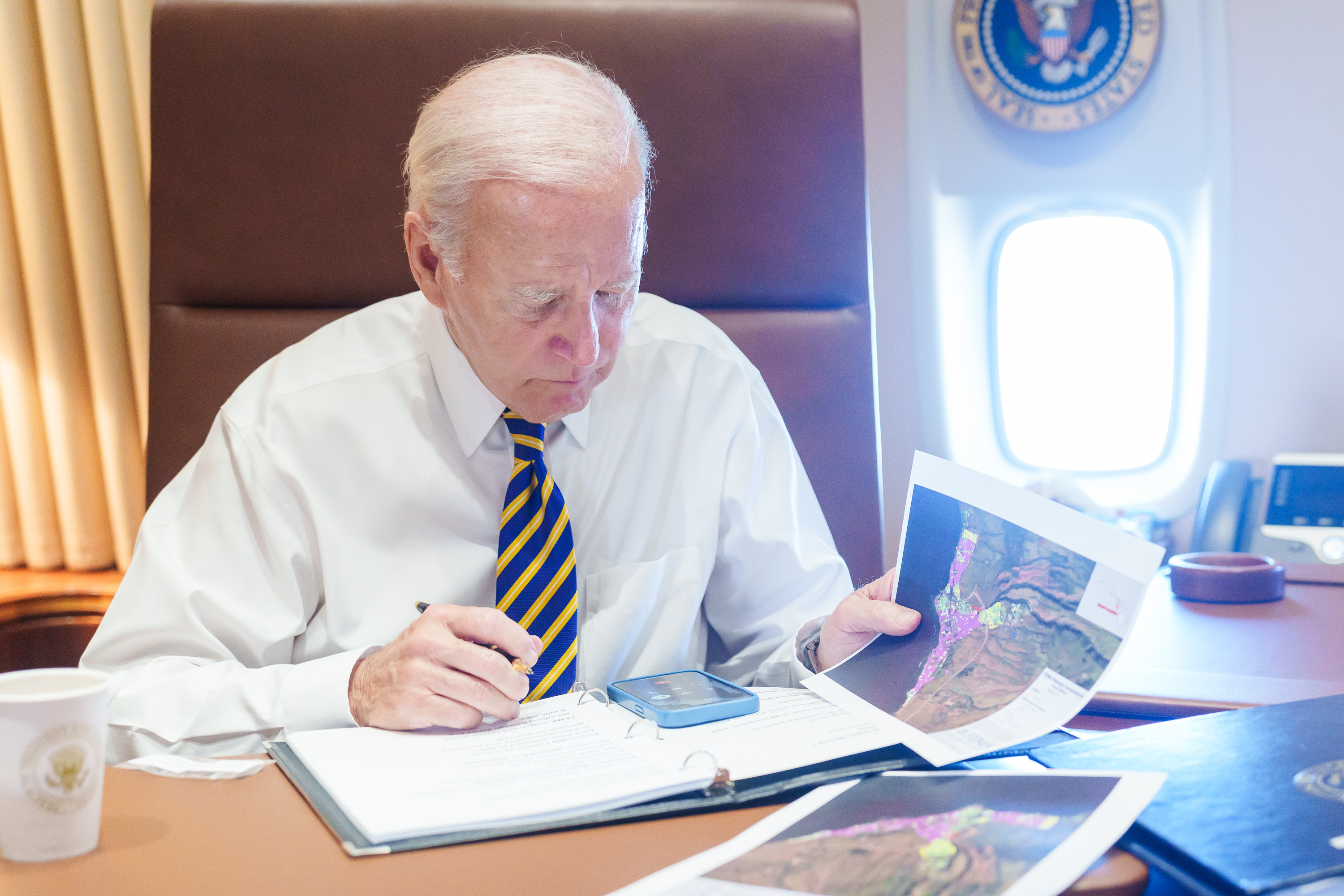
Biden reviews maps of structural damage assessments made by the Federal Emergency Management Agency responding to the 2023 Hawaii wildfires.

At a September 2023 press conference in Vietnam, Biden said, "I don't know about you, but I'm going to go to bed". Moments later, White House Press Secretary Karine Jean-Pierre interrupted a rambling Biden and declared that the press conference was over. The incident raised questions about Biden's fitness.

A September 2023 CNN poll showed that "more than half (56 percent) of Democrats—and nearly three-quarters of Americans (73 percent) said they were seriously concerned for Biden's physical and mental competence".

On July 7, 2023, political scientist Eliot A. Cohen praised Biden but said he should not seek re-election. On September 12, 2023, David Ignatius, a columnist for The Washington Post, opined that Biden should not run for re-election. On September 13, 2023, during the Morning Joe show where Ignatius made a guest appearance, MSNBC pundit Joe Scarborough said that every Democrat he had spoken to privately believed President Biden was too old to run for re-election.

Biden told the same story twice at a September 2023 fundraiser, raising questions about his mental capacity.

On September 29, 2023, comedian Bill Maher focused on Biden's age and called for Biden to end his re-election campaign during his New Rule segment of the Real Time with Bill Maher show. Maher said, "Someone has to convince President Biden that if he runs again, he's going to turn the country back over to Trump and go down in history as Ruth Bader Biden, the person who doesn't know when to quit and so does great damage to their party and their country".

On October 27, 2023, Democratic Representative Dean Phillips formally launched his 2024 presidential campaign. Phillips campaigned as a younger alternative to Biden, arguing that Biden would be a weak general election candidate due to his age and low approval ratings. In public, Phillips was ridiculed. In private, others in the Democratic Party shared his concerns. On the same day, staff writer for The Atlantic Mark Leibovich made the case for a primary challenge: "Many voters viewed Biden's candidacy in 2020 as a one-term proposition. He suggested as much. 'Look, I view myself as a bridge, not as anything else,' Biden said nearly three years ago at a campaign event in Michigan, where he appeared with Harris, Booker, and Whitmer. 'There's an entire generation of leaders you saw stand behind me. They are the future of this country.' Some mischief-maker should give Democrats a path to that future starting now. Voters bought the bridge in 2020. But when does it become a bridge too far?"

In an October 2023 interview, Mike Johnson, the Republican Speaker of the U.S. House of Representatives, was asked whether he believed Biden was experiencing cognitive decline. Johnson answered, "I do, I think most of us do. That's reality. It's not a personal slight to him, it has to do with age and acumen, and everyone's different. Everyone ages differently. Clearly, if you look at a tape of Joe Biden making an argument in the Senate Judiciary Committee a few years ago, and you see a speech that he delivers now, there's a difference".

On his 81st birthday on November 20, 2023, Biden posted an image of a birthday cake with dozens of candles and a caption joking that it was his "146th birthday". The photo brought to the surface concerns among the public about Biden's age according to a majority of those polled at the time.

In late 2023, former Speaker of the New Hampshire House of Representatives Steve Shurtleff and businessman Mike Novogratz—both past Biden supporters—each announced that they would not support Biden's re-election bid due to age concerns.

=== 2024 ===
In January 2024, Jay Olshansky gave Biden a nearly 75% chance of living through a second term based on publicly available information about his health.

In a January 2024 interview, Democratic Representative Dean Phillips told Axios that he thought it would be "impossible" for Biden to be president for four more years, and that "at that stage of life, it is impossible ultimately to conduct, to prosecute the office of the American presidency in the way that this country in the world needs right now." On January 23, 2024, Phillips won 19.6% of the vote in the 2024 New Hampshire Democratic presidential primary.

On January 29, 2024, The Hill published a report entitled "Watch: Biden mumbles incoherently during speech at brewery, 74% say Joe is too old".

In late January or early February 2024, Larry Sabato, director of the Center for Politics at the University of Virginia, received a call from a Democratic senator wherein the senator reportedly said, "You do realise, off the record, that Joe Biden is not going to be our nominee? I just was at a meeting with him with several other senators and he couldn't even function. We can't run him".

Upon concluding an investigation into Biden's handling of classified documents, special counsel Robert Hur suggested that Biden would be able to present himself to a jury as a "sympathetic, well-meaning, elderly man with a poor memory". Based on his interview of Biden, Hur added that Biden's memory "appeared to have significant limitations". White House lawyers disputed this characterization, in addition, Vice President Kamala Harris said that the report was "politically motivated". Biden rejected Hur's claim in a televised press conference on the day the special counsel's report was released; during the conference, he referred to Egyptian President Abdel Fattah el-Sisi as the president of Mexico.

Liberal commentators and Democratic officials accused Hur of partisanship and of including unnecessary detail in his report. Dean Phillips asserted that the report "simply affirms what most Americans already know and all but handed the 2024 election to Donald Trump" if Biden were to become the Democratic presidential nominee. Senator Rick Scott called for Biden to be removed from the presidency under the Twenty-fifth Amendment to the U.S. Constitution, arguing that the report "does not describe someone who should be the Commander in Chief of our armed forces and the defender of American freedoms". The Republican-led House Judiciary Committee and House Oversight Committee issued subpoenas for the full audio recordings of Biden's interviews with Hur. A transcript had already been released to the committees. The White House withheld the recordings, accusing the Republicans of wishing to distort the audio for political gain.

In February 2024, former Representative David Skaggs wrote that he was voting uncommitted so that Democrats could have an open convention. He wrote that Biden "should step aside...and open the race to several worthy Democrats who then would run. In that way, he can preserve the splendid legacy he has earned, and avoid the embarrassment he doesn't deserve." That same month, Ezra Klein made the case for an open convention so that Democrats could vote on a new nominee.

According to a February 2024 poll, Biden's age and health were major or moderate concerns for 86% of voters, up from 76% in 2020.

Information released by the White House about Biden's 2024 annual physical examination showed that he was in good health for a man of his age. Biden was on medication for non-valvular atrial fibrillation (a form of irregular heartbeat), was treated with positive airway pressure for obstructive sleep apnea, had a sensory peripheral neuropathy, and had a stiff gait due to spinal arthritis and the aftereffects of injury.

According to another 2024 poll, most voters who had voted for Biden in 2020 said they believed he was too old to be an effective president; The New York Times noted that these concerns "cut across generations, gender, race and education".

Phillips announced that he was withdrawing from the presidential race on March 6, 2024. On March 12, 2024, Biden amassed enough convention delegates to become the presumptive 2024 Democratic presidential nominee.

In a June 2024 interview, Biden's performance "raised concerns about his age". He confused Russian President Vladimir Putin with Chinese leader Xi Jinping and made several comments "that Time described as 'unintelligible' in the interview transcript".

==== June 2024 debate and aftermath ====
On June 27, 2024, Biden took part in a presidential debate against Donald Trump. Described as a disaster for Biden, the debate reinforced concerns about Biden's age. Biden appeared confused and disoriented during the debate's first half and gave meandering answers to questions.

Politico described Biden's performance as follows:

The alarm bells for Democrats started ringing the second Biden started speaking in a haltingly hoarse voice. Minutes into the debate, he struggled to mount an effective defense of the economy on his watch and flubbed the description of key health initiatives he's made central to his reelection bid... He repeatedly mixed up "billion" and "million," and found himself stuck for long stretches of the 90-minute debate playing defense.

And when he wasn't speaking, he stood frozen behind his podium, mouth agape, his eyes wide and unblinking for long stretches of time.

Reid Epstein of The New York Times wondered whether voters would see Biden as someone physically able to run the country, even if they preferred his policies to Trump's. Some Democrats opined that he should withdraw from the presidential race.

On June 28, 2024, Speaker of the House Mike Johnson said, "President Joe Biden's Cabinet should discuss invoking the 25th Amendment in the wake of a politically disastrous debate that compounded age and acuity questions." Republican Representatives Clay Higgins and Chip Roy also filed a resolution after the debate that asked Vice President Kamala Harris to convene the Cabinet and declare Biden unfit to carry out his duties as commander-in-chief under the Twenty-fifth Amendment.

Nate Silver, the founder of FiveThirtyEight, wrote: "If I lived in a swing state, I'd still vote for Biden—if for no other reason than because I think January 6 is so disqualifying to outweigh everything else. But an 86-year-old president would be disqualifying under any other circumstance".

Following the debate, former President Bill Clinton, former President Barack Obama, Vice President Harris, Senate Democratic Leader Chuck Schumer, and California Governor Gavin Newsom publicly defended Biden and supported his continued candidacy.

At a June 29, 2024 reception hosted by Phil Murphy, governor of New Jersey, Biden reportedly needed to have fluorescent tape fixed to the carpet to show him where to walk.

In a July 4 report, the Associated Press stated that Biden "is often sharp and focused. But he also has moments, particularly later in the evening, when his thoughts seem jumbled and he trails off mid-sentence or seems confused".

Biden was interviewed by George Stephanopoulos of ABC News on July 5, 2024. In the interview, he stated that he intended to stay in the 2024 presidential race. According to Politico, "members of Congress and top Democratic operatives" said that "the president was more energetic and forceful than he was on stage during last week's showdown with Donald Trump—but it likely won't be enough to tame the panic" concerning his campaign.

Many officials and foreign leaders who had encountered Biden in the months preceding the debate stated that he had been increasingly frail, tired, meandering, and confused in his speech. In many parts of Europe, this led to concern about the potential for a Biden defeat and a second Trump presidency.

Biden declined to undergo a cognitive exam such as the Montreal Cognitive Assessment, saying that he had "a cognitive test every single day" in performing his presidential duties. In early July, it was reported that a neurologist specializing in Parkinson's disease had met with Physician to the President Kevin O'Connor in 2024; O'Connor and the White House both said Biden was not being treated for the disease and that other officials also used O'Connor as their physician.

On July 8, 2024, The Wall Street Journal reported Biden's team had limited his schedule, personal interactions, media appearances, interviews, and unscripted exchanges in order to minimize concerns about his age and mental acuity. According to Newsweek, the Wall Street Journal report stated that Biden "was having 'good and bad days' as far back as 2021".

Democratic Representative Seth Moulton said he met Biden at the 80th anniversary of the Normandy landings and "For the first time, he didn't seem to recognize me. Of course, that can happen as anyone ages but, as I watched the disastrous debate a few weeks ago, I have to admit that what I saw in Normandy was part of a deeper problem." He said, "The president should bow out of the race."

On July 10, 2024, actor and Democratic fundraiser George Clooney published an op-ed in The New York Times calling on Biden to end his re-election campaign. In the op-ed, Clooney said, "I believe in [Biden]. Believe in his character. Believe in his morals. In the last four years, he's won many of the battles he's faced. But the one battle he cannot win is the fight against time".

On July 11, 2024, Democratic Representative Marie Gluesenkamp Perez suggested that Biden might not be capable of completing his term in office. In a statement, Gluesenkamp Perez said, "I doubt the president's judgment about his own health, his fitness to do the job, and whether he is the one making important decisions about our country, rather than unelected advisers."

At the July 2024 NATO summit, Biden mistakenly introduced Ukrainian President Volodymyr Zelenskyy as "President Putin". When it was Zelenskyy's turn to speak, Biden said: "And now I want to hand it over to the president of Ukraine, who has as much courage as he has determination. Ladies and gentlemen, President Putin". He then quickly corrected himself. (Vladimir Putin is the president of Russia, with whom Ukraine is at war.) Later at the same event, Biden confused his running mate with his opponent. When asked a question regarding Vice President Harris, he responded, "Look, I wouldn't have picked Vice President Trump to be vice president [if I didn't] think she was not qualified to be president".

On July 12, 2024, USA Today reported the following regarding Biden: "His walk is now a slow, stiff gait. His voice is softer, harder to hear. He has always spoken in tortured syntax, but his words now run together with alarming frequency. Thoughts repeatedly abandon him midsentence. President Joe Biden's advanced age and mental acuity—once a punchline for Republicans and late-night comics—are now at the center of a growing political crisis that has upended his reelection bid, threatening to bring his five-decade career to an abrupt close."

Biden then tested positive for COVID-19 on July 17, 2024. He experienced mild symptoms, including a cough, runny nose, and "general malaise". Images of Biden looking frail exiting from Air Force One on the way to isolation fueled further speculation on Biden's health.

A number of commentators and Democratic lawmakers called for Biden to withdraw from the 2024 presidential race. By July 19, 2024, more than 30 congressional Democrats had publicly called on Biden to end his presidential campaign. Many more had communicated the same message privately. On July 19, The Guardian reported that "after weeks of defiantly stating that he will remain the Democratic nominee, despite concerns about his age and mental acuity in the wake of last month's disastrous debate against Donald Trump", Biden was reportedly "reconsidering his position".

==== Suspension of 2024 presidential campaign and later developments ====
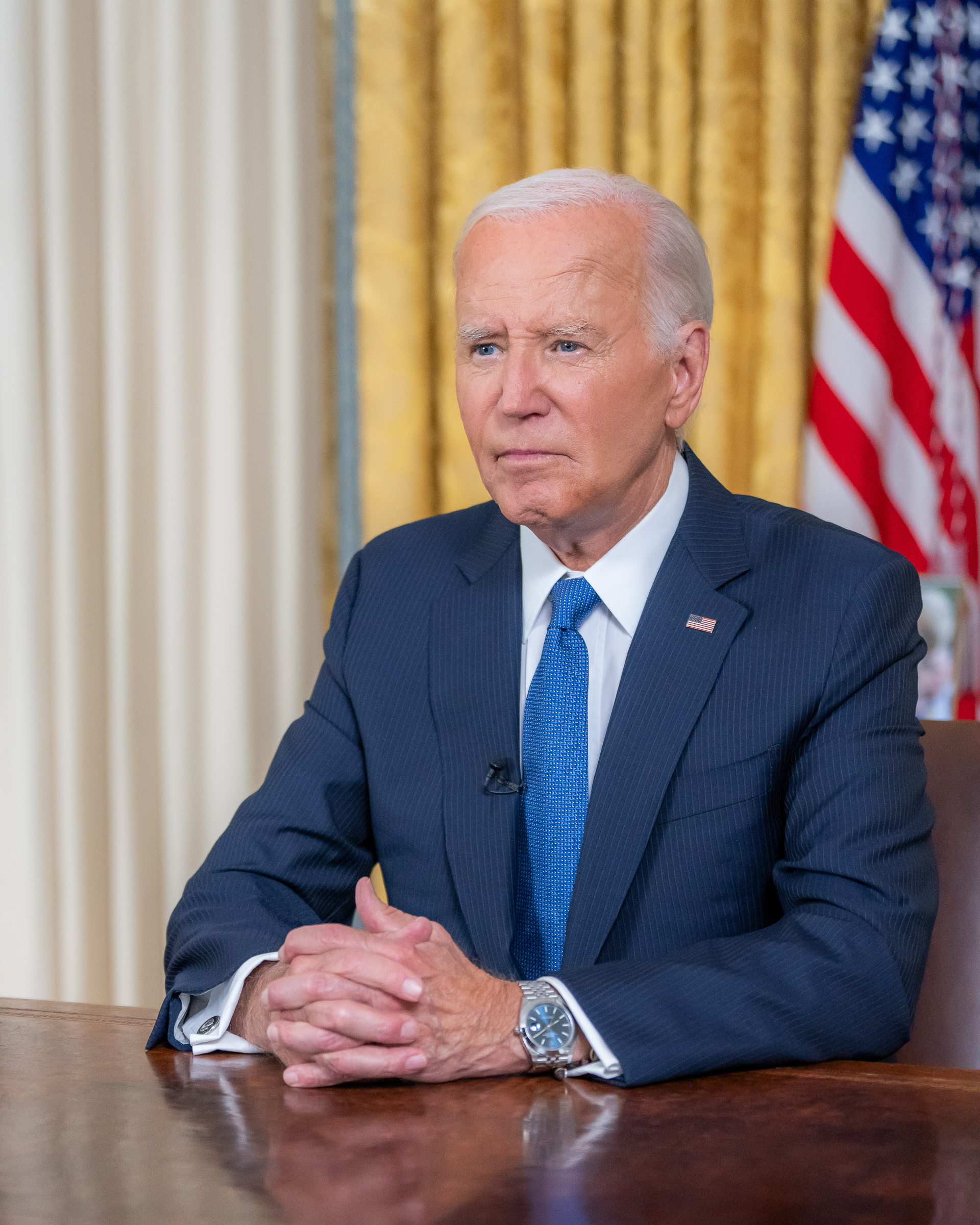
Biden addressing the nation regarding his decision not to run for re-election, July 24, 2024

On July 21, 2024, Biden announced his withdrawal from the 2024 presidential election and immediately endorsed Vice President Kamala Harris to replace him as the party's presidential nominee.

On August 20, 2024, the Washington Post editorial board published an op-ed stating that President Biden's inner circle had "worked to conceal his decline".

After formally securing the Democratic presidential nomination, Harris went on to lose the general election to Trump. Following Trump's victory, U.S. Representative Lloyd Doggett, who was the first sitting Democrat in Congress to openly call for President Joe Biden to withdraw from the 2024 election after the first presidential debate, stated that "I only regret I didn't do it earlier ... I believe that the only person in our caucus who doesn't share some responsibility for the outcome is Dean Phillips, who came out early."

On December 19, 2024, former CNN political commentator Chris Cillizza issued an apology about his Joe Biden coverage, stating, "I didn't push hard enough for information about his mental and physical decline in the moment. And I should have." Also on December 19, 2024, The Wall Street Journal released a detailed report entitled "How the White House Functioned With a Diminished Biden in Charge".

In December 2024, Mother Jones, Politico, and The New York Times applauded Dean Phillips for having raised concerns about Biden's age and health.

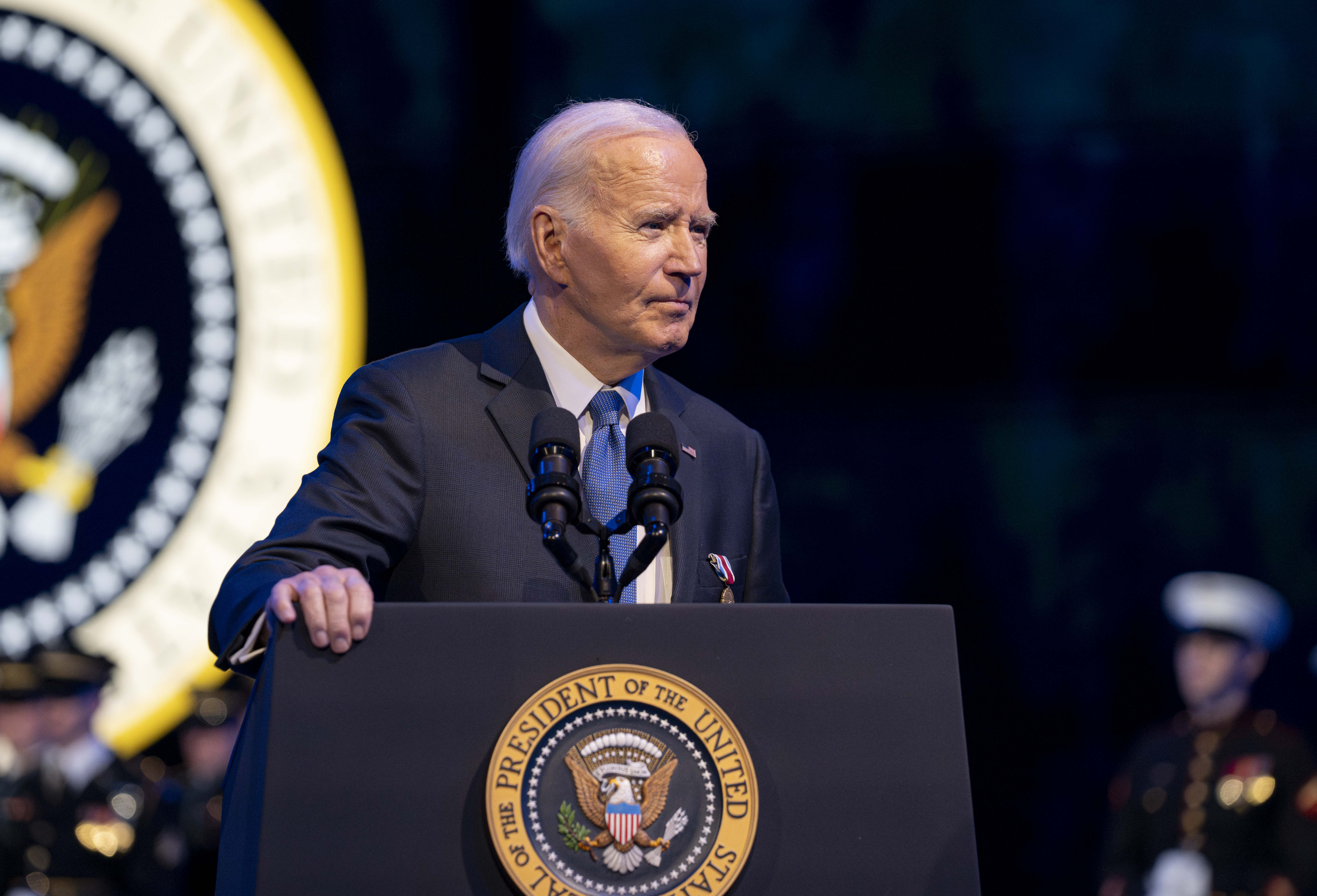
Biden speaks shortly before leaving office, January 16, 2025.

On January 17, 2025, The New York Times reported that Biden was "faltering" and "shaky", and had been protected by his inner circle.

On January 18, 2025, Ron Klain, Biden's first White House chief of staff, defended the president and his team. Klain said, "There was no cover-up. A Democratic congressman ran against him in the primary in 2024, with age as the only issue, and voters overwhelmingly voted for Biden."

Biden continued to serve as president until his term ended on January 20, 2025. At that time, Biden was 82 years old.

== Post-presidency (2025–present) ==
In September 2025, The Wall Street Journal reported that Biden was "struggling to cash in on his presidency" and asserted that this struggle was largely due to his age and health problems. Organizations and donors were reportedly reluctant to pay for speeches by Biden or fund his presidential library.

Amie Parnes, co-author of Fight: Inside the Wildest Battle for the White House (2025), said in April 2025 that Biden's inner circle, including First Lady Jill Biden, Mike Donilon, and Steve Ricchetti, bore the greatest amount of responsibility for concealing Biden's decline from the public. Parnes added that by the time his term ended, Biden was "a shell of himself".

In May 2025, Axios released the full five hours of audio of Biden's interview with special counsel Robert Hur. The interview was conducted on October 8–9, 2023. In the interview, Biden struggled to find the right words and dates when recounting the time of his son Beau's death, acknowledged that he might have wanted to keep a classified document "just for posterity's sake", described a trip to Mongolia on a tangent when asked about classified documents, joked that he was "a young man", and gave an inconsistent answer to the question of whether he gave instructions about where to find classified documents in his home. Lisa Lerer of The New York Times stated that the interview provided further evidence that Biden's acuity worsened throughout his presidency. "The Hur tapes reveal the president exactly as a majority of Americans believed him to be—and as Democrats repeatedly insisted he was not", she wrote. Lerer added that Hur's characterization of Biden as a "sympathetic, well-meaning, elderly man with a poor memory" was "not merely valid", but was "irrefutable".

That same month, Axios journalist Alex Thompson and CNN anchorman Jake Tapper published the book Original Sin, which levied claims against the Democratic Party of systemically covering up evidence of cognitive decline in Biden. The book alleges anecdotes such as Biden failing to recognize actor George Clooney during a fundraiser and forgetting the name of his national security adviser, Jake Sullivan, with the administration reportedly limiting the president's contacts to close advisors and family members while publicly downplaying Biden's mental issues. Tapper said that the White House was most concerned about, and sought to remove, the "well-meaning, elderly man with a poor memory" line from the Hur report.

Sullivan denied the book's allegations that Biden failed to recall his name. Chris Meagher, a spokesperson for Biden, said, "We continue to await anything that shows where Joe Biden had to make a presidential decision or where national security was threatened or where he was unable to do his job. In fact, the evidence points to the opposite—he was a very effective president". Another claim from Original Sin is that Biden aides had discussed the possible need for Biden to use a wheelchair if he were to win a second term. Biden's personal physician, Dr. Kevin O'Connor, privately warned Biden aides that "a wheelchair might be necessary for what could be a difficult recovery" if Biden were to have "a bad fall" in 2023 or 2024. In response to claims from the book Original Sin about Biden, comedian Jon Stewart on The Daily Show opined, "There was no cover-up—poll after poll showed vast majorities of the public thought Biden was too old and too out of it to run again. Dean Phillips mounted an entire primary campaign because of it. He along with most of the public knew it was a bad idea for Biden to run. We knew it." Barack Obama's former physician, Jeffrey Kuhlman, said in a June 2025 interview that Biden's doctor should have given Biden a cognitive test during his final year as president because of his age, contending that the results would have helped the White House and the public understand whether Biden was up to serving another four years.

Tyler Pager, one of the co-authors of 2024: How Trump Retook the White House and the Democrats Lost America, wrote a July 8, 2025 article containing excerpts of the book in The New York Times. Entitled "How Insularity Defined the Last Stages of Biden's Career" the article said that Biden's aides never had him directly meet with his campaign's pollsters until after his poor debate performance against Trump. Pager said this practice was part of a pattern of not only covering up Biden's age and health, but of insulating Biden from receiving accurate information that the public believed him to be too old to run again.

On September 18, 2025, Pennsylvania Governor Josh Shapiro said former Vice President Kamala Harris would "have to answer" for why she did not speak out publicly about Biden's ability to serve during his term. Regarding Biden, Shapiro also said: "I was very vocal with him, privately, and extremely vocal with his staff about my concerns about his fitness to be able to run for another term". Kamala Harris published a book entitled 107 Days, detailing her short presidential campaign. In the book, Harris called Biden's decision to run for reelection "reckless" and admitted that she knew that he was mentally and physically declining. She said she regretted supporting his reelection bid and that Biden's staff sidelined her, but said that it was Biden and his wife's decision for him to run again.

On October 28, 2025, the Republican-led House Oversight Committee released a report on Biden's cognitive and physical decline while in office. The report was entitled "The Biden Autopen Presidency: Decline, Delusion, and Deception in the White House".

On May 27, 2026, former first lady Jill Biden acknowledged in an interview for CBS News Sunday Morning that her husband had been "slowing down" over the course of his presidency, but she denied that any cognitive decline took place. She did later state that she believed her husband was having a stroke during his critical June 2024 debate. On June 1, 2026, Jill Biden also said that Joe Biden would have cancer for the rest of his life.

In August 2026, former Speaker of the United States House of Representatives Nancy Pelosi, speaking at Politico's The California Agenda: Sacramento Summit, said that those close to Joe Biden during his reelection campaign should have shared what they knew about his mental acuity. Pelosi also said that she urged Biden, during their private meeting at the White House, to release a diagnostic test from a doctor to prove to the public that he could "serve the next term."

On September 20, 2026, during an episode of The Daily Beast Podcast, Terry Moran, former Senior National Correspondent at ABC News, said, "I tried to do the story of Biden's health before anybody else did in network, because I'd seen it. And I got shut down very hard."

=== Cancer ===
In May 2025, Biden was diagnosed with aggressive prostate cancer that had metastasized to his bones, indicating Stage IV cancer. The diagnosis followed a routine physical on May 16, 2025, prompted by urinary symptoms and the discovery of a prostate nodule. A biopsy confirmed prostate adenocarcinoma with a Gleason score of 9 (Grade Group 5). Biden's office announced the diagnosis on May 18, 2025. Some doctors expressed surprise and doubt that the aggressive form of cancer had not been detected earlier, suspecting a possible cover-up. Others noted that some cancers can spread quickly without any external symptoms, noting that men over 70 in the U.S. are not routinely screened for cancers. Biden's spokesperson denied allegations of a cover-up.

Biden's spokesperson confirmed on September 4, 2025, that Biden had recently undergone Mohs surgery to remove skin cancer lesions from his forehead. The announcement came after he was seen in public with a visible scar and bandage while leaving a church service in Rehoboth Beach, Delaware. On October 11, 2025, Biden's spokesperson confirmed that he was undergoing radiation therapy and hormone treatment as part of his ongoing care for prostate cancer. On October 20, 2025, it was announced that Biden had completed a round of radiation therapy at Penn Medicine Radiation Oncology in the University of Pennsylvania in Philadelphia, Pennsylvania, with his daughter Ashley also posting photos on her Instagram story of Biden ringing a bell.

On August 7, 2026, Biden's son Hunter Biden told BBC News that Biden's cancer had spread to his bones and further. A month later, on September 8, Biden stated that his cancer treatment was working as planned.

=== Congressional investigations ===
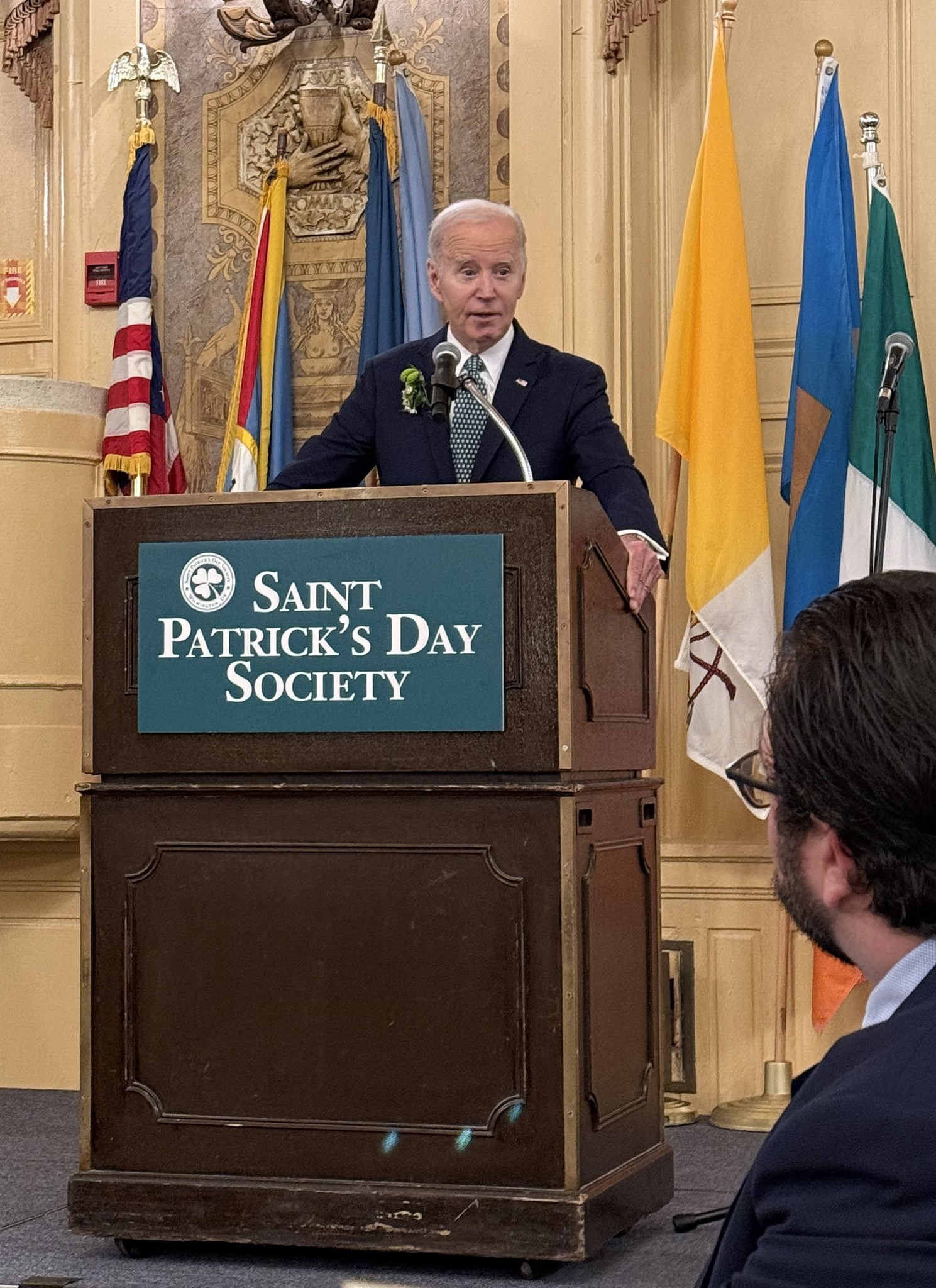
Biden speaking in March 2025

In May 2025, the House Oversight committee, led by Republican Representative James Comer, announced that it had begun an investigation into Biden's health and mental fitness while in office. The investigation is focused on the use of an autopen to sign certain pieces of legislation and executive orders. Comer has asked a series of former White House aides to appear for transcribed interviews.

That same month, Senate Republicans announced plans to launch their own investigation into Biden's cognitive abilities while in office. Republican Senator Ron Johnson, the chair of the Senate Permanent Subcommittee on Investigations, announced on May 21, 2025, that he was launching an investigation into former President Biden's health while in office and that his staff had written letters to more than two dozen top Biden administration officials requesting interviews with them. Republican Senators Eric Schmitt and John Cornyn scheduled a first-of-its-kind Senate Judiciary Committee hearing on the subject of Biden's mental fitness while in office for June 18, 2025. Cornyn also wrote a letter to Attorney General Pam Bondi urging a Department of Justice investigation into Biden's health. In June, Cornyn sought congressional testimony from Original Sin authors Jake Tapper and Alex Thompson for the hearing on Biden's health.

On June 5, 2025, Comer subpoenaed Biden's White House physician, Kevin O'Connor, to appear for a deposition later in the month. On June 10, it was reported that four senior Biden White House aides Neera Tanden, Anthony Bernal, Ashley Williams, and Annie Tomasini, all agreed to testify to the House Oversight Committee as part of its probe into Biden's health while in office. On June 18, 2025, Republicans on the Senate Judiciary Committee brought in three witnesses for the hearing on Biden's mental fitness while in office. On June 27, 2025, Comer sent out letters to former Biden White House Chief of Staff Jeff Zients, former Press Secretary Karine Jean-Pierre, former White House spokesmen Ian Sams, and former senior deputy Press Secretary Andrew Bates as part of the investigation into Biden's health demanding they appear before the panel for transcribed interviews.

On July 9, 2025, O'Connor declined to answer questions during a closed-door deposition with the House Oversight Committee for their probe into Biden's mental fitness, invoking his Fifth Amendment right. On July 16, 2025, Bernal invoked the Fifth Amendment and declined to answer questions from House Republicans investigating President Biden's mental state and use of the autopen while in office. On September 18, 2025, Zients told congressional investigators that Joe Biden's decision-making slowed during his time as president and that his ability to remember dates and names worsened over time. Also, Zients testified that after President Biden's debate performance last year, he advised the president's physician, Kevin O'Connor, to perform a comprehensive medical examination, which included a cognitive test.

=== Executive branch investigation ===
In a June 4, 2025, executive order, Trump ordered an investigation into whether aides to Biden concealed an alleged decline in his mental acuity and whether some of the Biden administration's actions were legally invalid because his aides had allegedly taken those actions without Biden's knowledge. In March 2026, it was reported by NBC News and The New York Times that the Justice Department had shelved the investigation into former President Joe Biden's use of an autopen.

== See also ==
- List of presidents of the United States by age
- Claims regarding the health of other public figures:
  - Age and health concerns about Donald Trump
  - Claims of Vladimir Putin's incapacity and death
- Term limits in the United States
- Gerontocracy#Presidency
