= Original Sin (Tapper and Thompson book) =

2025 book by Jake Tapper and Alex Thompson

- Author: Jake Tapper; Alex Thompson
- Language: English
- Subject: Age and health concerns about Joe Biden
- Genre: Nonfiction
- Publisher: Penguin Press
- Publication date: May 20, 2025
- Publication place: United States
- Media type: Book
- Pages: 352
- ISBN: 979-8-217-06067-2

Original Sin: President Biden's Decline, Its Cover-up, and His Disastrous Choice to Run Again is a 2025 non-fiction book by the American journalists Jake Tapper and Alex Thompson. It was published by Penguin Random House on May 20, 2025. It details the claims of a cover-up regarding Joe Biden's age and health during his presidency and reelection campaign, leading up to the 2024 presidential election.

== Background ==
The 2024 Joe Biden–Donald Trump presidential debate, moderated by Jake Tapper and Dana Bash of CNN, was held on June 27, 2024. Biden's debate performance caused widespread comment about his cognitive health, about his electability, how his age and health would be perceived by voters, and about his ability to serve a second term. This eventually led to Biden dropping out of the election and endorsing Vice President Kamala Harris to become the party's presidential nominee on July 21, 2024.

Harris lost the election to Trump, losing the popular vote 48.3–49.8% and the Electoral College 226–312. Harris had just 107 days (3.5 months) as the nominee and did not go through a primary election. Harris later wrote a book on the subject, entitled 107 Days.

In the aftermath of Harris' loss, many commentators speculated as to whether Harris or another nominee may have won had Biden not run for a second term. David Plouffe, who helped run Harris' campaign, said that Biden's poor debate performance and dropping out more than three weeks later doomed Harris to defeat.

== Contents ==
The book is based on around 200 interviews, the majority of which were conducted with Democratic insiders following the 2024 United States presidential election. It examines Joe Biden's cognitive and physical deterioration, leading up to the presidential election, particularly the Joe Biden–Donald Trump presidential debate. Following the announcement of the book, Axios reported that "Thompson and Tapper draw a direct line from Biden's decision to run again—his 'original sin' that led to a campaign of 'gaslighting and denial'—and the election of President Trump."

The book stated that during Joe Biden's reelection presidential campaign, there were discussions about having Biden use a wheelchair in the event that he won a second term. Physician Dr. Kevin O'Connor said that "a wheelchair might be necessary for what could be a difficult recovery", if Biden had a "bad fall" in 2023 or 2024. A spokesperson stated that while medical exams "made clear" that Biden had a "stiffened gait caused, in part, by wear and tear to his spine", no necessary treatment was given.

Despite Biden's insistence that he would have defeated Trump if he had stayed in the race, the book stated that there were no polls supporting this claim, adding that "there was no credible data ... to support the notion that he would have won." One poll conducted from November 6–7, 2024 found that Biden would have lost the popular vote 42-49% to Trump. According to Semafor, the book explained that digital video "was a constant struggle" and Biden's campaign was "getting creative with editing" such as using slow motion videos to hide how slowly Biden was walking.

Another issue was that Joe Biden began "staring blankly" at people that he had known for years, including actor George Clooney, and becoming "more disoriented and incoherent" when fatigued. The book explained that Biden's inner circle wanted to keep him happy and "shield him from bad news", which was occasionally about the president himself and his health. Several members of the cabinet of Joe Biden stated that they would go months without seeing the president, despite having "regular access" to Biden beforehand. Meetings were so scripted, Tapper said to Terry Gross, that "cabinet secretaries thought they were weird".

Those running the White House in place of Biden were called "the Politburo" within the administration, Tapper and Thompson said, who used the term in the book. Among the members were Mike Donilon, Steve Ricchetti, Bruce Reed, and Ron Klain. Influential non-Politburo individuals in the White House included Jill Biden, Hunter Biden, Anthony Bernal, Anita Dunn, and Annie Tomasini. They shielded the president from the press; Biden was the first sitting president in decades and possibly in history, Thompson said, to never have a formal interview with The New York Times, Washington Post, Wall Street Journal, or Reuters. His only interview with a national newspaper was with USA Today just before the end of his presidency. "One person told us that the presidency was, at best, a five-person board with Joe Biden as chairman of the board", Tapper told Gross. While that person would only speak on background, Senators Mark Warner and Michael Bennet told the authors about conversations with the president in 2023 and 2024 that caused great concern about Biden's acuity. "More than one" cabinet member told the authors that by 2024 they did not think the president would be able to handle a national security emergency.

Tapper and Thompson wrote an article excerpting the book in The New Yorker a week before its release. Tapper said that the book showed that "the White House was lying, not only to the press, not only to the public, but they were lying to members of their own Cabinet. They were lying to White House staffers. They were lying to Democratic members of Congress, to donors, about how bad things had gotten". "Then I think the real part of the cover-up", Tapper said, "comes with not just the fact that he's at, you know, 40 or 50-person fundraisers using a teleprompter, which is bizarre and unprecedented for a president who should be able to speak extemporaneously for 10 minutes". A "very high-profile Democrat"—who had been assured of the president's good health—met alone with Biden and Jill Biden after the president's withdrawal from the reelection: "he wasn't F-ing fine", quoted Tapper.

Tapper told Gross that after also being assured by others of Biden's acuity, at the debate "I admit I was shocked [by] Biden's inability to form a coherent thought, his inability just to articulate why he should be president of the United States". Afterwards, "the obvious remedy to fixing what he had just done was to go out and do 15 interviews and 20 town halls and about five press conferences, and just show people that he was sharp as a tack, as they had been saying. And the problem was he couldn't do that".

When Jeffrey Goldberg asked whether those around Biden were "lying to themselves or were they just lying" about the president's incapacity, Tapper and Thompson said "both". While Biden was the only person who had beaten Trump and Trump was to them, Tapper said, "an existential threat to the country", misrepresenting the president's condition also benefited themselves; Donilon demanded and was paid $4 million by the 2024 Biden campaign. The Politburo's goal was to reach Election Day while hiding the president "and then we can figure it out after that", Tapper said, a situation Goldberg and Tapper compared to "Weekend at Bernie's".

In 2020 Tapper accused Lara Trump during an interview of making fun of Biden's stutter; she denied doing so, instead stating that she was criticizing Biden's cognitive ability. Tapper told Gross "In retrospect, what she said aged well and what I said aged poorly, 100%. And I've called Lara Trump and told her that and apologized". Stating that "very few people outside the conservative media world" had discussed Biden's acuity, Tapper said "I have learned a tremendous lesson about covering these issues from the humility I feel from this experience".

== Reception ==
The book was favorably reviewed in The New York Times, The Washington Post, and the Los Angeles Times. Tyler Austin Harper of The Atlantic compared Biden's decline to that of the title character in Shakespeare's play King Lear. David Smith of The Guardian stated that the book "presents a scathing account of a president cocooned from reality". Norman Solomon of The Nation praised the book, while also cautioning that sections of the book should be treated with some degree of skepticism due to their reliance on anonymous sources and occasional hearsay.

The book has also been subject to significant scrutiny. A spokesperson from Biden's team criticized the book as an "effort to make a profit" and that "we continue to await anything that shows where Joe Biden had to make a presidential decision or where national security was threatened or where he was unable to do his job". Biden's granddaughter Naomi Biden stated that the book "amounts to a bunch of unoriginal, uninspired lies written by irresponsible self promoting journalists out to make a quick buck".

== See also ==
- 107 Days
- Shattered: Inside Hillary Clinton's Doomed Campaign
- Fight: Inside the Wildest Battle for the White House
- Uncharted: How Trump Beat Biden, Harris, and the Odds in the Wildest Campaign in History
- 2024: How Trump Retook the White House and the Democrats Lost America
- The Dying President, 1998 book about the concealment of prior Democratic president Franklin D. Roosevelt's hypertension in his final term
