= Chris Whipple =

American filmmaker and author

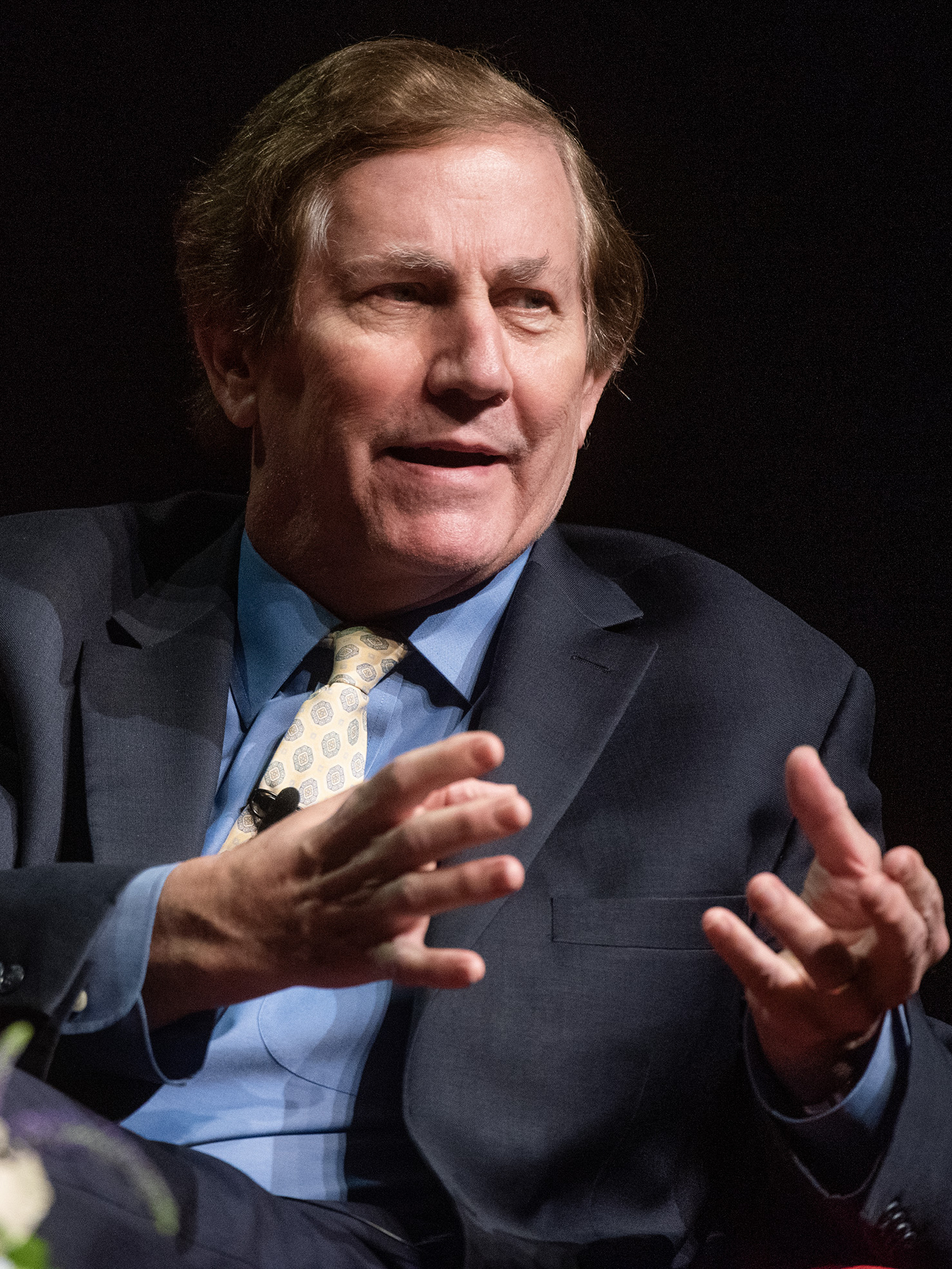
Whipple in 2023

Chris C. Whipple is an American political journalist, documentary filmmaker, and author. Whipple has written for Vanity Fair and other publications, focusing on American politics.

== Career ==
Whipple was an executive producer and writer on Showtime's 2015 documentary The Spymasters. He has worked on segments of TV news shows that have won Peabody and Emmy Awards, including 60 Minutes at CBS and Primetime at ABC.

In December 2025, Whipple published a two-part Vanity Fair profile of the second Trump presidency, interviewing White House chief of staff Susie Wiles throughout the first year of Donald Trump’s second administration. He also profiled Vice President JD Vance, Secretary of State Marco Rubio, and other Trump officials. Whipple's reporting attracted significant attention from Democrats and Republicans, with the Trump administration responding directly to the news coverage. Wiles called the story a "hit piece," but Whipple responded that all of her comments were "on tape."

== Education ==
Whipple attended Yale University, where he majored in history. He is an associate fellow of Timothy Dwight College at Yale.

== Books ==
- The Gatekeepers: How the White House Chiefs of Staff Define Every Presidency (2017)
- The Spymasters: How the CIA Directors Shape History and the Future (2020)
- The Fight of His Life: Inside Joe Biden's White House (2023)
- Uncharted: How Trump Beat Biden, Harris, and the Odds in the Wildest Campaign in History (2025)
