= Alex Thompson (journalist) =

American journalist

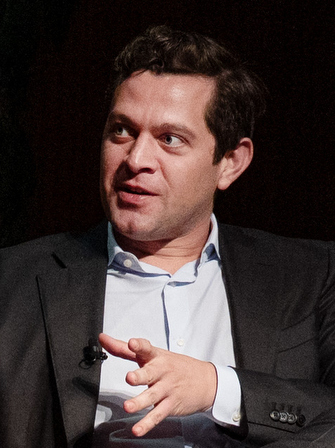
- Thompson in 2025
- Born: Alexander Scott Thompson
- Education: Harvard University
- Occupation: Journalist
- Employer: Axios
- Notable work: Original Sin
- Awards: Aldo Beckman Award for Journalistic Excellence

Alexander Scott Thompson is an American journalist. He is a political correspondent for Axios and co-authored the book Original Sin with Jake Tapper.

== Early life ==
Thompson grew up in Agoura Hills, California, and attended Agoura High School. He later graduated from Harvard University.

== Career ==
Thompson previously worked as an assistant for Maureen Dowd at The New York Times. In September 2016, while working as a reporter for Vice News, he was arrested for trespassing at the Omni Hotel in Houston after asking about press credentials for a Trump campaign rally. The Trump campaign clarified that they had no involvement in his arrest, and charges were later dropped.

From 2018, Thompson reported on national politics at Politico, especially on the 2020 United States presidential election. Later, as a White House reporter, he created and co-authored the Politico newsletter "Transition Playbook", later known as the "West Wing Playbook", with Ryan Lizza.

Around 2021, after Axios CEO Jim VandeHei became impressed with Thompson's "tough" coverage of Joe Biden for Politico, he and Axios co-founder Mike Allen asked Thompson to work for their publication at a dinner. Later, in January 2023, Axios hired Thompson as a national politics correspondent.

On April 27, 2025, Thompson received the Aldo Beckman Award for Journalistic Excellence from the White House Correspondents' Association for his coverage of the age and health concerns about Joe Biden for Axios. He spoke at the dinner about how reporters' failure to cover this story led to public mistrust in the media.

On May 20, 2025, Penguin Press published Thompson's and Jake Tapper's book Original Sin, which alleged that a cover-up of Joe Biden's cognitive decline took place.

On November 16, 2025, Thompson and Holly Otterbein launched a weekly Sunday newsletter, "Axios 2028". As of 2025, in addition to being a national political correspondent for Axios, he is also a contributor for CNN.

== Personal life ==
As of 2025, Thompson resided in Washington, D.C.
