= Lisa Lerer =

Political journalist

Lisa Lerer is an American journalist who is a national political correspondent for The New York Times. She is the co-author, with Elizabeth Dias, of The Fall of Roe: The Rise of a New America. Lerer covered national politics for nearly two decades, including five presidential campaigns, the White House, Congress and congressional races.

== Early life and education ==
Lerer attended the University of Pennsylvania and Columbia University Graduate School of Journalism. She was a Nieman fellow at Harvard University in 2018.

== Career ==
Lerer began her journalism career reporting for The American Lawyer, Businessweek, Bloomberg News, Politico, and the Associated Press. She gained recognition covering the 2016 U.S. presidential race while at the Associated Press.

In 2018, Lerer joined The New York Times and became the founding author of the On Politics newsletter. She covered the 2020 election and spoken about covering the pandemic and an unconventional campaign. She was also part of a cohort of women covering that race selected by the International Women's Media Foundation. By 2021, she was promoted to national political correspondent, covering presidential campaigns, Congress, the White House, and U.S. elections more broadly. She is the second woman in the history of the New York Times to hold that role and a go-to writer for important political pieces.

Lerer often writes about women in politics and their political advancement. She has been a political analyst on a wide range of networks and podcasts including CNN, PBS News Hour, MSNBC, Fox News, Washington Week, CBS, Frontline and is a frequent contributor to The Daily.

She co-authored the book The Fall of Roe: The Rise of a New America, with Elizabeth Dias, the national religion correspondent at The New York Times. The book received positive reviews from the New York Times, The Guardian, New York magazine and other outlets. It was featured on PBS Newshour and The Daily Show. In 2025, the book was a finalist for the ABA Silver Gavel Award and the Ohio Book Award.

Lerer has been recognized for her insightful political reporting by several journalism organizations and has spoken at various academic and public forums, including the Aspen Ideas Festival, Ashville Ideas Summit, the NorthStar Summit, the Institute for Politics at Harvard University and the Rockefeller Center at Dartmouth College.

== Personal life ==
Lerer was raised in West Hartford, Conn. After more than a dozen years in Washington, she lives in New York with her husband and children.

== Bibliography ==
- Dias, Elizabeth; Lerer, Lisa (2024). The fall of Roe: the rise of a new America (First ed.). New York: Flatiron Books. ISBN 978-1-250-88139-7.
