= 2024 Joe Biden–Donald Trump presidential debate =

First 2024 United States presidential debate
- Date(s): June 27, 2024; 2 years ago
- Duration: 90 minutes
- Venue: Techwood Turner Campus, Studio D
- Location: Atlanta, Georgia
- Participants: Joe Biden (Note: Both Biden and Trump were participating in the debate as presumptive nominees for their parties. Biden would withdraw his candidacy following the debate.); Donald Trump
- Footage: CNN on YouTube
- Moderator(s): Jake Tapper and Dana Bash of CNN
- Transcript: Transcript on CNN

A presidential debate between incumbent United States president Joe Biden and then former president Donald Trump took place on June 27, 2024. At the time of the debate, Biden was the presumptive nominee for the Democratic Party in the 2024 U.S. presidential election, while Trump was the presumptive nominee of the Republican Party. The debate was hosted by CNN and held in Atlanta.

Both political columnists and surveyed viewers widely considered Trump as the debate's winner. Biden's performance was seen by many as disastrous for his re-election campaign, raising concerns about his age and health and capability to serve a second term in office. In the moments after the debate, Biden's wife wondered if he might have suffered a stroke, although his doctors medically cleared him. Though his campaign was initially defiant, Biden ultimately bowed to party pressure and withdrew from the election on July 21.

== Prelude ==
=== Agreement to debate ===
Slide used to announce the debate, when it was confirmed on May 15.

As the 2024 campaign developed, there was a serious possibility of no televised debates. Neither campaign favored use of the Commission on Presidential Debates that had brokered national debates since 1987. An agreement to debate was announced on May 15. Both campaigns agreed to two debates, with the first in June to be hosted by CNN.

A Biden campaign internal memorandum from April 15 outlined its logic for an early debate along with plans for debate preparation. The document noted that the Commission's earliest proposed date was after postal voting in the United States began, so proposed to schedule it to occur within a few weeks. "By holding the first debate in the spring, YOU will be able to reach the widest audience possible", the memo told Biden:

before we are deep in the summer months with the conventions, Olympics and family vacations taking precedence. In addition, the earlier YOU are able to debate, the better, so that the American people can see YOU standing next to Trump and showing the strength of YOUR leadership, compared to Trump’s weakness and chaos.

Another advantage of an early debate, the memo said, was that if Biden performed poorly the campaign would have time to recover. Not all of Biden's advisors wanted an early debate, and some did not want him to debate Trump at all. Jen O'Malley Dillon and Ron Klain were very supportive of an early debate; Anita Dunn and Steve Ricchetti were against it, but Dunn became supportive after the Hur special counsel investigation questioned Biden's memory. The campaign rejected a suggestion to prevent the president from debating from an unnamed donor, who became alarmed by the health of Joe Biden after attending a fundraiser with him.

=== Qualifications ===
Although Trump claimed to have no objection to the independent candidate Robert F. Kennedy Jr. participating in the debate, the Biden campaign opposed Kennedy's inclusion. On May 29, Kennedy filed a complaint with the Federal Election Commission alleging that the Biden and Trump campaigns colluded to prevent him from appearing at the debate.

The qualification criteria that were adopted for the June 27 CNN debate required participants to:

- Be constitutionally eligible to hold the presidency;
- File with the Federal Election Commission;
- Appear on a sufficient number of state ballots to have a mathematical possibility of winning a majority vote in the Electoral College;
- Agree to the rules of the debate; and
- Reach at least 15% support in four national public opinion polls selected by CNN between March 13 and June 20, 2024.

Seventeen polls met CNN's criteria, with Biden and Trump meeting the 15% threshold in every poll. Kennedy met the threshold in three, peaking at 16%. Both Justice For All Party candidate Cornel West and Green Party candidate Jill Stein peaked at 4% support, and Libertarian candidate Chase Oliver peaked at 1% support. No other candidate was included in any qualifying polls. Kennedy also did not meet the ballot requirement, having been confirmed in only five states at the time of the debate. Kennedy would counterprogram the debate with a livestreamed campaign event dubbed "The Real Debate", in which moderator John Stossel posed the questions from the debate to Kennedy Jr. using the same format.

Qualified candidates for the first debate
Candidate	Met polling criterion	Met EV criteria	Met both criteria/ invited	Ref.
Biden	Yes; 17 qualifying polls	Yes; 538 EVs certified (Note: as presumptive Democratic nominee)	Yes	
Trump	Yes; 17 qualifying polls	Yes; 538 EVs certified (Note: as presumptive Republican nominee)	Yes	
Oliver	No; 0 qualifying polls	Yes; 337 EVs certified (Note: Alaska (3); Arkansas (6); Arizona (11); California (54); Connecticut (7); Delaware (3); Florida (30); Georgia (16); Hawaii (4); Idaho (4); Indiana (11); Iowa (6); Kansas (6); Louisiana (8); Maine (4); Maryland (10); Michigan (15); Mississippi (6); Missouri (10); Nebraska (5); Nevada (6); North Carolina (16); North Dakota (3); Oklahoma (7); Oregon (8); South Carolina (9); South Dakota (3); Texas (40); Utah (6); Vermont (3); West Virginia (4); Wisconsin (10); Wyoming (3)) (Note: Some news outlets included the following four states in Oliver's total which are not included here for the following reasons: Two state party affiliates rejected Oliver as the party's nominee: Colorado (10); Montana (4); Two state party affiliates disaffiliated with the party to form the Liberal Party in 2022: Massachusetts (11); New Mexico (5))	No	
Kennedy	No; 3 qualifying polls	No; 139 EVs certified (Note: California (54); Delaware (3); Florida (30); Hawaii (4); Michigan (15); Oklahoma (7); South Carolina (9); Tennessee (11); Utah (6)) (Note: The Kennedy campaign also claimed they were certified for the ballot in two other states, but these claims were not verified by independent media outlets: Mississippi (6); Texas (40); Even if these states were included in CNN's tally, Kennedy would have still failed to meet the 270 electoral vote requirement by June 20.)	No	
Stein	No; 0 qualifying polls	No; 263 EVs certified (Note: All but Idaho as presumptive Green Party nominee: Arizona (11); Arkansas (6); California (54); Colorado (10); Washington, D.C. (3); Florida (30); Hawaii (4); Idaho (4) (as independent); Louisiana (8); Maine (4); Michigan (15); Mississippi (24); Montana (4); Nevada (6); New Mexico (5); North Carolina (16); Oregon (8); South Carolina (9); Texas (40); Utah (6); West Virginia (4); Wisconsin (10))	No	
West	No; 0 qualifying polls	No; 39 EVs certified (Note: Alaska (3, as Aurora Party); Colorado (10, as Unity Party); Oregon (8, as Progressive Party); South Carolina (9, as United Citizens Party); Utah (6); Vermont (3, as Green Mountain Peace and Justice Party))	No	

=== Preparations ===
Announcement of the broadcast with the scheduled time it aired

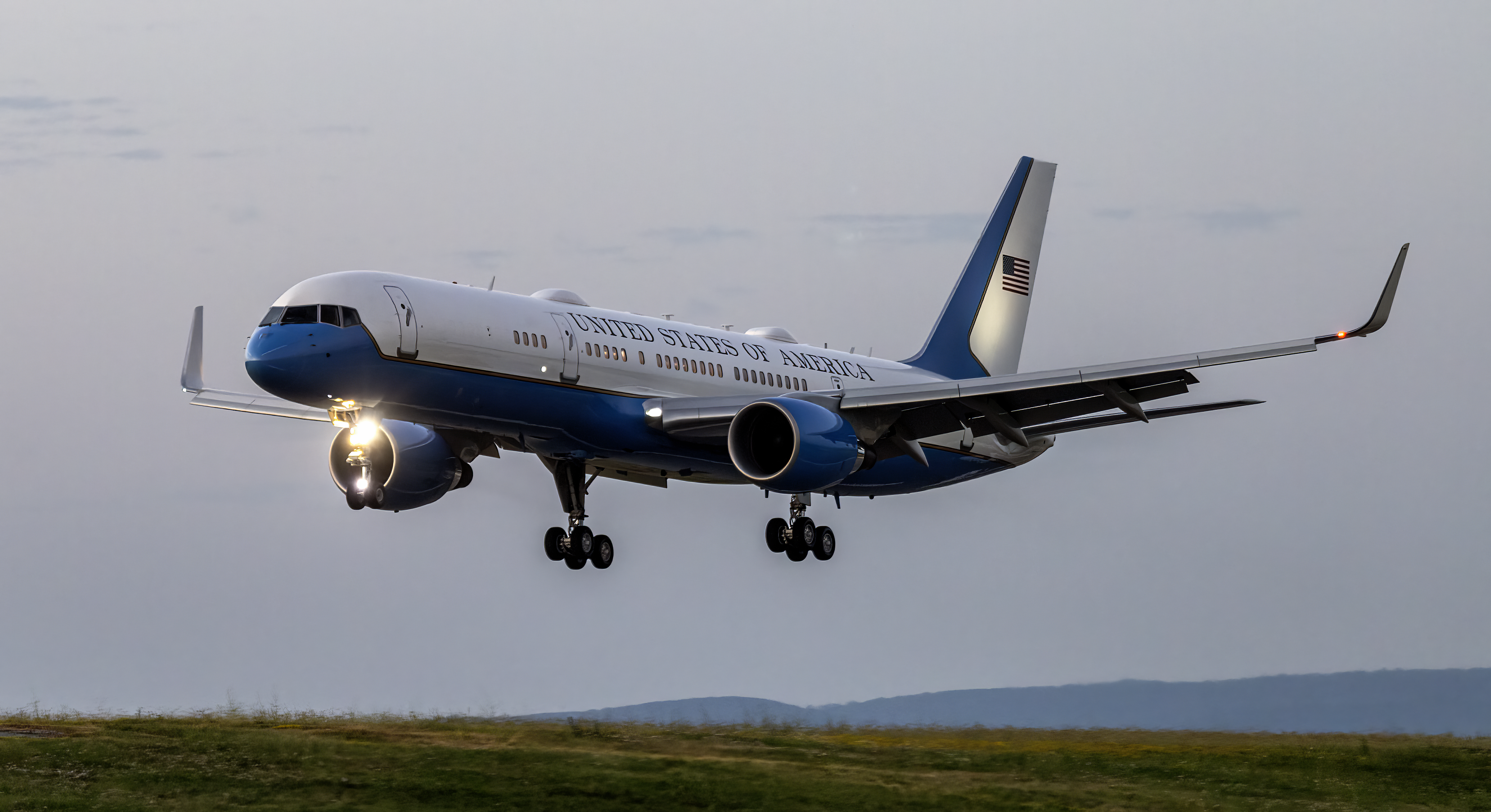
Air Force One VC-32 aircraft arriving at Hagerstown Regional Airport from Rehoboth Beach on June 20

The April 15 Biden campaign memo recommended that the president hold many informal question-and-answer sessions with the media, a town hall event, and prepare for at least five days before the debate. The Biden campaign hired Klain, Biden's former chief of staff, to assist him in debating Trump; Klain helped Biden during the 2020 presidential debates. White House deputy chief of staff Bruce Reed collected material on policy contrasts with Trump. Filmmaker Steven Spielberg reportedly had helped coach Biden in preparation for the debate. Biden engaged in preparations at Camp David, arriving on the night of June 20 and remaining there nearly until the debate. Biden was exhausted from traveling before the debate, needed to take naps during the debate preparations, and performed poorly during practice debates. Hunter Biden additionally suggested that President Biden's performance was hindered by using Ambien as a sleeping aid in the run-up to the debate.

According to political advisor Marc Lotter, Trump "views his rallies as debate prep" and engaged with limited debate preparation. The Trump campaign did not appoint a Biden stand-in for Trump to debate. At a rally in Racine, Wisconsin, Trump suggested Biden would be a formidable opponent, alleging Biden would be on cocaine and that the moderators would assist him.

== Format ==
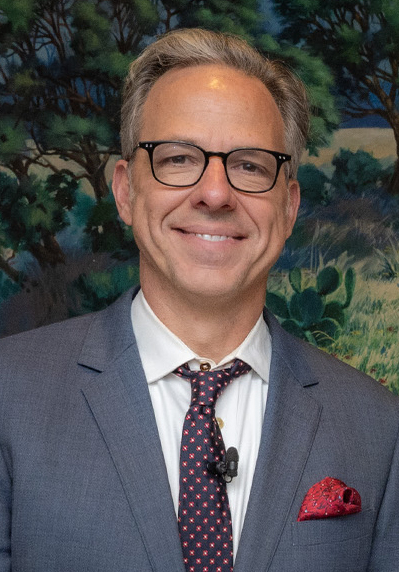
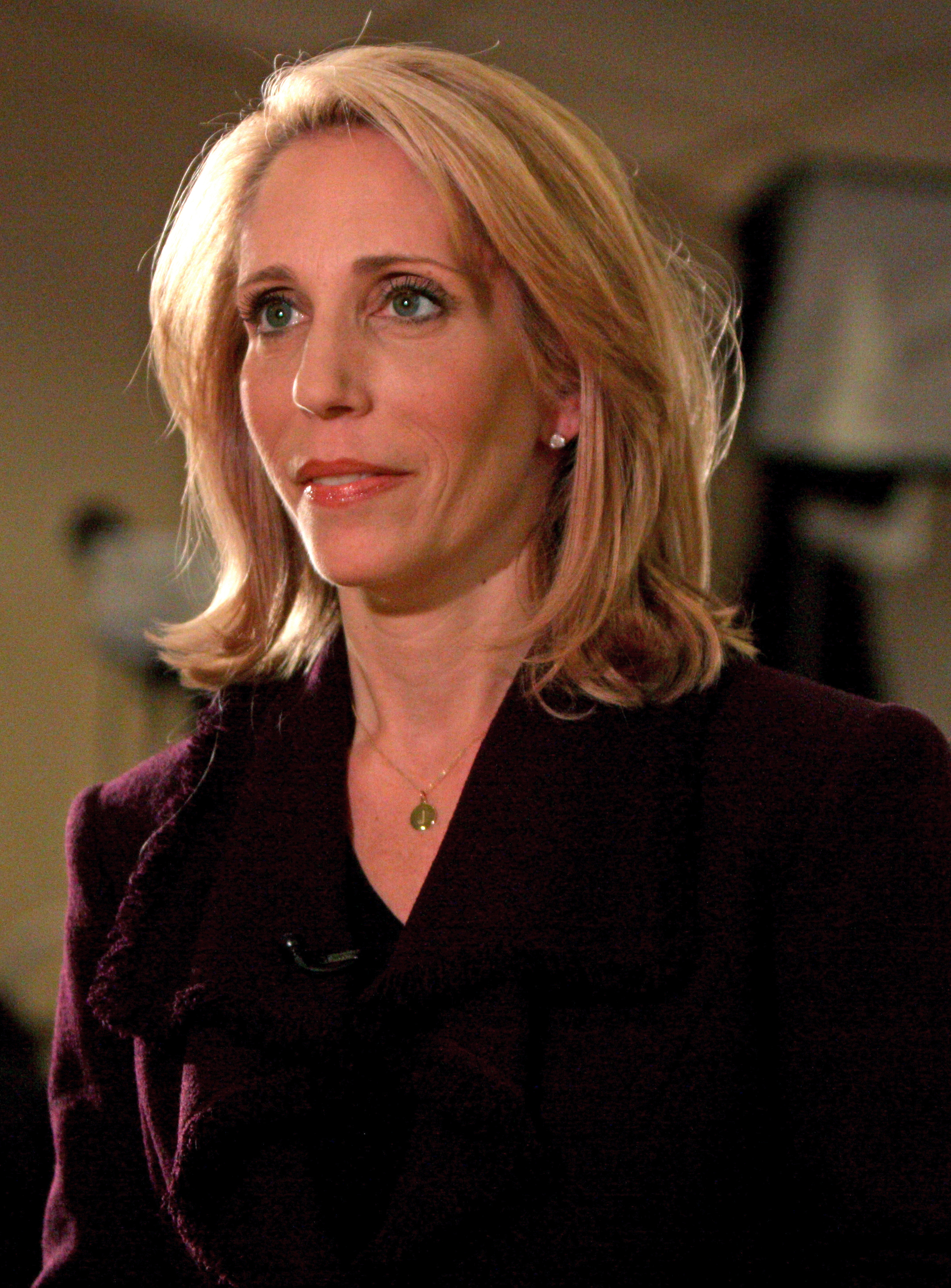
Moderators Jake Tapper and Dana Bash

The debate was streamed or broadcast by most major U.S. news organizations. The debate ran for 90 minutes, with no audience members present. Trump's and Biden's microphones were only turned on when it was their turn to speak (in response to the events of the September 29, 2020 presidential debate). Debate rules written by CNN allocated two minutes for answering the question posed by the moderators, Dana Bash and Jake Tapper, and one minute for rebuttals and responses to the rebuttals. The primary issues addressed in the debate were immigration, the economy and inflation, abortion, foreign policy and the wars in Ukraine and Gaza, legal issues of the participants, Social Security, the January 6 attack on the U.S. Capitol, and the participants' ages.

== Debate ==
Excluding the closing, the debate moderators asked 20 questions. Four questions centered on the economy, four on democracy, three on foreign policy, two on immigration, two on abortion, and one each on climate change, age, opioids, race, and tax reform.

Moderator Jake Tapper began the debate with inflation figures. Biden attributed the state of the economy to Trump's presidency. Trump rebutted by saying he built the "greatest economy in the history of our country" before the COVID-19 pandemic. Trump said that Biden supported the job growth of illegal immigrants, defending his ten percent tariff, and criticized the 2020–2021 U.S. troop withdrawal from Afghanistan. He argued that Biden began his term with successes from the Trump presidency, but chose to implement negative reform.

Viewers were immediately chagrined by Biden's struggling delivery. In the assessment of Politico,

The alarm bells for Democrats started ringing the second Biden started speaking in a haltingly hoarse voice. Minutes into the debate, he struggled to mount an effective defense of the economy on his watch and flubbed the description of key health initiatives he's made central to his reelection bid... He repeatedly mixed up "billion" and "million," and found himself stuck for long stretches of the 90-minute debate playing defense.

And when he wasn't speaking, he stood frozen behind his podium, mouth agape, his eyes wide and unblinking for long stretches of time.

About an hour into the debate, Democratic operatives informed the media that Biden's hoarse voice was explained by a cold. According to the Columbia Journalism Review, "Some journalists wondered aloud why Biden's campaign hadn't leaked his cold beforehand as an expectation-management measure, though others weren't buying it as an explanation for his verbal shortcomings."

At one point, after a question on the national debt, Biden trailed off, saying: "Making sure that we're able to make every single solitary person eligible for what I've been able to deal with ... the COVID ... Excuse me, with dealing with everything we have to do with ... look ... if... we finally beat Medicare." Trump retorted, "Well, he's right. He did beat Medicare. He beat it to death." Tapper later said he wrote "holy smokes" on his iPad after the answer, and Bash wrote a note to Tapper saying Biden had just lost the election.

On illegal border crossings, Biden said, "I'm going to continue to move until we get to total ban—on the total initiative relative to what we're going to do with more border patrol and more asylum officers", with Biden seeming to mumble at the end of his sentence. Trump responded, "I really don't know what he said at the end of that sentence. I don't think he knows what he said either." At one point, Trump and Biden briefly had an argument over golfing abilities during a question regarding their fitness as president due to age.

Responding to a question on the Gaza war, Trump used the word "Palestinian" as a slur to attack Biden, calling him a "very bad Palestinian."

According to Tapper, he and Bash felt that Biden did not understand how bad his performance was after the debate ended.

=== Statistics and fact-checking ===
Trump spoke more than Biden in the debate, with CNN reporting the former to have spoken 40 minutes and 12 seconds, and the latter 35 minutes and 41 seconds. Trump went off topic about 50% of the time, while Biden went off topic about 30% of the time during the debate.

During the debate, Trump and Biden used personal attacks against each other. NBC News found that Trump made 106 attacks during the debate, while Biden made 72.

The moderators did not fact check the candidates. News organizations published articles after the debate documenting the truthfulness of the candidates' claims, finding that Trump made more exaggerated and false statements, while Biden had incorrectly cited information. The New York Times called Trump's statements "often fact-free and absurdly hyperbolic." However, some fact-checkers also noted that Trump's dishonesty was likely to be overshadowed by Biden's poor performance. Numerous news outlets also mentioned lies and falsehoods (Note: Lies and falsehoods) and fact-checked the candidates.

Glenn Kessler, fact-checker for The Washington Post, summarized "35 of the most noteworthy claims that initially caught our interest", claims which he analyzed in depth. FactCheck.org summarized its coverage of the many false and inaccurate claims made by the candidates, which were also analyzed. The Associated Press also analyzed a number of false claims.

=== Viewership ===
Network	Viewers
CNN	9,530,000
Fox News	9,276,000
ABC	9,210,000
NBC	5,390,000
CBS	5,011,000
MSNBC	4,122,000
Fox	3,677,000
Fox Business	397,000

Broadcast networks

Cable news networks

CNN reported that 47.9 million people watched the first debate, down from 73 million viewers during the first 2020 presidential debate. Nielsen Media Research later reported the number of viewers at 51.3 million; this does not include individuals who watched the debate through social media, streaming services, or listened through radio.

== Reception and aftermath ==
=== Overview ===
In the aftermath of the debate, the Biden campaign was flooded with requests for comment. The Trump campaign received only a few media requests the next morning, as reporters continued focusing on Biden. "No one was more shocked at Biden's performance than Donald Trump", an advisor told the Washington Post. Trump reportedly told aides that he could not even look at Biden. Several political analysts, including Susan Glasser, Tim Miller and Jeff Greenfield, described it as the worst televised presidential debate ever, with Biden's weak performance overshadowing Trump's falsehoods. Several congressional Democrats thought that Biden "didn't even clear the lowest bar".

Political observers were essentially unanimous in calling the debate a disaster for Biden and his campaign for re-election. Many columnists, including from The Hill, CNN, Politico, The New York Times, USA Today, Business Insider, and Vox, considered Trump the winner of the debate, although most noted his performance appeared acceptable only when contrasted with Biden's. Columnists from MSNBC, The Cook Political Report, The Guardian, and the Los Angeles Times argued that while Trump did not "win" the debate, Biden "clearly lost".

Polls from CNN, YouGov, Ipsos, and FiveThirtyEight found that most viewers thought Trump had won the debate, although it did not significantly change support for either candidate, with Biden only losing a small amount of support. Amy Walter, the editor of The Cook Political Report, said that while Biden's poor performance stunned "Democratic elite types", many voters had already "priced this in". According to Crowdtangle, "most of the top 10 most-liked posts on Instagram about the debate were either pretty neutral or emphasized how bad it was for both campaigns....And on TikTok, there was also a universal vibe that both candidates, not just Biden, were less than ideal for the moment." Nevertheless, a poll by Morning Consult released on June 28 indicated that 60% of voters were in favor of replacing Biden as the Democratic nominee.

Debate winner
Outlet	Trump	Biden	Not sure
CNN	67%	33%	Steady
YouGov	43%	22%	35%
Ipsos/538	60%	21%	19%

The debate reinforced concerns about Biden's age.

In January 2026, Alabama resident Adam Benjamin Hall was arrested by police and charged for allegedly planning on assassinating Biden during the debate.

=== Biden campaign's response ===
"I know I'm not a young man, to state the obvious. I don't walk as easily as I used to. I don't speak as smoothly as I used to. I don't debate as well as I used to, but I know what I do know: I know how to tell the truth. I know right from wrong. And I know how to do this job, I know how to get things done. And I know like millions of Americans know: When you get knocked down, you get back up."

— Joe Biden, responding to criticism of his debate performance during a speech in North Carolina the following day (June 28, 2024).

Biden's doctors briefly assessed him as he left the venue; his debate performance had been so poor that his wife Jill thought he might have had a stroke.

After the debate, Biden remarked to reporters at a Waffle House that he thought he had done well. He added that he did not have any concerns about his performance, stating that it was difficult to debate "a liar". Biden's running mate, Vice President Kamala Harris and Biden's campaign manager Jen O'Malley Dillon both defended Biden.

The day after the debate, Biden admitted that his debate performance had been weak. The Biden campaign attempted to explain Biden's debate performance by saying he had a cold. He had been administered a COVID-19 test during his stay at Camp David, which was negative. Biden spoke about his debate performance on July 2, blaming it on fatigue from "foreign travel", alluding to his five back-to-back trips—to Europe twice and returning via Los Angeles, totalling thirty time-zone crossings—in eleven days earlier in June.

=== Democratic Party's response and Biden's withdrawal from the race ===
In the days following the debate, Democrats serving in Congress or as governors mostly refrained from explicitly calling for Biden to withdraw, fearing to harm Biden's chances of winning the election if he ended up remaining the nominee. Several prominent Democrats, including former Presidents Barack Obama and Bill Clinton, initially rallied behind Biden, and resisted calls for him to step down due to one "bad debate." Pennsylvania Democratic Senator John Fetterman, who had a similarly weak debate performance in his 2022 election, told fellow Democrats to "chill the fuck out", stating that he refused to join the "Democratic vultures on Biden's shoulder".

However, there were almost immediate calls from Democratic party strategists, commentators and donors for Biden to step aside. The editorial boards of several newspapers, including The New York Times and The Economist, also published editorials urging him to do so. Biden's 2020 campaign manager, Kate Bedingfield, said that there was no way to interpret his debate performance as good, while political consultant David Axelrod noted that it "confirmed people's fears" about Biden's age. Democratic strategist Van Jones said that Biden had failed a test to restore the confidence of the country, and that the reaction for many supporters was "not just panic, it's pain". A poll found that almost two-thirds of Democratic voters wanted Biden to withdraw from the race.

Biden stated in an ABC News interview with George Stephanopoulos on July 5 that he would not end his candidacy unless "the Lord Almighty came down and said, 'Joe, get out of the race'". He added, "The Lord Almighty's not coming down."

By July 19, 2024, more than 30 congressional Democrats had publicly called on Biden to end his presidential campaign. Many more had communicated the same message privately. On July 19, The Guardian reported that "after weeks of defiantly stating that he will remain the Democratic nominee, despite concerns about his age and mental acuity in the wake of last month's disastrous debate against Donald Trump", Biden was reportedly "reconsidering his position".

Biden ultimately withdrew from the race on July 21, 2024 and immediately endorsed Vice President Kamala Harris to replace him as the party's presidential nominee. Biden stated that he would continue serving as president for the remainder of his term. After securing the Democratic presidential nomination, Harris went on to lose the general election to Trump.

== See also ==
- Age and health concerns about Joe Biden
- Original Sin (Tapper and Thompson book)
