= Withdrawal of Joe Biden from the 2024 United States presidential election =

Major event in the run-up to the 2024 United states presidential election

- Part of the presidency of Joe Biden and the 2024 Democratic Party presidential primaries
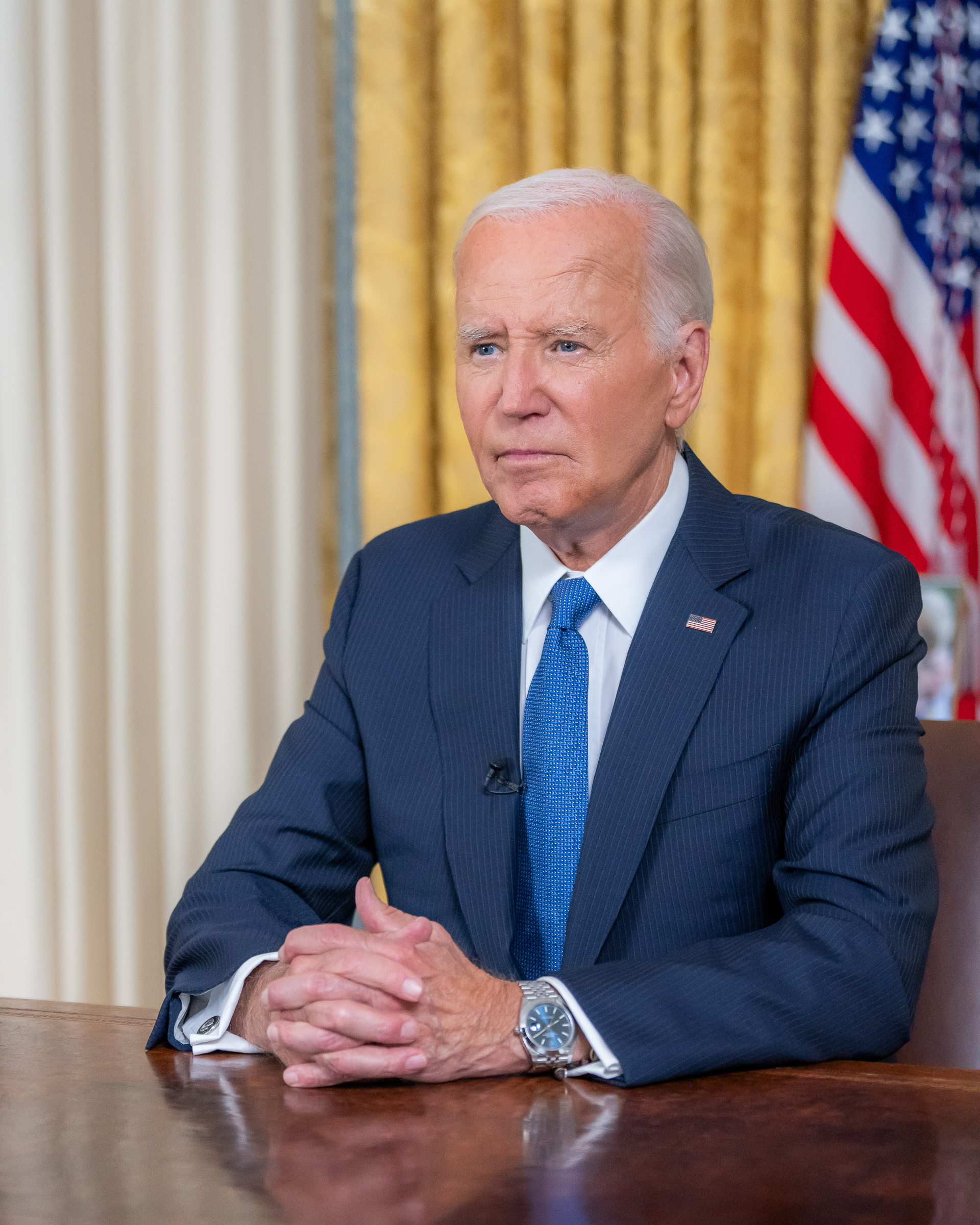
- Biden speaking about his earlier decision to withdraw his candidacy in an Oval Office address, July 24, 2024
- Date: July 21, 2024; 2 years ago
- Outcome: The Kamala Harris 2024 presidential campaign was launched on July 21, 2024.; Harris officially became the Democratic presidential nominee on August 5, 2024.; Donald Trump was elected the 47th president on November 5, 2024.; Biden retired when Trump was inaugurated on January 20, 2025.

On July 21, 2024, Joe Biden, the 46th president of the United States, announced his withdrawal from the 2024 United States presidential election.

Biden, a Democrat who had been elected president in 2020, stated on April 25, 2023, that he would run for re-election in 2024 with incumbent Vice President Kamala Harris as his running mate. Biden went on to win an overwhelming majority of delegates in the 2024 Democratic Party presidential primaries, where he easily defeated challengers such as Representative Dean Phillips and became the party's presumptive nominee.

Concerns about Biden's age and health had emerged during his presidency. These concerns increased following the June 2024 presidential debate between Biden and Republican Party candidate Donald Trump. Biden's debate performance was widely criticized; he lost his train of thought, had a faltering appearance, spoke with a hoarse voice, and failed to recall statistics or coherently express his opinion on several occasions. While he insisted that he would continue his campaign, Biden subsequently faced calls from fellow Democrats and from the editorial boards of major news outlets to withdraw from the race. By July 19, 2024, more than 30 senior Democrats had called for his withdrawal.

Biden ultimately ended his re-election campaign on July 21, 2024, before being officially re-nominated at the Democratic National Convention, becoming the first incumbent president to end a re-election campaign before Election Day since Lyndon B. Johnson in 1968. After adding that he would continue serving as president for the remainder of his term, Biden immediately endorsed Harris to replace him in his place as the party's presidential nominee. Harris officially became the party's presidential nominee and went on to lose the 2024 election to Trump.

== Background ==
=== Presidents of the United States who did not seek reelection for a second full term at their party's nominating convention ===
Historically, most sitting U.S. presidents who completed one full term chose to run for a second. Seven (Note: Including Joe Biden) presidents were eligible for reelection after completing at least one full term in office, but chose not to run before their party's nominating convention.

=== Incumbent presidents of the United States who were denied their party's nomination at the convention while running for a second term ===
Historically, the only elected U.S. president to be denied their party's nomination at the national convention while they were running for re-election to a second term was Franklin Pierce, a Democrat, who was in office from 1853 through 1857. Pierce lost the nomination at the convention to fellow Democrat James Buchanan, who went on to win the 1856 United States presidential election. Additionally, four other incumbent U.S. presidents, John Tyler, Millard Fillmore, Andrew Johnson, and Chester A. Arthur, were denied their party's nomination at the national convention when they ran for a second term; however, none of these presidents were elected for their first term, and all had assumed the presidency after the death of the previous incumbent.

=== Biden's age and health concerns ===
Biden was 78 years old at his inauguration, making him the oldest individual to assume the presidency. Biden was also older when he assumed the office than Ronald Reagan, the previous oldest, had been when leaving it. Health concerns surrounding Biden emerged during his presidency, primarily about his age and ability to carry out a second term. In a report in the Journal on Active Aging, doctors noted he had an "exceptional health profile" relative to his age, and a medical assessment performed by physician Kevin O'Connor attested to his physical acuity. Biden's aides dismissed age-related concerns as politically motivated attacks by Republicans.

On July 28, 2022, U.S. Representative Dean Phillips became the first incumbent Democratic member of Congress to say President Biden should not run for re-election; Phillips called for "generational change," pointing to Biden's age. Phillips argued during his 2024 presidential campaign that President Biden would be a weak general election candidate due to his age and low approval ratings. In public, Phillips was ridiculed. In private, others in the Democratic Party shared his concerns.

In February 2024, upon concluding the investigation into Biden's handling of classified documents, special counsel Robert Hur suggested that Biden would be able to present himself to a jury as an "elderly man with poor memory". Based on his interview of Biden, Hur wrote that Biden's memory "appeared to have significant limitations". According to a February 2024 poll, Biden's age and health were major or moderate concerns for 86% of voters generally, up from 76% earlier in 2020. According to another 2024 poll, most of those who voted for Biden in 2020 said that they believed he was too old to be an effective president; The New York Times noted that these concerns "cut across generations, gender, race and education".

== Biden 2024 campaign ==
On April 25, 2023, after months of speculation, Biden confirmed that he would run for reelection to the presidency in the 2024 presidential election with Vice President Kamala Harris as his running mate.

Biden faced opposition from Representative Dean Phillips during the 2024 Democratic Party presidential primaries. Phillips campaigned as a younger alternative to Biden, arguing that he would be a stronger opponent to Trump. On March 6, 2024, Phillips suspended his campaign and endorsed Biden.

=== Debate with Trump ===
Biden and Trump faced each other in a televised debate on June 27, 2024. Described as a "disaster" for Biden, the debate reinforced concerns about Biden's age. Biden appeared confused and disoriented during the debate's first half and gave meandering answers to questions. He failed to recall statistics or coherently express his opinion on several occasions.

Politico described Biden's performance as follows:

The alarm bells for Democrats started ringing the second Biden started speaking in a haltingly hoarse voice. Minutes into the debate, he struggled to mount an effective defense of the economy on his watch and flubbed the description of key health initiatives he’s made central to his reelection bid... He repeatedly mixed up “billion” and “million,” and found himself stuck for long stretches of the 90-minute debate playing defense.

And when he wasn’t speaking, he stood frozen behind his podium, mouth agape, his eyes wide and unblinking for long stretches of time.

=== Debate aftermath ===
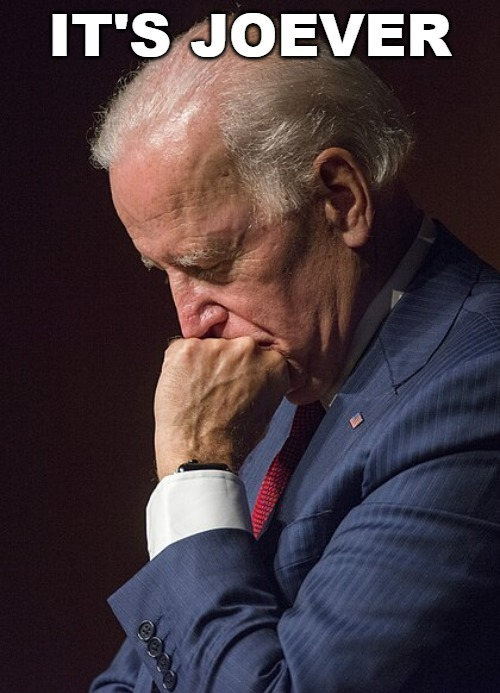
An example of the Joever meme

The debate sent many Democrats "into a panic". The resulting political turmoil within the Democratic Party was referred to as the "Biden crisis". Politico's article on the debate was entitled, "Dems freak out over Biden’s debate performance: 'Biden is toast'". Prior to Biden's withdrawal, the word Joever, a portmanteau of Joe and over, was used by critics and media to describe the state of Biden's campaign. (Note: Attributed to multiple references:) Though the word was first coined in a meme on 4chan's /pol/ imageboard in 2020, the word's usage in social media posts and major media stories increased significantly following the debate.

Following the debate, Biden faced calls from fellow Democrats and from the editorial boards of major news outlets to withdraw from the race. On July 2, Representative Lloyd Doggett (D-TX) became the first sitting Democrat in Congress to call on Biden to drop out after the debate. He said, “Unlike Trump, Biden really does want to put the country first. He can put the country first by putting himself aside.” However, former President Bill Clinton, former President Barack Obama, Vice President Kamala Harris, Senate Democratic Leader Chuck Schumer, and California Gov. Gavin Newsom publicly defended Biden and supported his continued candidacy.

On July 3, twenty Democratic governors met with Biden at the White House and virtually to discuss the debate's effect on his campaign. Following the meeting, Governors Wes Moore of Maryland, Kathy Hochul of New York, and Tim Walz of Minnesota spoke to the press outside of the White House, with Walz specifically admitting that "Thursday night was a bad performance" and a "bad hit".

Biden stated in an ABC News interview with George Stephanopoulos on July 5 that he would not end his candidacy unless "the Lord Almighty came down and said, 'Joe, get out of the race'". He added, "The Lord Almighty's not coming down." According to Politico, "Members of Congress and top Democratic operatives" said that "the president was more energetic and forceful than he was on stage during last week's showdown with Donald Trump — but it likely won't be enough to tame the panic" concerning his campaign.

On July 8, 2024, The Wall Street Journal reported that Biden's team had limited his schedule, personal interactions, media appearances, interviews, and unscripted exchanges in order to minimize concerns about his age and mental acuity. According to Newsweek, the Wall Street Journal report stated that Biden "was having 'good and bad days' as far back as 2021".

The Biden campaign attempted to reduce the intensity of the pressure on Biden to withdraw from the race until he could be formally nominated in a virtual roll call vote prior to the Democratic National Convention. In a sports analogy, this effort was described as "running out the clock".

On July 11, 2024 at the NATO summit, Biden mistakenly introduced Ukrainian President Volodymyr Zelenskyy as "'President Putin'". He then corrected himself. (Vladimir Putin is the president of Russia, with whom Ukraine was at war at the time.) Later at the same event, Biden confused his running mate with his opponent. When asked a question on Vice President Kamala Harris' chances to beat Trump if she became the Democratic presidential candidate, he responded, "'Look, I wouldn't have picked Vice President Trump to be vice president [if I didn't] think she was not qualified to be president'".

On July 12, a group of two dozen former House Democrats and a former Senate Democrat sent a letter to President Biden calling for him to step aside and to allow for an “open convention” in the summer to decide the 2024 ticket.

On July 17, ABC News reported that House Minority Leader Hakeem Jeffries and Senate Majority Leader Chuck Schumer had met with Biden on July 12 and 13, respectively, and had expressed concerns to Biden about potential Democratic losses in Congress that could result from the continuation of his campaign. Biden reportedly told Schumer that he needed another week to make a decision.

Later on July 17, Biden tested positive for COVID-19. He experienced mild symptoms, including a cough, runny nose, and "general malaise". However, images of him looking frail exiting from Air Force One on the way to isolation at his residence in Rehoboth Beach, Delaware, fueled further speculation over his health. The New York Times reported that Biden was "more receptive" to withdrawing his nomination. In phone conversations, former House speaker Nancy Pelosi told Biden she was pessimistic about his candidacy.

By July 19, 2024, more than 30 congressional Democrats had publicly called on Biden to end his presidential campaign. Many more had communicated the same message privately.

CNN reported that on July 20, Biden met with advisors Steve Ricchetti and Mike Donilon. During that meeting, the group concluded that worsening poll numbers and a loss of party support had left the campaign without a plausible path to victory. That evening, Biden began planning a possible exit from the race with Ricchetti, Donilon, and other close aides, and he fully committed to the decision on the morning of July 21.

== Biden's withdrawal and replacement ==
Biden addressing his withdrawal, July 24, 2024

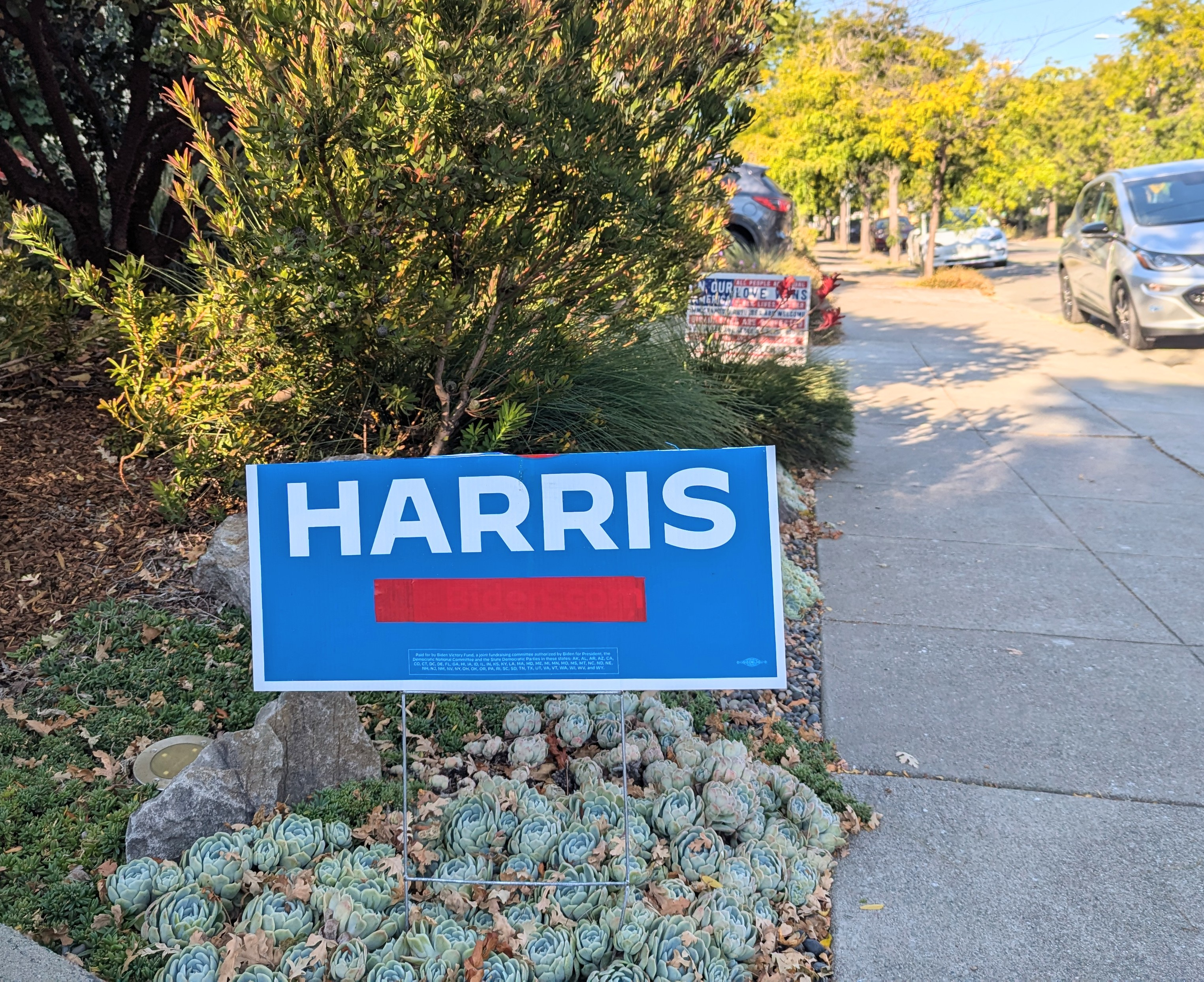
A Biden/Harris yard sign with Biden's name removed, in Oakland, CA, the day after Biden withdrew

On July 21, 2024, Biden released a letter announcing the withdrawal of his presidential candidacy. In the letter, he wrote, "It has been the greatest honor of my life to serve as your President. And while it has been my intention to seek reelection, I believe it is in the best interest of my party and the country for me to stand down and to focus solely on fulfilling my duties as President for the remainder of my term". Biden thanked his supporters and set forth various areas in which he believed that the nation had made progress during his administration. He concluded, "I believe today what I always have: that there is nothing America can’t do – when we do it together. We just have to remember we are the United States of America".

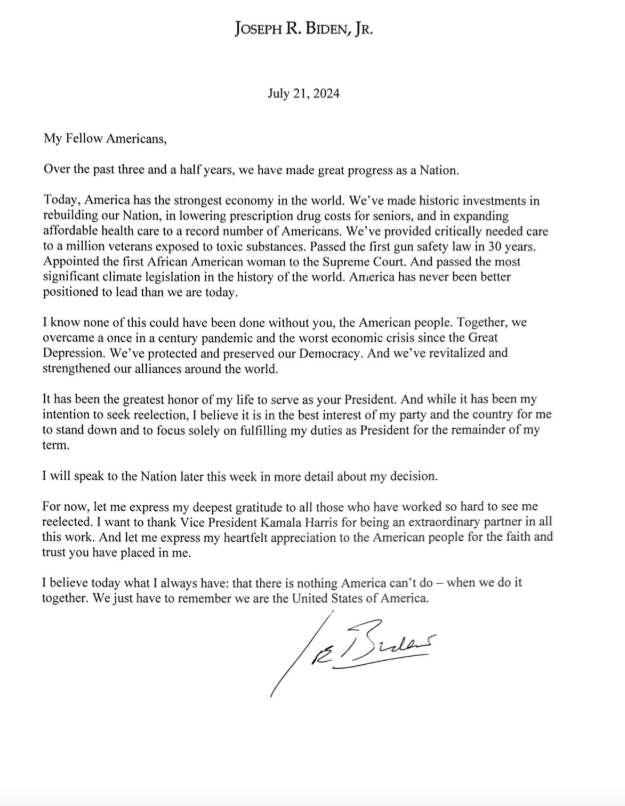
Joe Biden's full letter announcing the end of his 2024 reelection bid

Biden's announcement "was met with a rash of statements from Democrats praising his leadership. It also set off a palpable wave of relief among many in the party, including those who feared that his staying on the ticket could jeopardize the party’s chances in down-ballot races". California Gov. Gavin Newsom called Biden "'an extraordinary, history-making president — a leader who has fought hard for working people and delivered astonishing results for all Americans'", adding that Biden would "'go down in history as one of the most impactful and selfless presidents'". In contrast, Republican House Speaker Mike Johnson responded, "'If Joe Biden is not fit to run for president, he is not fit to serve as President. He must resign the office immediately'".

Nearly 30 minutes after he withdrew from the race, Biden immediately endorsed Vice President Kamala Harris to replace him in his place as the party's presidential nominee. Biden is the first incumbent president since Lyndon B. Johnson in 1968 to withdraw from the race.

On July 24, 2024, in his first appearance since withdrawing from the presidential race, Biden explained his decision. Speaking from the Oval Office, he stated that his reason was the "defense of democracy". Addressing the presidential campaigns, he remarked, "America's going to have to choose between moving forward or backward, between hope and hate, between unity and division".

Biden's pledged delegates were released by virtue of his exit from the race. In a survey of delegates by the Associated Press on July 22, 2024, Harris became the presumptive Democratic presidential nominee after receiving pledges from more than half of the delegates.

On August 5, 2024, Harris officially become the party's presidential nominee after securing the support of 99% of delegates voting in a virtual roll call.

== Later developments ==
After securing the Democratic presidential nomination, Harris went on to lose the general election to Trump. Following Trump's victory, many analysts argued that Biden's decision to run for re-election was a significant factor in the loss of Harris. Jon Favreau of Pod Save America reported that internal polls by Biden's campaign before his withdrawal found that Trump would win 400 electoral votes against Biden. Former Speaker of the House Nancy Pelosi suggested that the Democrats would have fared better if Biden had withdrawn from the race sooner. U.S. Representative Lloyd Doggett, who was the first sitting Democrat in Congress to openly call for President Joe Biden to withdraw from the 2024 election after the first presidential debate, stated regarding his call for Biden's withdrawal that, "I only regret I didn't do it earlier ... I believe that the only person in our caucus who doesn't share some responsibility for the outcome is Dean Phillips, who came out early." A YouGov poll suggested that Trump would be seven points ahead in a race with Biden (49-42%); Trump won the popular vote 49.8-48.3% against Harris. To the contrary, Newsweek suggested that Biden would have appealed to more union voters and men than Harris did.

In December 2024, Biden expressed regret for his decision to drop out of the race and added that he believed he could have beaten Trump. In a January 2025 interview, Biden reasserted his belief that he would have won the 2024 election, but added that he doubted if he would have had the vigor to complete four more years in the White House. The Wall Street Journal reported later that month that Biden's claims had caused a rift between him and Harris. In his first major interview since leaving office, given to BBC News in May 2025, Biden stated that he doesn't think withdrawing earlier would’ve helped Democrats beat Trump. In June 2026, former Secretary of State and 2016 Democratic presidential nominee Hillary Clinton stated during an interview with David Remnick of The New Yorker, that Mr. Biden had made a “terrible mistake for himself, his legacy and for the country” in trying to run again at age 81.

== Political responses ==
=== In the United States ===
==== Democratic Party ====
Former presidents Bill Clinton and Barack Obama praised Biden's work as president, with Obama writing that "Joe Biden has been one of America's most consequential presidents" and that Biden "wouldn't make this decision unless he believed it was right for America". Many Democrats praised Biden's decision as "selfless", such as South Carolina Congressman Jim Clyburn, Obama advisor David Axelrod, and Ohio Congressman Greg Landsman, with Senate Majority Leader Chuck Schumer writing that Biden "once again put his country, his party, and our future first" over himself. Former Secretary of State and presidential candidate Hillary Clinton did the same and endorsed Harris.

==== Trump campaign ====
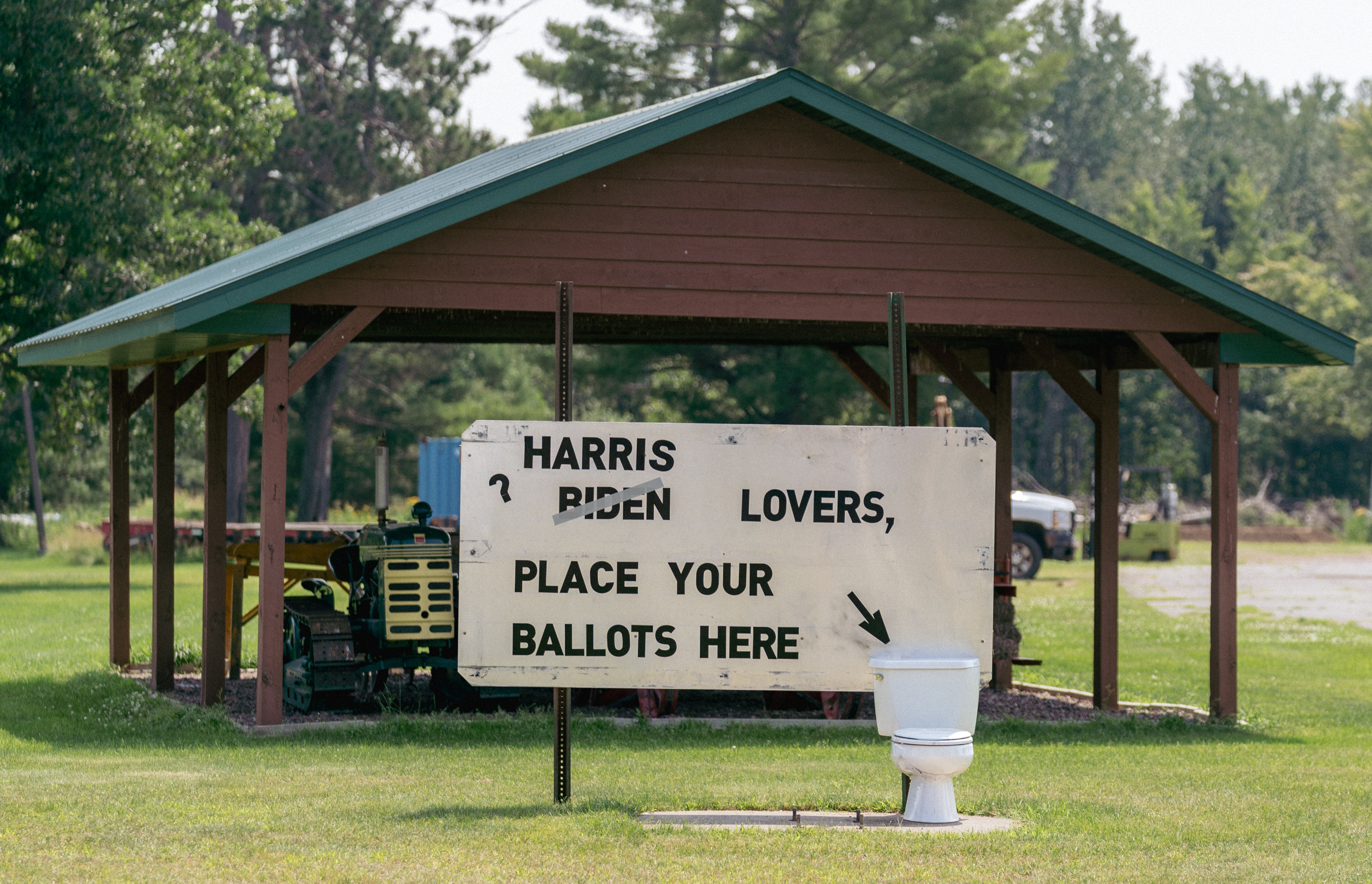
Anti-Biden sign in Willow River, Minnesota, modified to be anti-Harris instead

Following the announcement of Biden's withdrawal, Trump released a statement on Truth Social, his social media platform, arguing that his former opponent "was not fit to run for President, and is certainly not fit to serve", calling him "the worst president, by far, in the history of our nation". Trump's re-election campaign had prepared opposition research dossiers on Kamala Harris and Pennsylvania governor Josh Shapiro, who were viewed as a potential replacement ticket for Biden should he withdraw. The campaign intended to release messaging critical of Harris at the 2024 Republican National Convention, but ultimately decided against it.

Trump complained about Biden's withdrawal in a July 21 Truth Social post and requested that the Republican Party should be reimbursed for the money they spent campaigning against Biden. Trump also compared the Democratic Party's support of replacing Biden to a "coup". Trump's language of "coup" was widely imitated by other Republican politicians and strategists and in an op-ed by Josh Hammer, a senior editor of Newsweek.

=== International response ===
Australia: Prime Minister Anthony Albanese praised Biden, saying he "has presided over an economy that has seen jobs grow, that has seen wages increase, and that has seen the transition proceed that is occurring as the world moves towards net zero. As well as he's standing up on issues such as gender equality. President Biden has been a great friend of Australia and that will continue", also stating that the "Australia–US Alliance has never been stronger with our shared commitment to democratic values, international security, economic prosperity and climate action for this and future generations".

Brazil: President Luiz Inácio Lula da Silva said of Biden, "Only he could decide whether or not he would be a candidate" and "...Brazil's relationship will be with whoever is elected".

Canada: Prime Minister Justin Trudeau said: "I've known President Biden for years. He's a great man, and everything he does is guided by his love for his country. As President, he is a partner to Canadians—and a true friend. To President Biden and the First Lady: thank you".

China: At a regular press briefing on July 22, the Chinese Foreign Ministry spokesperson Mao Ning declined to comment, and said the "presidential election is an internal affair of the United States".

Czech Republic: Prime Minister Petr Fiala stated: "It is undoubtedly the decision of a statesman who has served his country for decades. It is a responsible and personally difficult step, but it is all the more valuable. I am keeping my fingers crossed for the USA that a good president emerges from the democratic competition of two strong and equal candidates".

France: In a letter, President Emmanuel Macron praised Biden's "courage, spirit of responsibility and sense of duty that led [him] to this decision".

Germany: Chancellor Olaf Scholz posted a statement on Twitter, stating "Joe Biden has achieved a great deal: for his country, for Europe, for the world... Thanks to him, transatlantic cooperation is close, NATO is strong and the USA is a good and reliable partner for us. His decision not to run again deserves recognition".

Ireland: In a statement, Taoiseach Simon Harris issued thanks to Biden, saying: "On behalf of the people and government of Ireland. I ... would like to thank you Mr President for your global leadership and your friendship as you make your announcement that you will not stand in the 2024 US Presidential election... Joe Biden, in all the offices he has held, has always been an unwavering voice and passionate worker for peace on the island of Ireland and our country owes him a great debt for this". Tánaiste Micheál Martin said he heard of Biden's decision "with both sadness and admiration... This has no doubt been the toughest of calls, but one done, as ever, with dignity & class. I know that the people of Ireland will wish President Biden the very best".

Israel: President Isaac Herzog thanked Biden "for his friendship and steadfast support for the Israeli people over his decades long career", in a statement on social media, continuing: "As the first US President to visit Israel in wartime, as a recipient of the Israeli Presidential Medal of Honor, and as a true ally of the Jewish people, he is a symbol of the unbreakable bond between our two peoples". Defense Minister Yoav Gallant said: "Thank you President Joe Biden, for your unwavering support of Israel over the years. Your steadfast backing, especially during the war, has been invaluable. We are grateful for your leadership and friendship".

Japan: Prime Minister Fumio Kishida said that Biden made the best political decision and that, "Needless to say, the Japan–U.S. alliance is the pillar of Japan's diplomacy and security, so we'll closely watch the future developments".

Mexico: President Andrés Manuel López Obrador described Biden as a "good leader" with "very good results". He added: "Politically, he makes the decision not to participate in reelection, that is up to those who are members of the Democratic Party to decide, we are going to continue seeking to maintain a good relationship with the United States government".

New Zealand: Prime Minister Christopher Luxon stated: "President Biden has dedicated his life to public service, and that is something that deserves much respect. I thank the President for his leadership of the United States and his commitment to New Zealand. And I look forward to working with him for the remainder of his presidency".

Norway: Prime Minister Jonas Gahr Støre told Reuters: "I respect President Joe Biden's decision not to run for re-election. He justifies the decision by saying that he wants to put the country before himself. That reasoning commands respect... Joe Biden has been one of America's most prominent politicians over several decades, and a president who has carried out several important reforms. I particularly commend him for his leadership in NATO and look forward to working with Biden as the president of the United States until the end of January".

Philippines: President Bongbong Marcos described Biden's withdrawal as "a demonstration of genuine statesmanship" and thanked him for his "constant and unwavering support for the Philippines in a delicate and difficult time".

Poland: Prime Minister Donald Tusk said on X: "Mr. President @JoeBiden, many times you have made difficult decisions that have made Poland, America, and the world safer, and democracy and freedom stronger. I know that you were guided by the same principles when announcing your latest decision. Perhaps the most difficult one in your life".

Russia: Kremlin spokesperson Dmitry Peskov stated that Russia was more focused on its goals in the ongoing invasion of Ukraine than the results of the election.

Spain: Prime Minister Pedro Sánchez on X stated: "All my admiration and recognition for the brave and dignified decision of the president @JoeBiden. Thanks to its determination and leadership, the US overcame the economic crisis after the pandemic and the serious assault on the Capitol and has been exemplary in its support for Ukraine in the face of Putin's Russian aggression. A great gesture from a great president who has always fought for democracy and freedom".

Ukraine: President Volodymyr Zelenskyy expressed gratitude on behalf of Ukraine for Biden's "unwavering support for Ukraine's fight for freedom", and that "[m]any strong decisions have been made in recent years and they will be remembered as bold steps taken by President Biden in response to challenging times. And we respect today's tough but strong decision."

United Kingdom: Prime Minister Sir Keir Starmer published a statement on Twitter, saying that he respects Biden's decision to drop out, and looks forward to working with him during the remainder of his presidency. Leader of the Opposition and former Prime Minister Rishi Sunak also remarked on Biden's accomplishments and wished him well.

Venezuela: President Nicolás Maduro said at a campaign event that Biden "made the most sensible and correct decision ... He prioritized his family and his health. He realized that at that age and with weakened health he could not assume the reins of his country, let alone a presidential candidacy".

== Legacy ==
Biden's withdrawal was very similar to Lyndon B. Johnson’s withdrawal from the 1968 presidential election 56 years earlier. Johnson in 1964 and Biden in 2020 had won convincing victories, but their approval ratings declined over the course of their presidencies. Biden had age and health concerns during his presidency, and withdrew after the 2024 Joe Biden–Donald Trump presidential debate.

In both cases, their vice presidents—Hubert Humphrey and Kamala Harris, lost to a former losing Republican presidential nominee—Richard Nixon and Donald Trump, who successfully won the presidential election. Humphrey lost the popular vote by 0.7% in 1968, and Harris lost the popular vote by 1.5% in 2024. Coincidentally, the Democratic National Conventions in both years were held in Chicago, and the presidential elections of 1968 and 2024 took place on November 5. The one main difference was that there was no major third-party candidate in 2024, unlike George Wallace in 1968.
