= Presidential transition of Barack Obama =

Transfer of presidential power from George W. Bush to Barack Obama

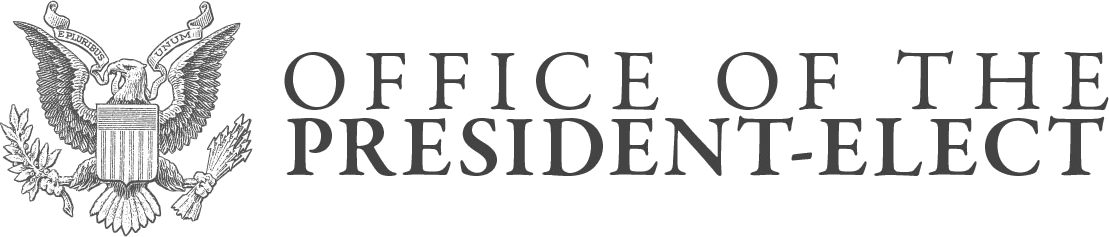

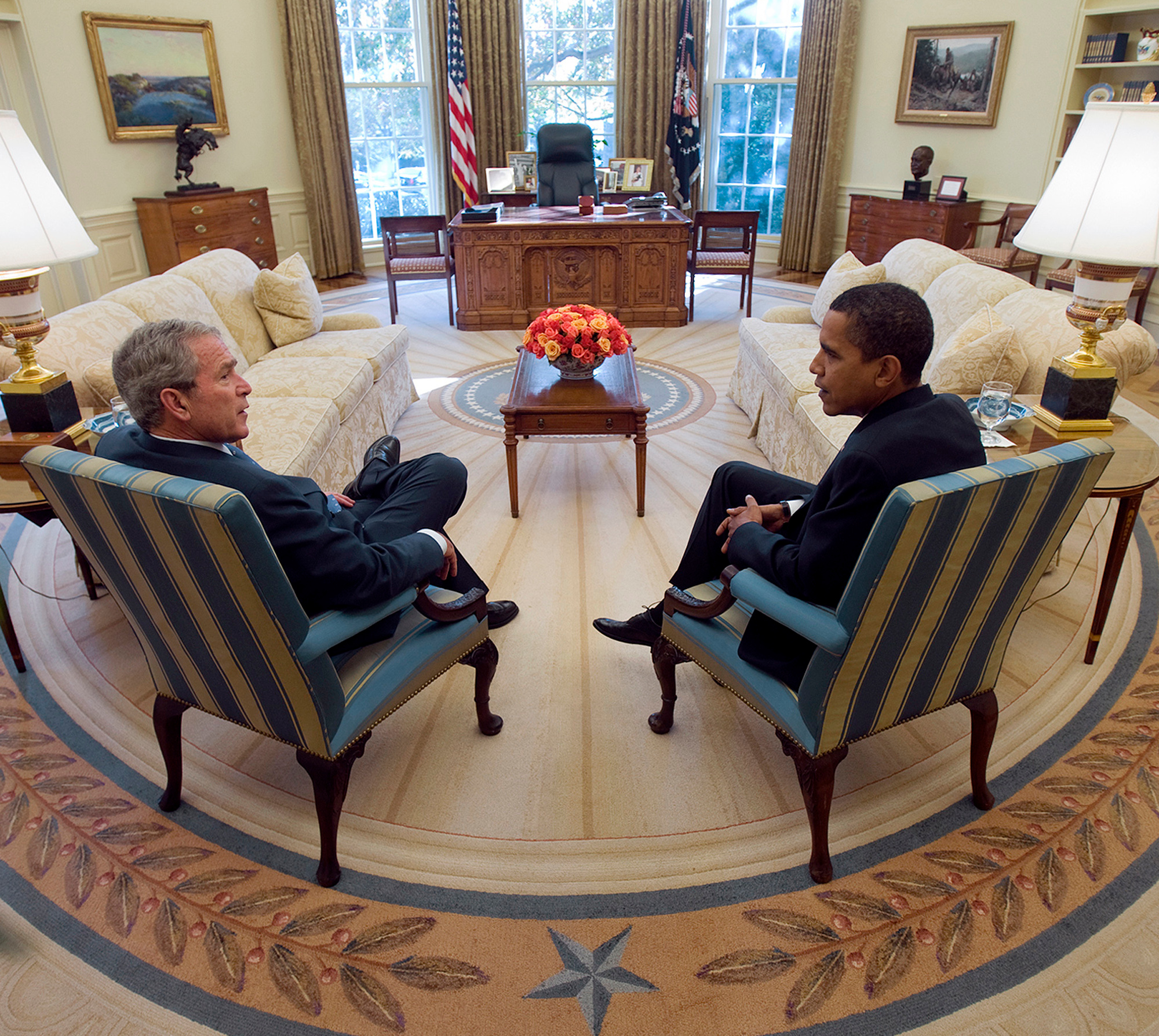
- President George W. Bush (left) meeting with President-elect Barack Obama (right) in the Oval Office of the White House on November 10, 2008.
- Election date: November 4, 2008
- Inauguration date: January 20, 2009
- President-elect: Barack Obama (Democrat)
- Vice president-elect: Joe Biden (Democrat)
- Outgoing president: George W. Bush (Republican)
- Outgoing vice president: Dick Cheney (Republican)
- Headquarters: Chicago, Illinois and Washington, D.C.
- Executive Director: Chris Lu
- Staff: 450
- Website: http://change.gov/

Barack Obama's presidential transition began when he won the United States presidential election on November 4, 2008, and became the president-elect. Obama was formally elected by the Electoral College on December 15, 2008. The results were certified by a joint session of Congress on January 8, 2009, and the transition ended when Obama was inaugurated on January 20, 2009.

== Organization of the transition ==
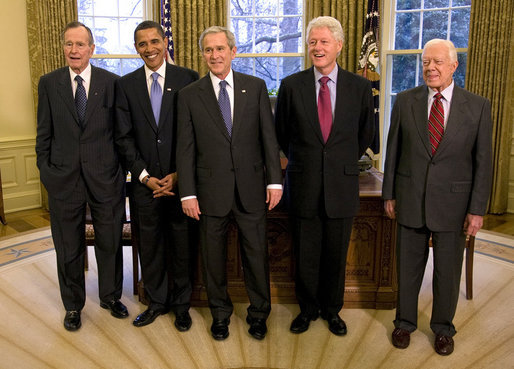
Living presidents George W. Bush, George H. W. Bush, Bill Clinton, Jimmy Carter, and President-elect Barack Obama at the White House Oval Office on January 7, 2009

The Obama transition organization was called the Obama-Biden Transition Project. The transition team was convened during the height of the campaign, well before the outcome could be known, to begin making preparations for a potential administration. It was co-chaired by John Podesta, who was Bill Clinton's fourth and last White House chief of staff and the president/chief executive officer of the Center for American Progress, Valerie Jarrett, who is one of Obama's longest-serving advisers, and Pete Rouse, former Senate chief of staff for Tom Daschle who succeeded Rahm Emanuel as Obama's chief of staff.

On November 5, the General Services Administration declared that Obama was the "apparent winner," making him eligible to receive transition funding and other government services, and granting him access to their 2008 presidential transition headquarters in Washington, D.C. Podesta estimated that the transition would employ approximately 450 people and have a budget of about $12 million: $5.2 million would be paid by the federal government and the remaining $6.8 million would be funded by private sources, with each contribution limited to $5,000. The transition project would not accept money from political action committees or federal lobbyists.

=== Transition team ===
On November 5, Obama announced his complete transition team, which was organized as a nonprofit tax-exempt organization under U.S. federal tax code 501(c)(4). The advisory board consisted of Carol Browner, William M. Daley, Christopher Edley, Michael Froman, Julius Genachowski, Donald Gips, Janet Napolitano, Federico Peña, Susan Rice, Sonal Shah, Mark Gitenstein and Ted Kaufman.

General Services Administration letter to President-elect Barack Obama

Members of the transition team's senior staff included:

- Chris Lu – Executive Director
- Dan Pfeiffer – Communications Director
- Stephanie Cutter – Chief Spokesperson
- Robert Gibbs – Press Secretary
- Cassandra Butts – General Counsel
- Jim Messina – Personnel Director
- Patrick Gaspard – Associate Personnel Director
- Christine A. Varney – Personnel Counsel
- Melody Barnes – Co-director of Agency Review
- Lisa Brown – Co-director of Agency Review
- Phil Schiliro – Director of Congressional Relations
- Michael Strautmanis – Director of Public Liaison and Intergovernmental Affairs
- Katy Kale – Co-director of Operations
- Brad Kiley – Co-director of Operations

Joshua Gotbaum and Michael Warren headed the transition team of the Treasury Department. In addition, Thomas Donilon and Wendy Sherman oversaw the transition of the State Department. Seth Harris oversaw the transition in all of the labor, education, and transportation agencies with Edward B. Montgomery leading the Labor Department agency review team, Mortimer Downey leading the Transportation Department agency review team, and Judith Sherman leading the Education Department agency review team. Finally, John P. White and Michele Flournoy led the transition of the Defense Department.

== Activities as the president-elect ==
=== Bush administration ===
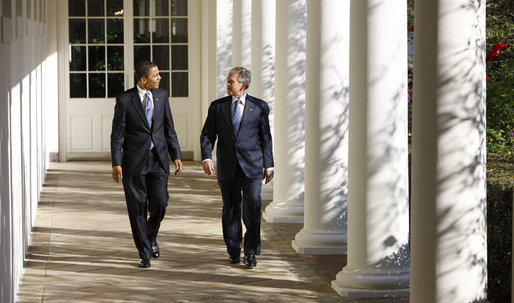
President-elect Obama walking with President Bush during their November 10 meeting

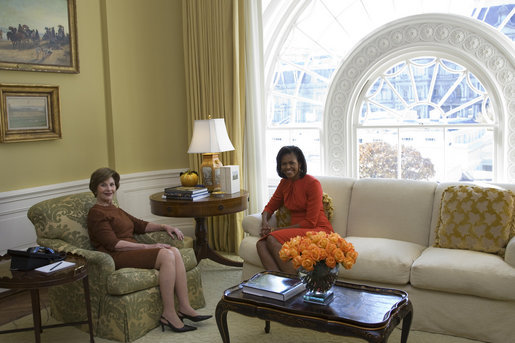
Laura Bush meets with Michelle Obama.

In mid-October, the George W. Bush administration convened a fourteen-member council to coordinate with and brief the winning campaign's transition team. The New York Times reported that White House chief of staff Joshua Bolten then planned to recruit his predecessor, Andrew Card, to oversee the activity. On November 6, Obama received his first classified intelligence briefing from director of national intelligence John Michael McConnell and Central Intelligence Agency director Michael Hayden.

President Bush invited Obama and his team to attend the 2008 G-20 Washington summit held between November 15 and 20 in order to introduce him to more than twenty world leaders who attended the event. However, Obama did not come, and his transition team instead sent former Republican Rep. Jim Leach and former Secretary of State Madeleine Albright to meet with the heads of state. Obama was expected to address a United Nations global warming summit in Poland in December or allow a representative such as Al Gore to present his policies.

On November 10, Obama traveled to the White House and met with President Bush to discuss transition issues while First Lady Laura Bush took his wife Michelle on a tour of the mansion. NBC News reported that Obama advanced his economic agenda with Bush, asking him to attempt to pass a stimulus package in a lame duck session of Congress before the inauguration. He also urged Bush to accelerate the disbursement of $25 billion in funds to bail out the automobile industry and expressed concern about additional Americans losing their homes as mortgage rates increase again.

The Bush administration reportedly went out of its way to make the transition as seamless as possible for the incoming administration, earning accolades from Obama staff members and outside experts alike. According to nearly all accounts, the Bush administration streamlined the process for new officials to obtain security clearances and planned training exercises for the incoming national security team, to ensure that they would be ready to face a possible crisis on the first day in office. Part of this enhanced cooperation is required by laws passed at the behest of the 9/11 Commission, while part is attributed to the difficulty that the Bush administration had with its own transition, which lasted only five weeks and was felt to have had a deleterious effect on Bush's ability to govern. "I'm not sure I've ever seen an outgoing administration work as hard at saying the right thing," said Stephen Hess of the Brookings Institution. "This is really quite memorable."

During the transition, the Bush administration had many important matters to address, even as a lame duck president. There was the Great Recession, and this was the first presidential transition since the presidential transition of Richard Nixon to occur while the United States was at war.

=== Resignation from Senate offices ===
At the time of their election, President-elect Obama and Vice President-elect Joe Biden were incumbent U.S. senators from Illinois and Delaware respectively. In accordance with Article I, Section 6 of the United States Constitution, both were required to resign their respective Senate seats on or before January 20, 2009, in order to become president and vice president.

==== Obama Senate transition ====
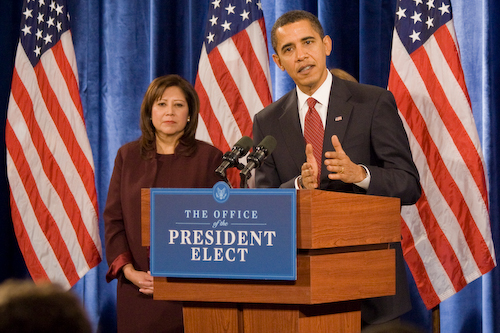
During the transition period, Obama spoke from a lectern bearing the inscription "Office of the President Elect".

Obama resigned from the Senate effective November 16, 2008. Initially, it was thought that his replacement would be named by Illinois Governor Rod Blagojevich. Since the term for the seat expired in January 2011, it would come up for its normal election in 2010 with no special election necessary. Blagojevich was expected to name Obama's immediate successor in the Senate by January 3, 2009. However, on December 9, 2008, the status of Obama's succession in the Senate was cast in doubt after Blagojevich was arrested on federal corruption charges, which included allegedly attempting to sell the appointment. Although placed in federal custody and released on $4,500 bail, as long as he remained governor Blagojevich continued to have sole authority to make the appointment. Several Democrats, including Sen. Dick Durbin, asked the Illinois General Assembly to schedule a special election instead.

Speaking through a surrogate, Obama called for Blagojevich's resignation on December 10. Had Blagojevich resigned or been removed from office before making the appointment, the duty would have fallen to Illinois Lt. Gov. Pat Quinn, who would succeed Blagojevich as governor. However, Illinois Senate president Emil Jones said that he would call the Senate back into session to write a law that would result in Obama's replacement being determined in a special election.

However, after the state legislature did not pass a law mandating a special election for the seat, on December 30, Blagojevich announced that he was appointing Roland Burris, a former Illinois Attorney General, Illinois Comptroller, and U.S. Treasury Department official, to the seat, citing his constitutional duty in the absence of a law requiring a special election. Blagojevich, Burris, and Representative Bobby Rush urged the public to consider the qualifications of Burris as a public servant and not the scandals in which Blagojevich was embroiled.

However, the Senate Democrats released a statement in which they reaffirmed that they would refuse to seat anyone appointed to the seat by Blagojevich, as that individual would be an ineffective representative of Illinois because of "questions of impropriety."

Some members of the Congressional Black Caucus, including Rush, expressed their support for seating Burris, who would be the only African-American in the Senate; Rush compared a Senate rejection of Burris to a lynching. However, President-elect Obama released a statement condemning the appointment and again calling on Blagojevich to resign. In addition, the Illinois Secretary of State, Jesse White, reiterated that he would not certify any appointment made by Blagojevich, although at the time it was not clear whether this could prevent Burris from taking office. Furthermore, the Senate might not actually have been able to refuse to seat Burris, as he met all constitutional requirements for the office and was not involved in the Blagojevich corruption scandal (per the U.S. Supreme Court decision Powell v. McCormack).

On January 9, 2009, the Illinois Supreme Court ruled in the case Burris v. White that the appointment only required the signature of the governor to be valid, and not that of the Illinois Secretary of State, and that the state of Illinois is not required to use the Senate's recommended certification form, as it is only "recommended" under the Standing Rules of the United States Senate. The Court further remarked that "no explanation has been given as to how any rule of the Senate, whether it be formal or merely a matter of tradition, could supersede the authority to fill vacancies conferred on the states by the federal constitution". Following the ruling, White provided Burris with a certified copy of the appointment's registration, and Burris delivered that copy, that bears the State Seal, to the Secretary of the Senate. His credentials declared valid, Burris was finally sworn in on January 15, 2009, by outgoing President of the Senate Dick Cheney.

==== Biden Senate transition ====
Biden had indicated that he would remain in the Senate until he was sworn in as vice president on January 20, 2009. Although he was sworn in for a seventh Senate term in early January 2009, he resigned from the seat on January 15, 2009, having served just over 36 years in the body. He was Delaware's longest-serving senator.

On November 24, 2008, Delaware Gov. Ruth Ann Minner announced that Ted Kaufman would serve as Biden's appointed replacement. Kaufman was sworn in on January 16, 2009. A special election was held in November 2010, which elected Democratic candidate Chris Coons.

During his abbreviated final term in the Senate, Biden went on a diplomatic fact-finding trip to Iraq, Afghanistan, and Pakistan, becoming the first vice-president-elect to undertake such a mission before entering office.

=== Change.gov website ===
On November 5, 2008, the transition team launched change.gov, the official website of the transition.

The website included a blog and jobs page. It also had a section that allowed visitors to share stories or their visions for the country. Visitors were able to comment on issues important to them using the Citizen's Briefing Book. Individuals applying for work within the Obama administration via this site were required to go through intensive consumer and criminal background checks performed by the ChoicePoint Corporation. The website used a Creative Commons license.

As part of their efforts towards transparency, on December 5 the transition team announced that "all policy documents from official meetings with outside organizations will be publicly available for review and discussion on Change.gov." After the inauguration, many of the functions of change.gov were transferred to a redesigned White House website.

== Administration appointments ==
Thirty-one of the appointments to the transition team had previously worked in the Clinton administration, including Podesta, chief of staff Rahm Emanuel, and Biden's chief of staff Ron Klain.

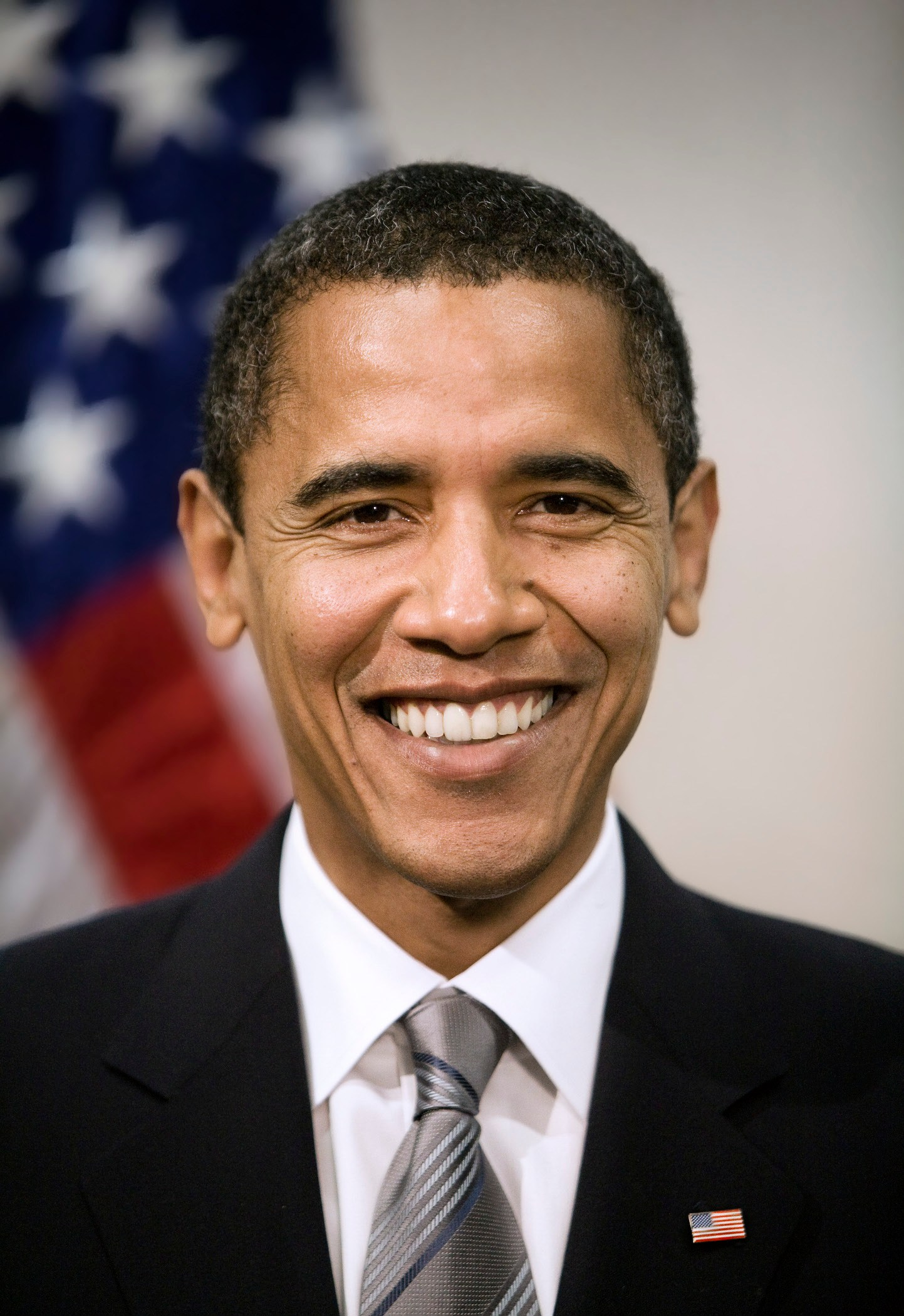
Obama's official portrait as President-elect, November 2008

=== Announcements ===
Obama held near-daily press conferences as president-elect to announce his administration nominees to the public. He introduced the nominees and occasionally took questions from the press regarding issues such as economic difficulties and the war in Afghanistan.

The appointments of Lawrence Summers and Timothy F. Geithner to key economic positions were criticized, on grounds that they had been prominently involved in creating many of the conditions that led to the 2008 financial crisis, so "failure is being rewarded." Summers was a leading advocate of the derivatives deregulation, together with Alan Greenspan and Robert Rubin, and during his transition to Secretary of the Treasury, the act that kept commercial banks out of Wall Street, the Glass–Steagall Act, was repealed. Geithner instead was criticized for his failure to pay $34,000 in income taxes.

The appointment of Eric Holder for attorney general raised concerns, due to his role in the last-minute pardon issued by Bill Clinton for fugitive financier Marc Rich.

During his first press conference as president-elect, on November 7, Obama remarked about former first lady Nancy Reagan holding seances in the White House, which gained widespread attention. Termed his "first gaffe," Obama called Mrs. Reagan later that evening to apologize for what his spokesperson said was a "careless and off-handed remark."

- Chief of staff: Representative Rahm Emanuel of Illinois was selected by President-elect Obama on November 6, two days after the election.
- Deputy Chiefs of Staff: Jim Messina, current director of personnel for the Obama Transition team and former chief of staff to Senator Max Baucus; and Mona Sutphen, a former career foreign service officer who worked for President Clinton's National Security Council.
- Senior Advisors to the President: Campaign strategist David Axelrod and Pete Rouse, who has been serving as Obama's Senate chief of staff.
- Senior Advisor and Assistant to the President for Intergovernmental Relations and Public Liaison: Valerie Jarrett, a lawyer who served as Chicago's planning commissioner and later was chairperson of the Chicago Transit Authority. In 1995, Jarrett left public service to join the Habitat Corporation, a Chicago real estate management company.
- Assistant to the President for Legislative Affairs: Phil Schiliro.
- White House Counsel: Greg Craig.
- Cabinet Secretary: Chris Lu, former legislative director of Obama's Senate office.
- Staff Secretary: Lisa Brown, executive director of the American Constitution Society.
- Press Secretary: Robert Gibbs, announced on November 22.
- Communications Director: Ellen Moran.
- Deputy Director of Communications: Dan Pfeiffer.
- Chair of the White House Council on Environmental Quality: Nancy Sutley, a well-known member of the LGBT community, and Deputy Mayor of Los Angeles.
- Deputy Director of White House Office of Health Reform: Jeanne Lambrew.
- White House photographer: Pete Souza.

=== Cabinet and top advisors ===
There was one withdrawal, New Mexico Governor Bill Richardson, whom Obama had named Secretary of Commerce. Richardson's administration was, at the time, the subject of a federal corruption probe; while maintaining that his administration was responsible for no wrongdoing, he withdrew so as to prevent a lengthy confirmation process from hindering the work of the U.S. Department of Commerce. The position was filled by Gary Locke.

Obama named Tim Kaine as new chairman of the Democratic National Committee, replacing Howard Dean (who had clashed with Obama and his advisors in the past). Kaine served concurrently as Governor of Virginia until his term ended in January 2010.

Obama named Aneesh Chopra for the new position of Chief Technology Officer of the United States, Vivek Kundra as Chief Information Officer and Jeffrey Zients Chief Performance Officer and deputy director for management of the Office of Management and Budget

Initial reaction to Obama's choice of Leon Panetta as CIA director was mixed, with some intelligence professionals expressing concern that Panetta lacked specific intelligence experience, and others such as former Congressman and co-chair of the Iraq Study Group Lee H. Hamilton praising the choice.

==== Domestic policy ====
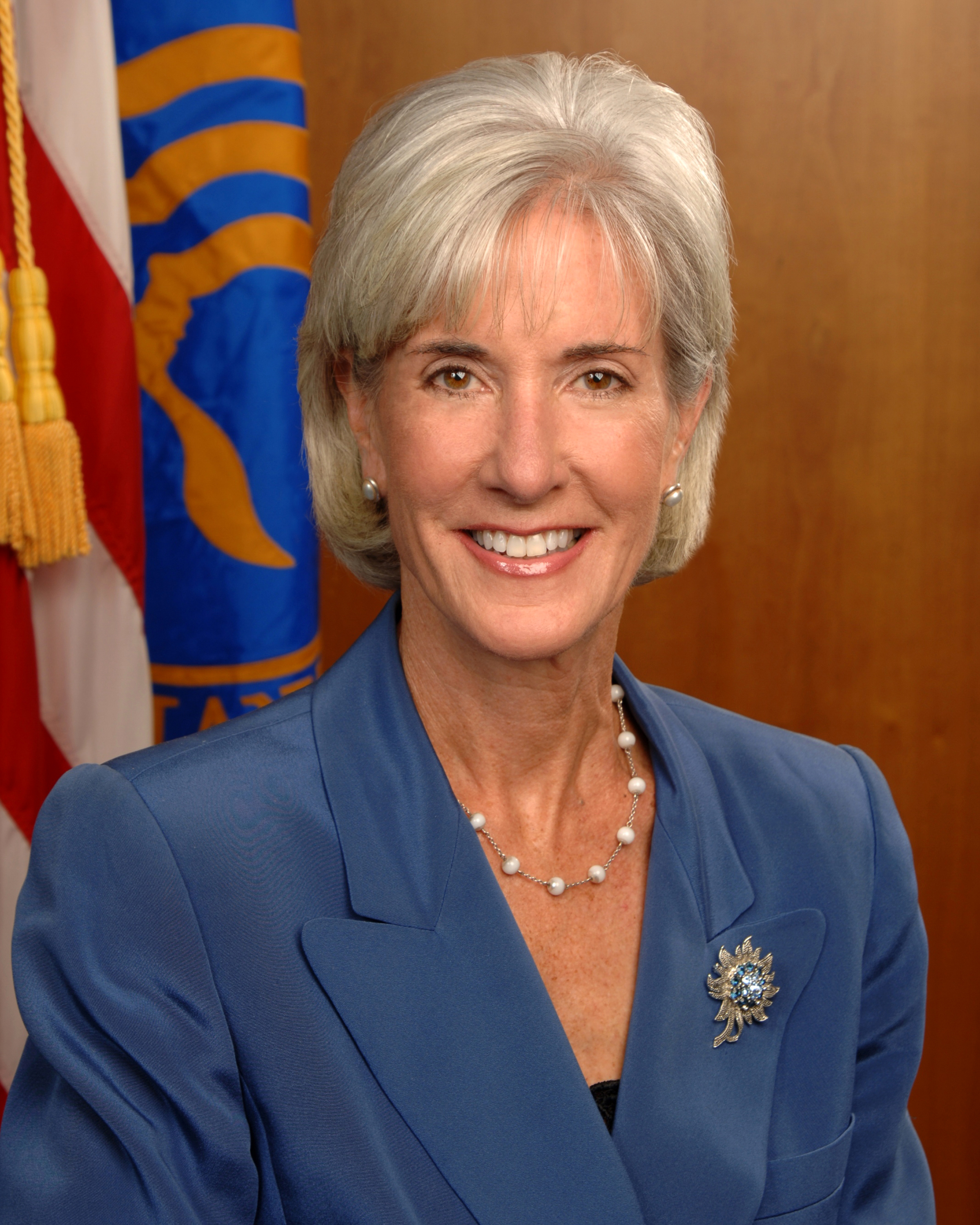
Kathleen Sebelius
Secretary of Health and Human Services
(announced February 28, 2009)

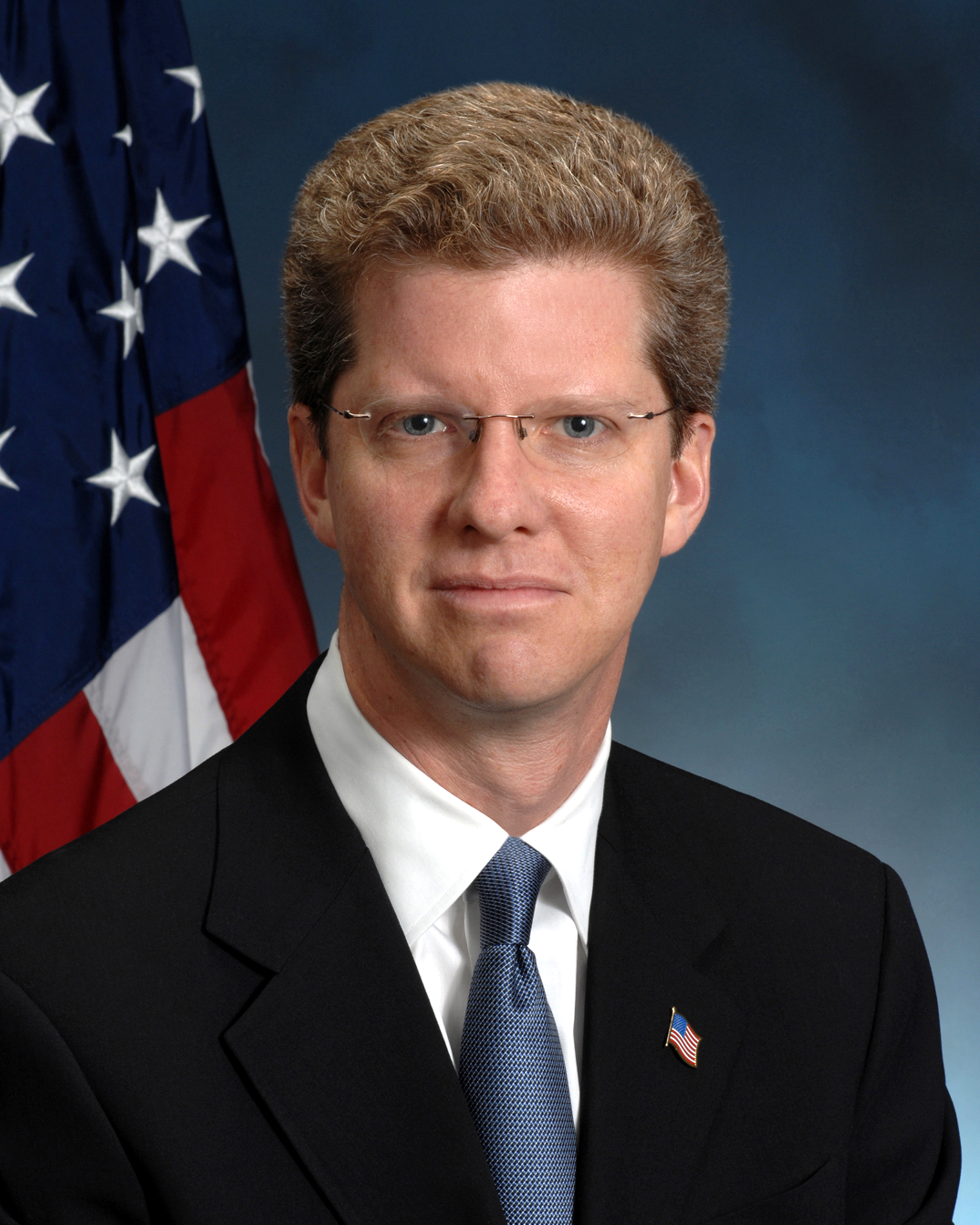
Shaun Donovan
Secretary of Housing and Urban Development
(announced December 13, 2008)

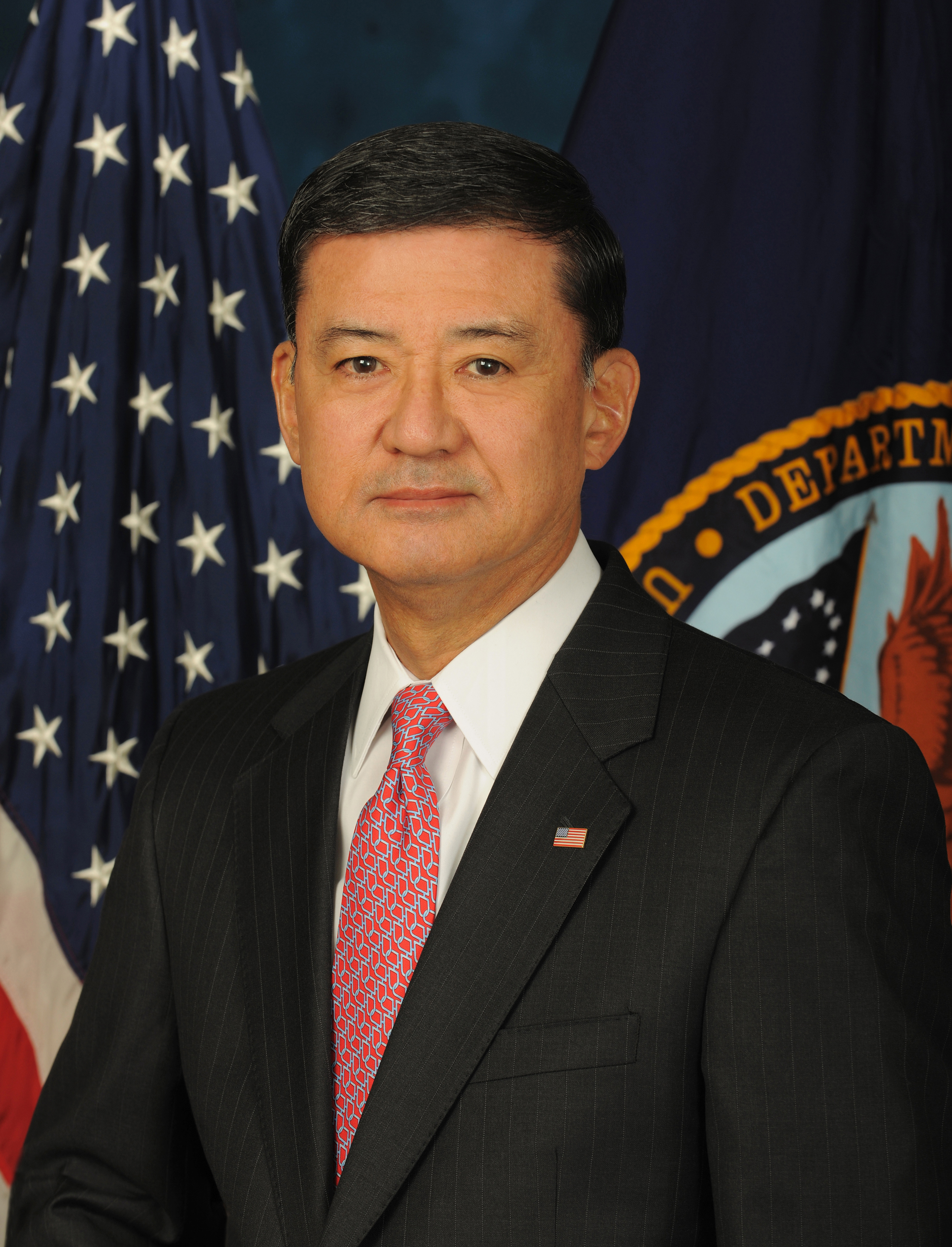
Eric Shinseki
Secretary of Veterans Affairs
(announced December 7, 2008)

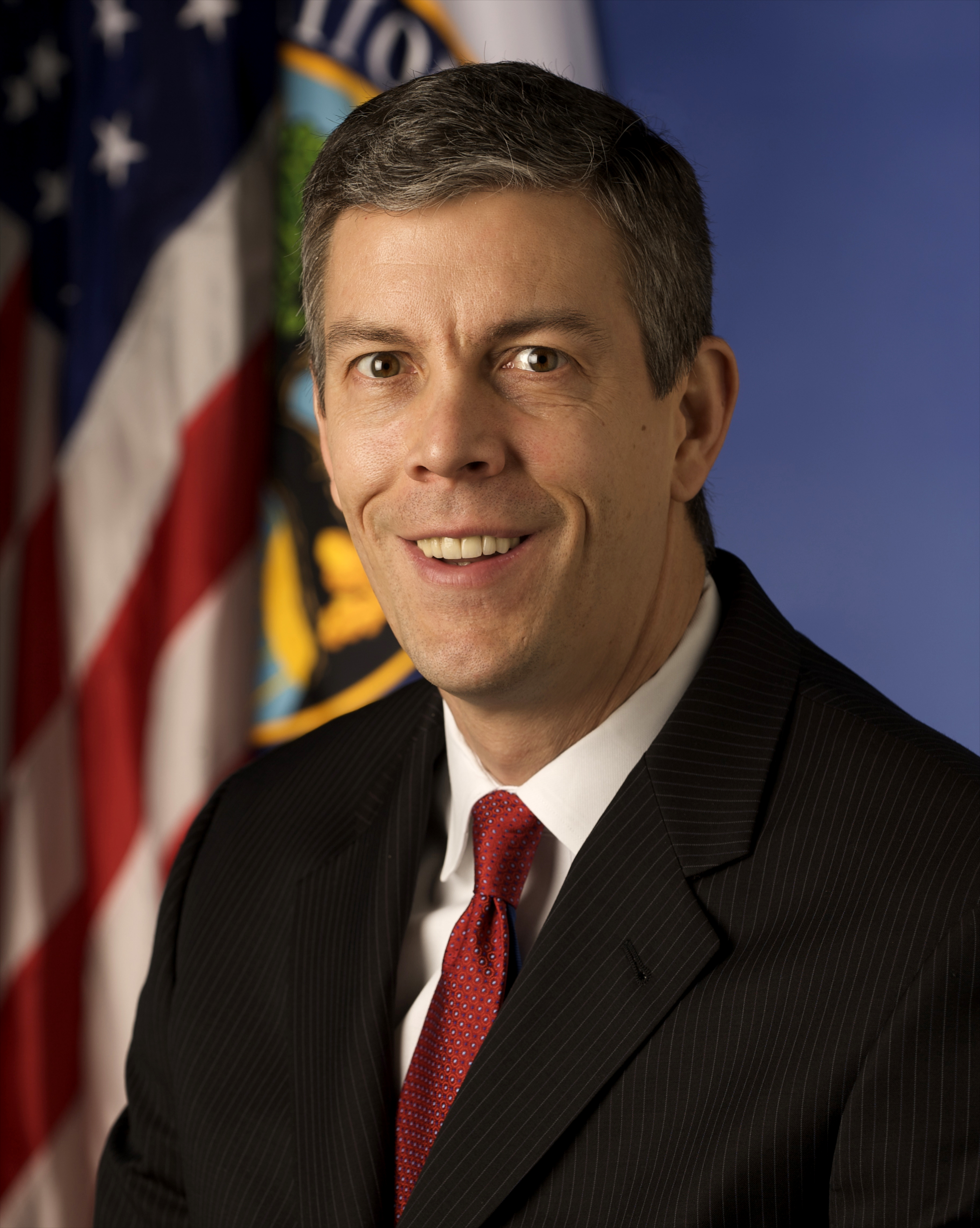
Arne Duncan
Secretary of Education
(announced December 16, 2008)

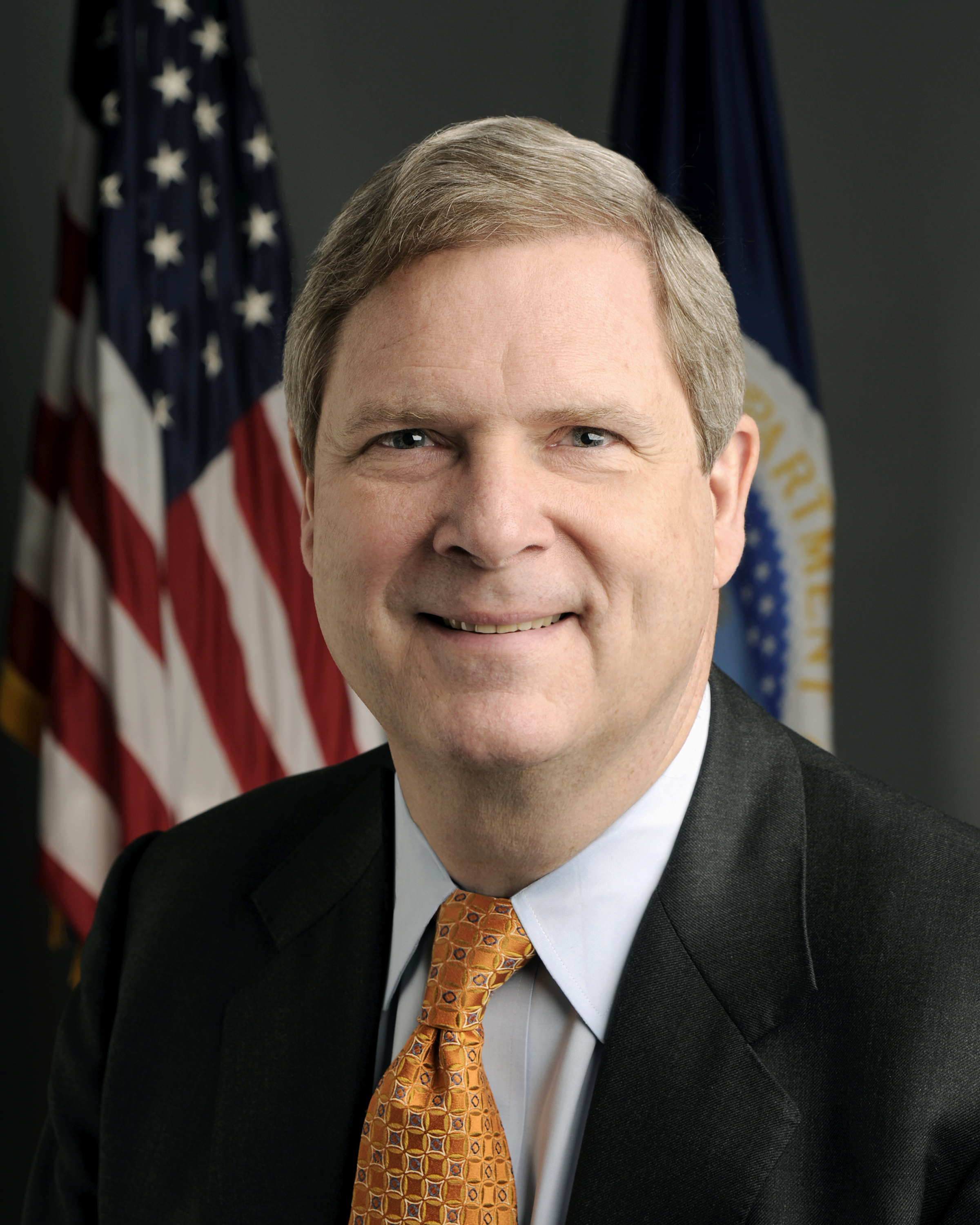
Tom Vilsack
Secretary of Agriculture
(announced December 17, 2008)

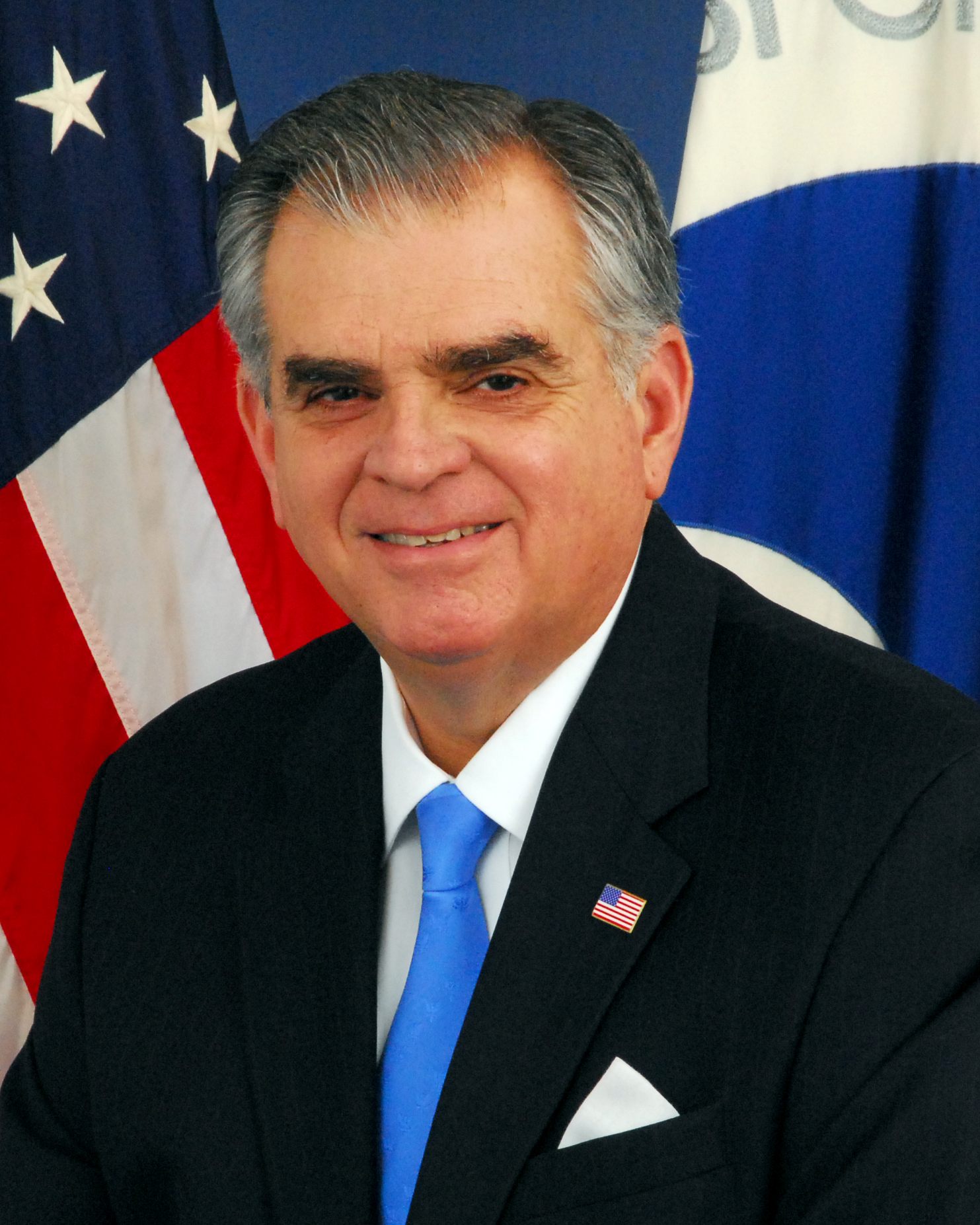
Ray LaHood
Secretary of Transportation
(announced December 19, 2008)

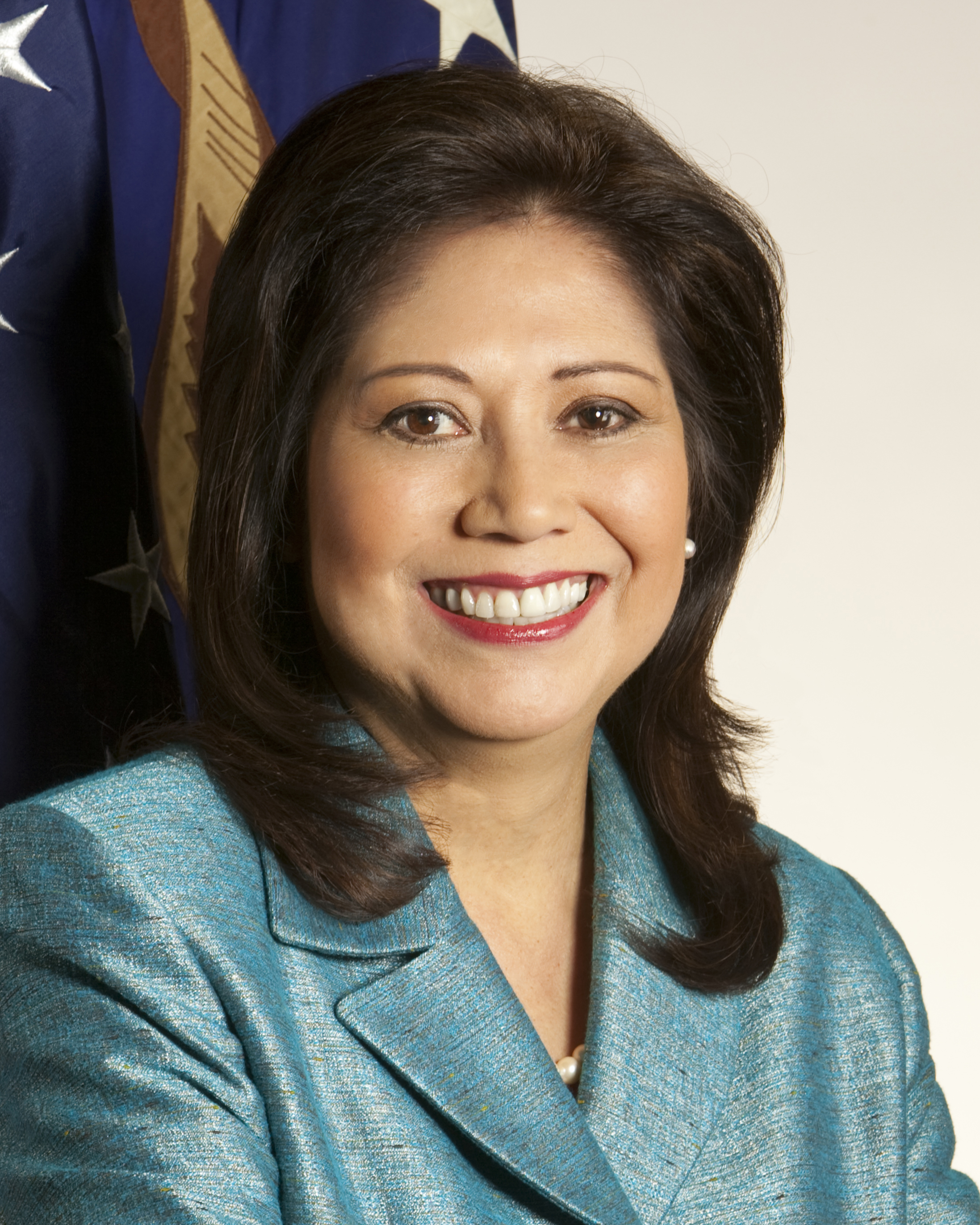
Hilda Solis
Secretary of Labor
(announced December 19, 2008)

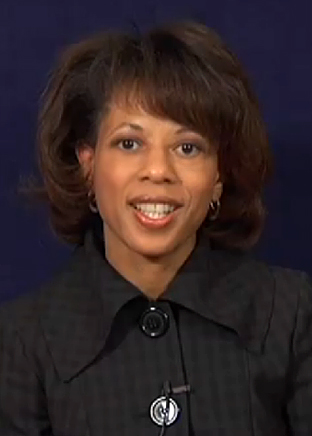
Melody Barnes
Director, Domestic Policy Council
(announced November 24, 2008)

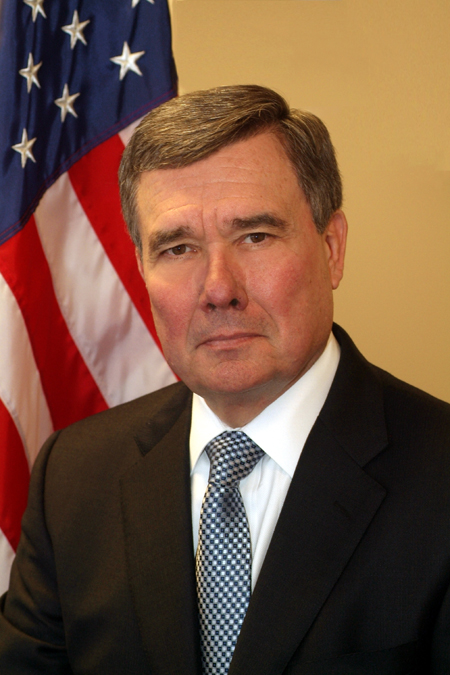
Gil Kerlikowske
Director, National Drug Control Policy
(announced February 10, 2009)

==== Economic policy ====
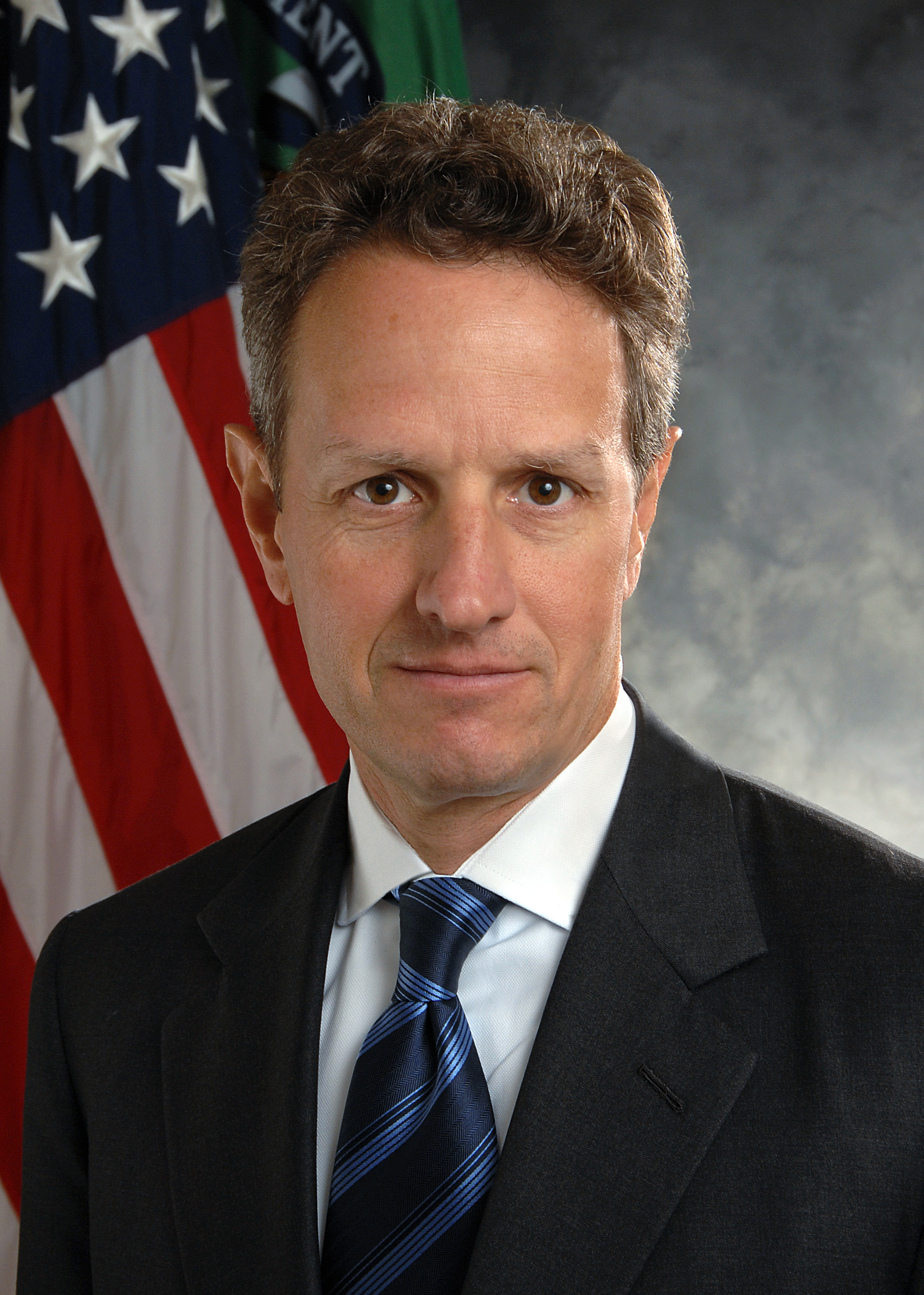
Timothy Geithner
Secretary of the Treasury
(announced November 24, 2008)

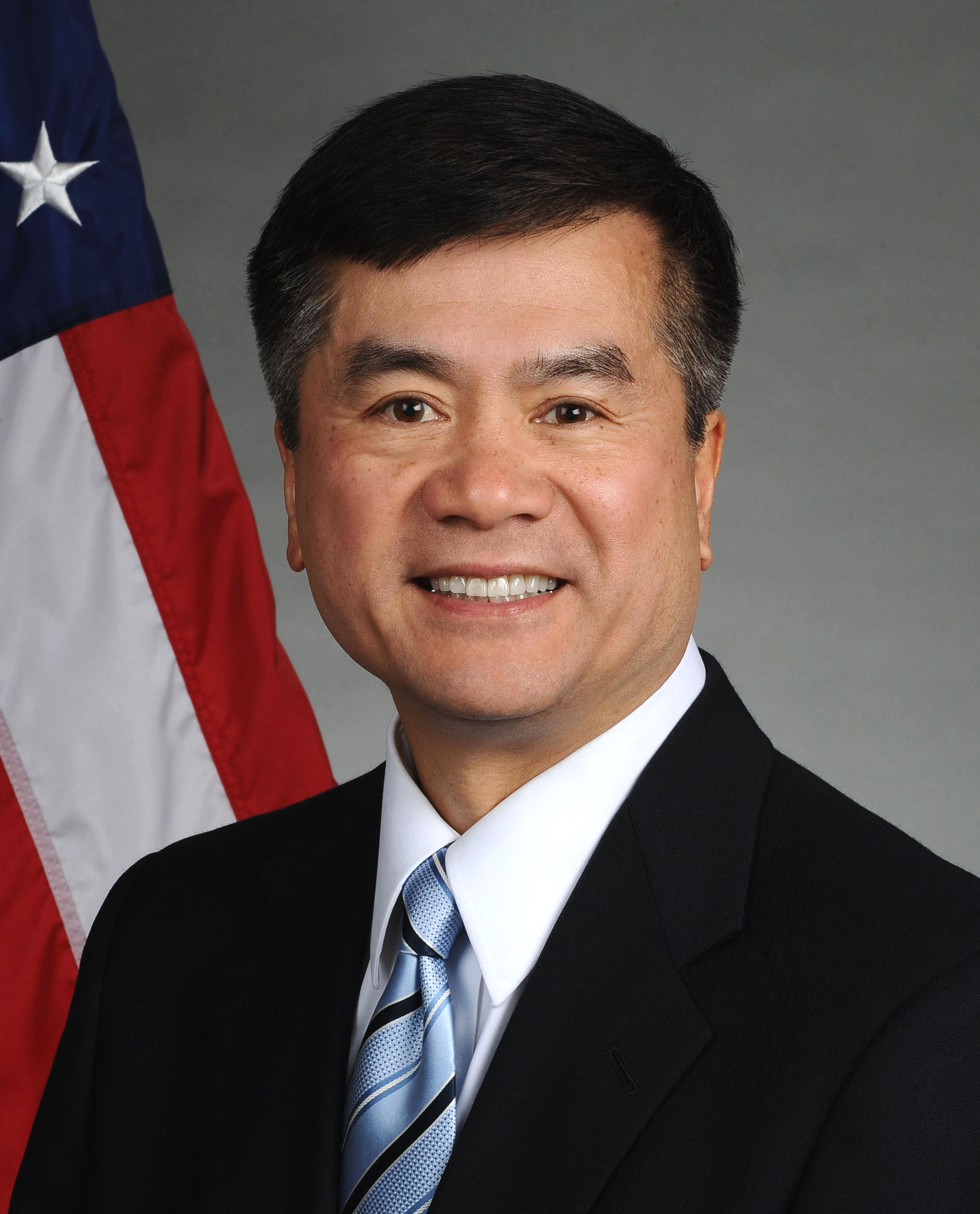
Gary Locke
Secretary of Commerce
(announced February 25, 2009)

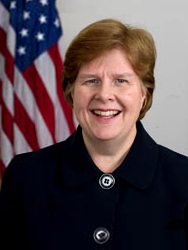
Christina Romer
Chairwoman, Council of Economic Advisers
(announced November 24, 2008)

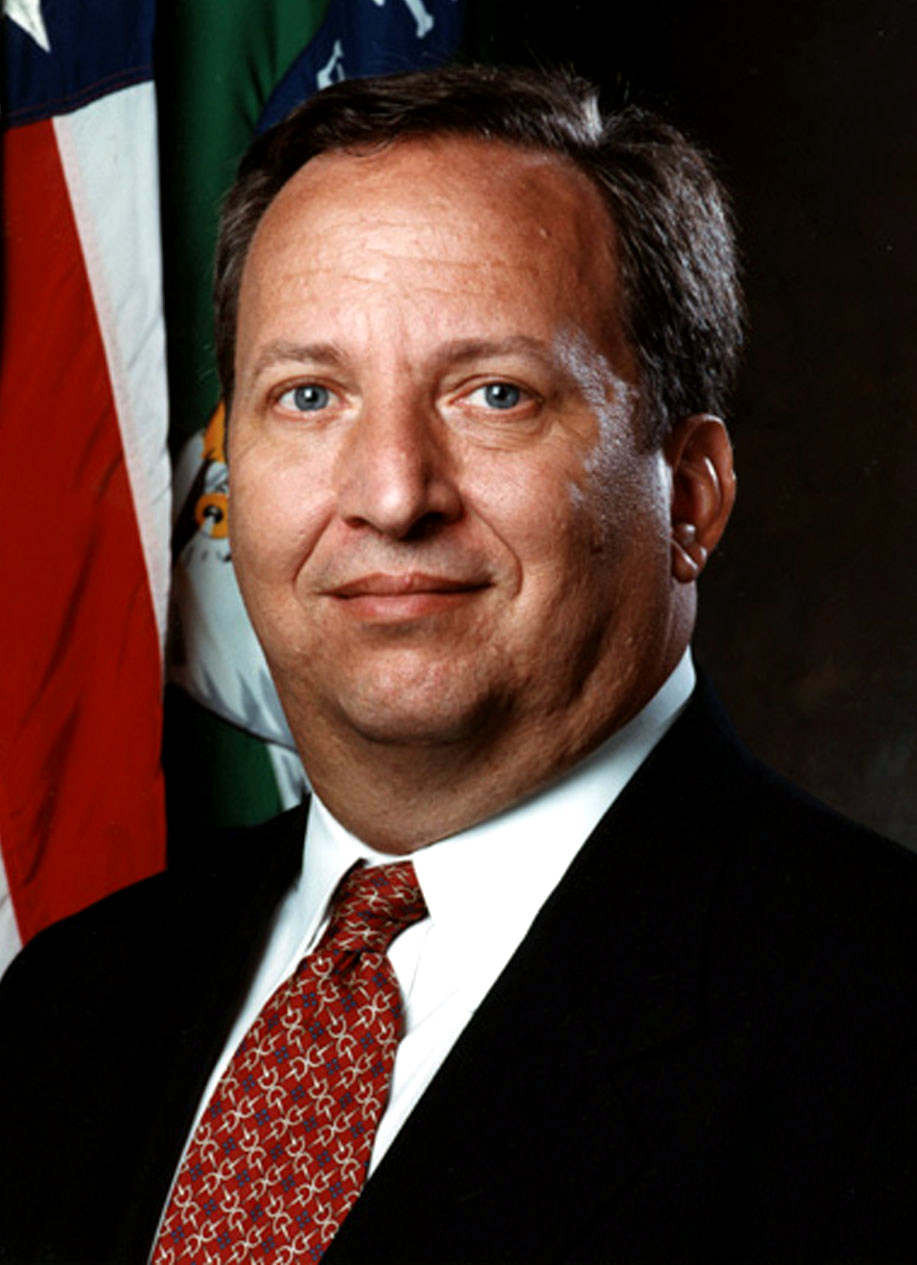
Lawrence Summers
Assistant to the President for Economic Policy
Director, National Economic Council
(announced November 24, 2008)

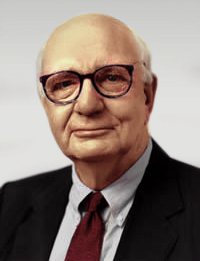
Paul Volcker
Chairman, Economic Recovery Advisory Board
(announced November 26, 2008)

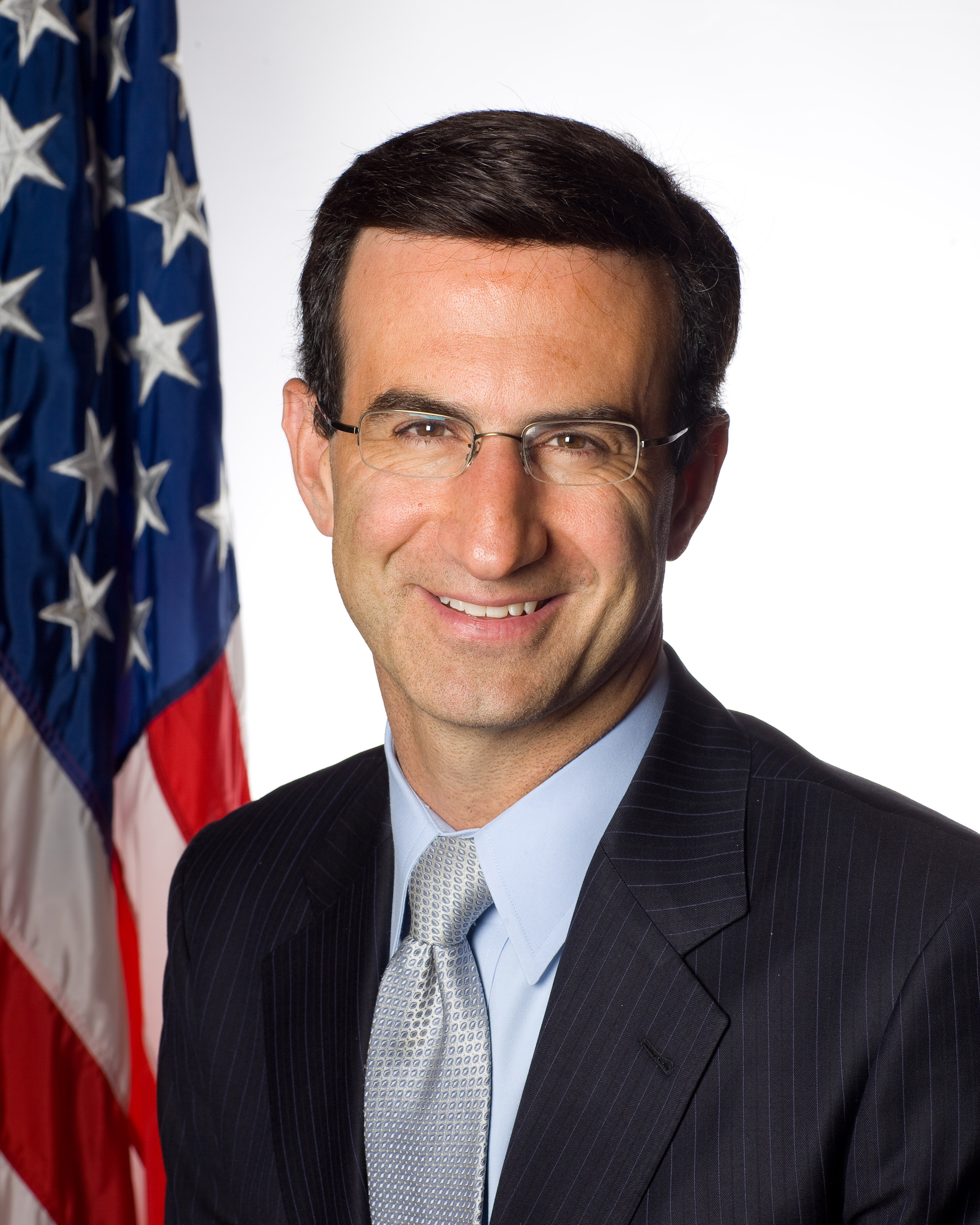
Peter R. Orszag
Director, Office of Management and Budget
(announced November 25, 2008)

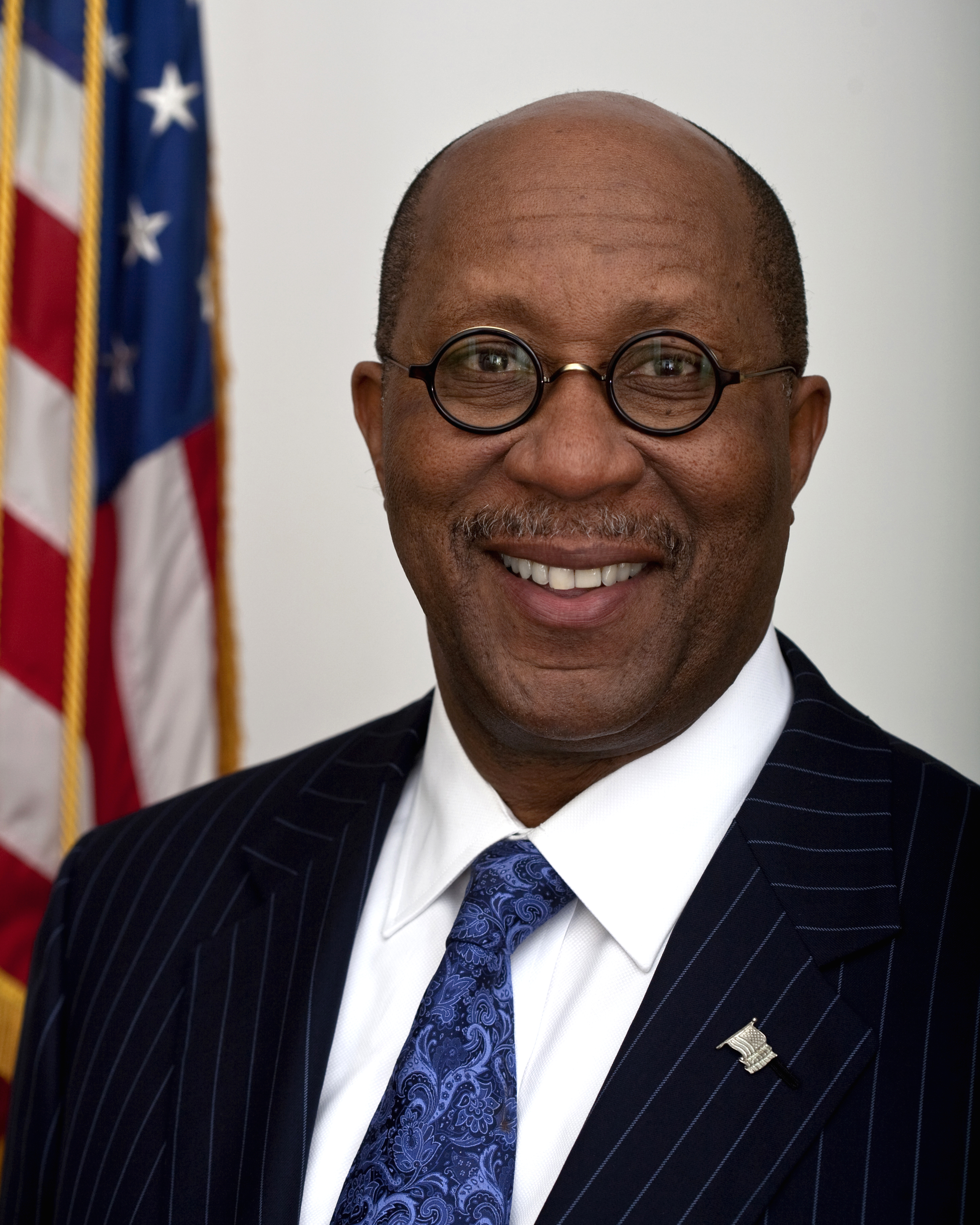
Ron Kirk
United States Trade Representative
(announced December 19, 2008)

==== Environment and energy ====
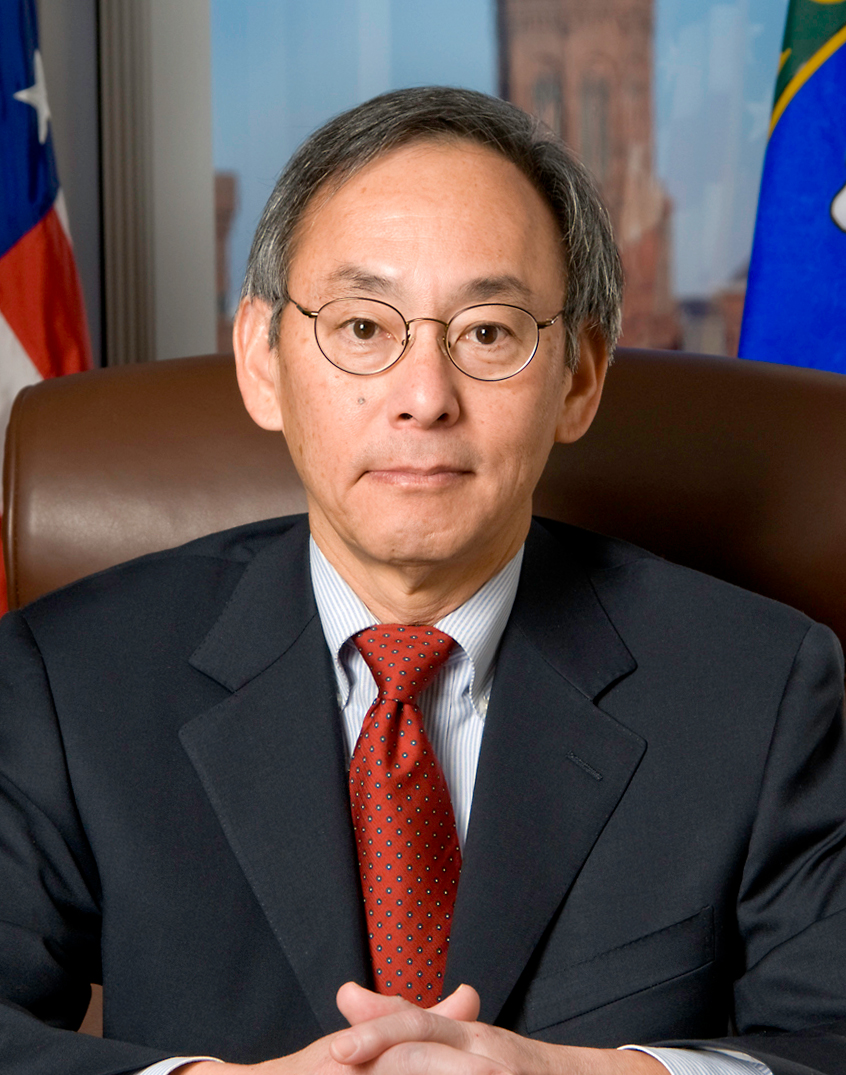
Steven Chu
Secretary of Energy
(announced December 15, 2008)

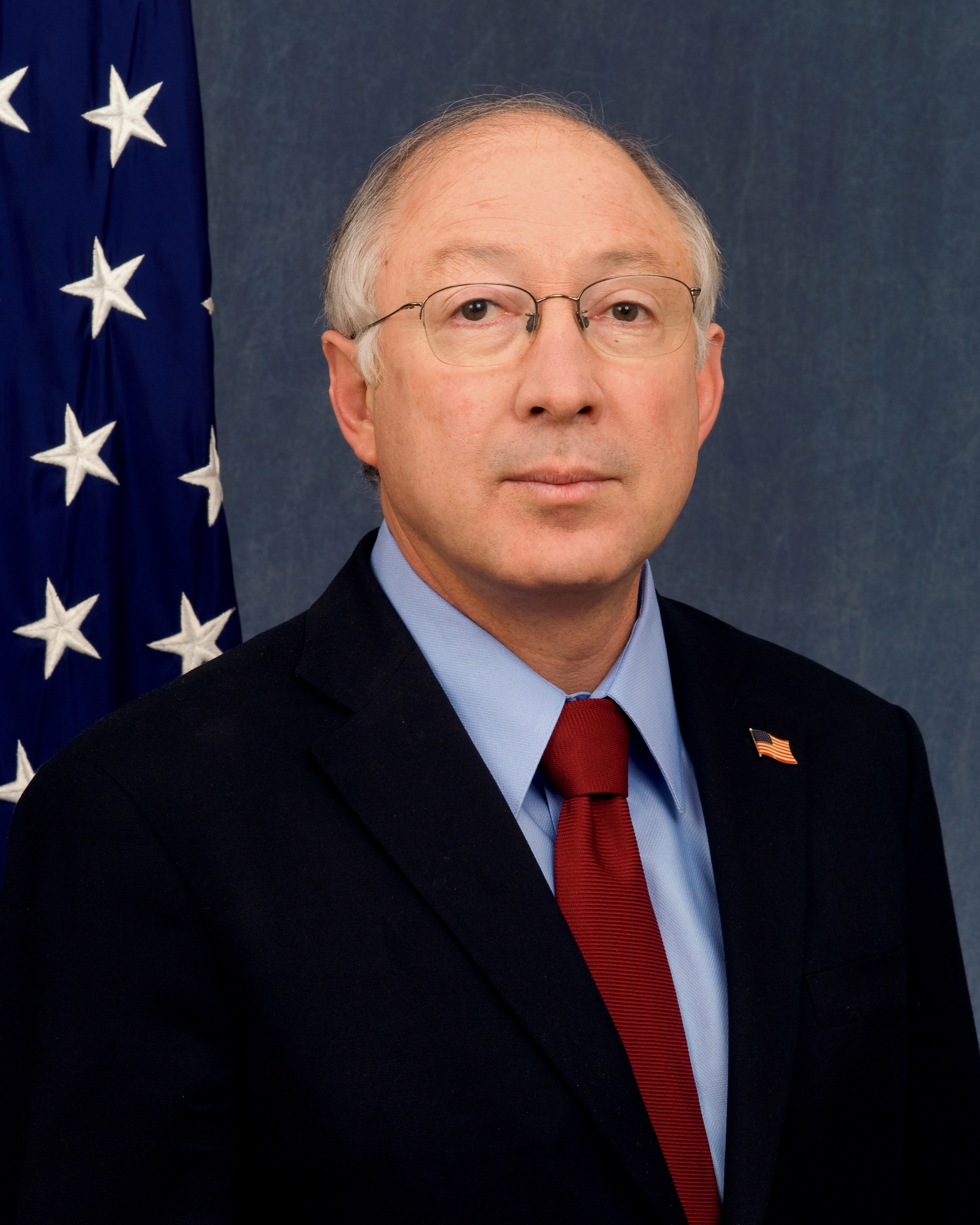
Ken Salazar
Secretary of the Interior
(announced December 17) (the nomination was given a Saxbe fix)

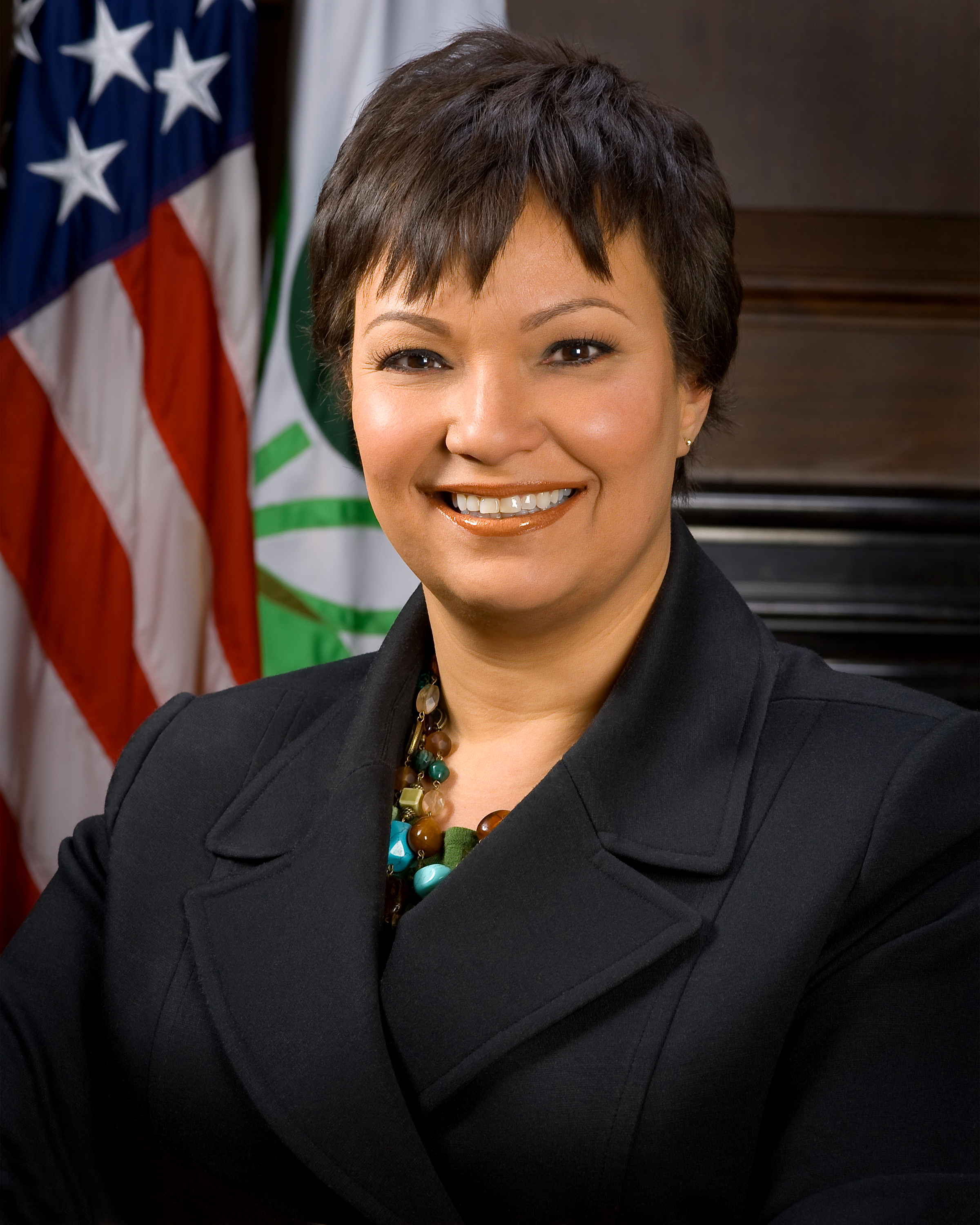
Lisa P. Jackson
Administrator of the EPA
(announced December 15, 2008)

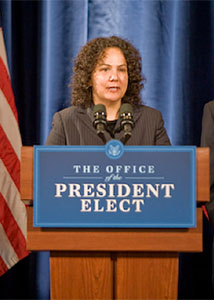
Nancy Sutley
Chair of the Council on Environmental Quality
(announced December 15, 2008)

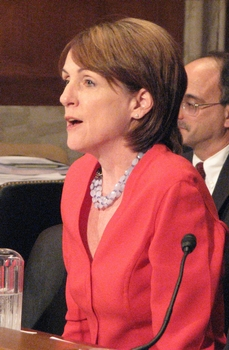
Carol Browner
Assistant to the President for Energy and Climate Change
(announced December 15, 2008)

==== Foreign affairs and national security ====
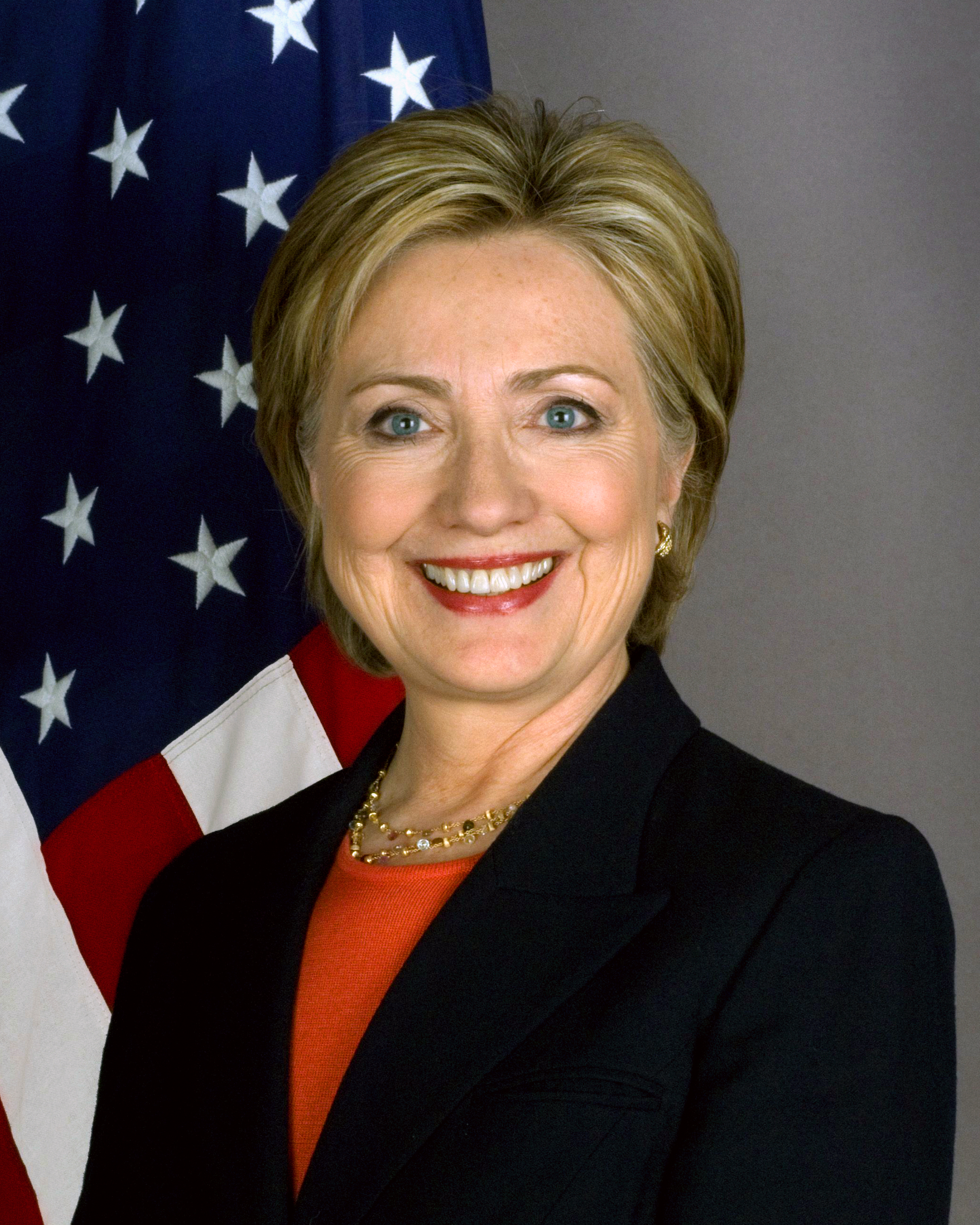
Hillary Clinton
Secretary of State
(announced December 1) (the nomination was given a Saxbe fix)

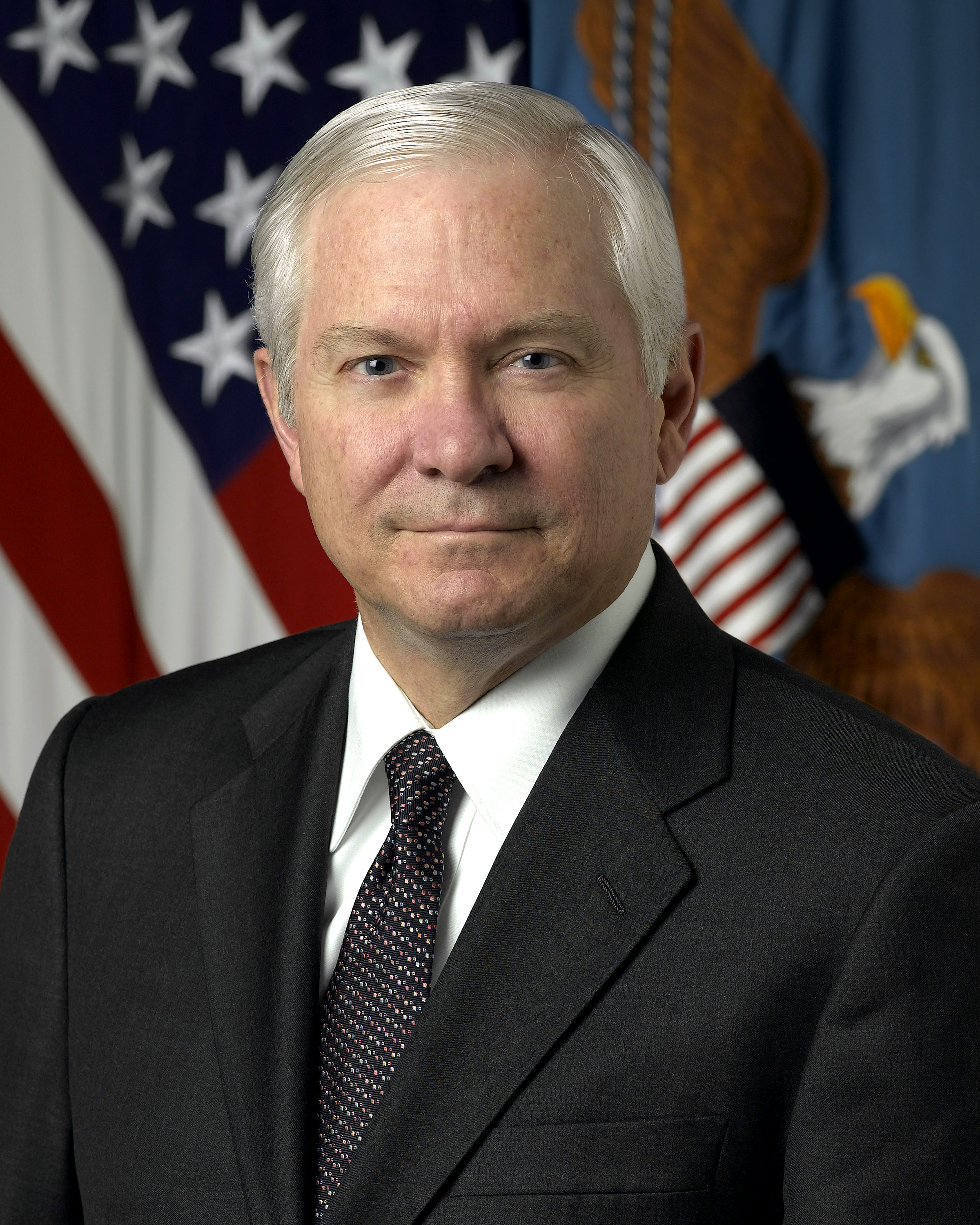
Robert Gates
Secretary of Defense
(continuation of previous administration's appointment, announced December 1)

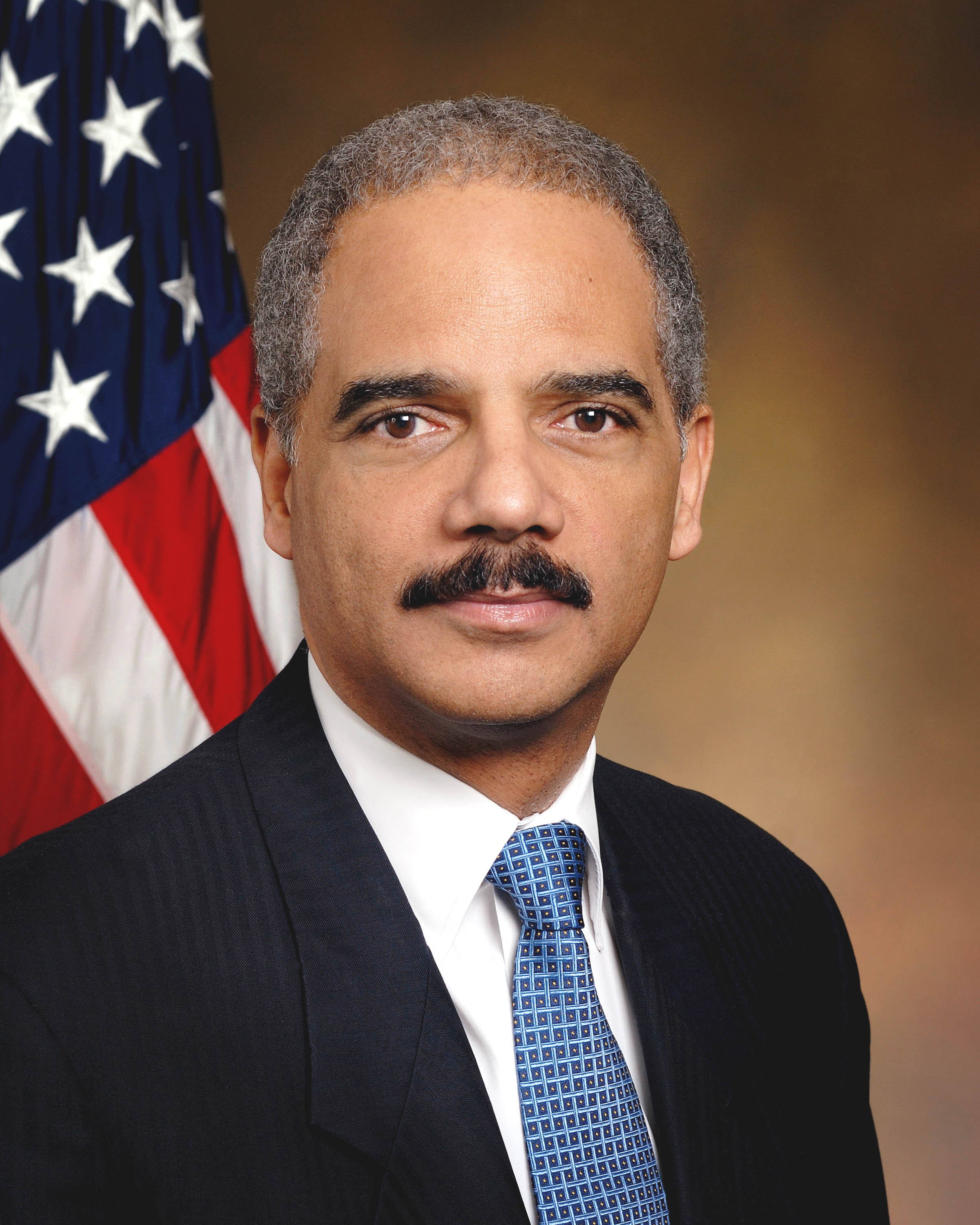
Eric Holder
Attorney General
(announced December 1, 2008)

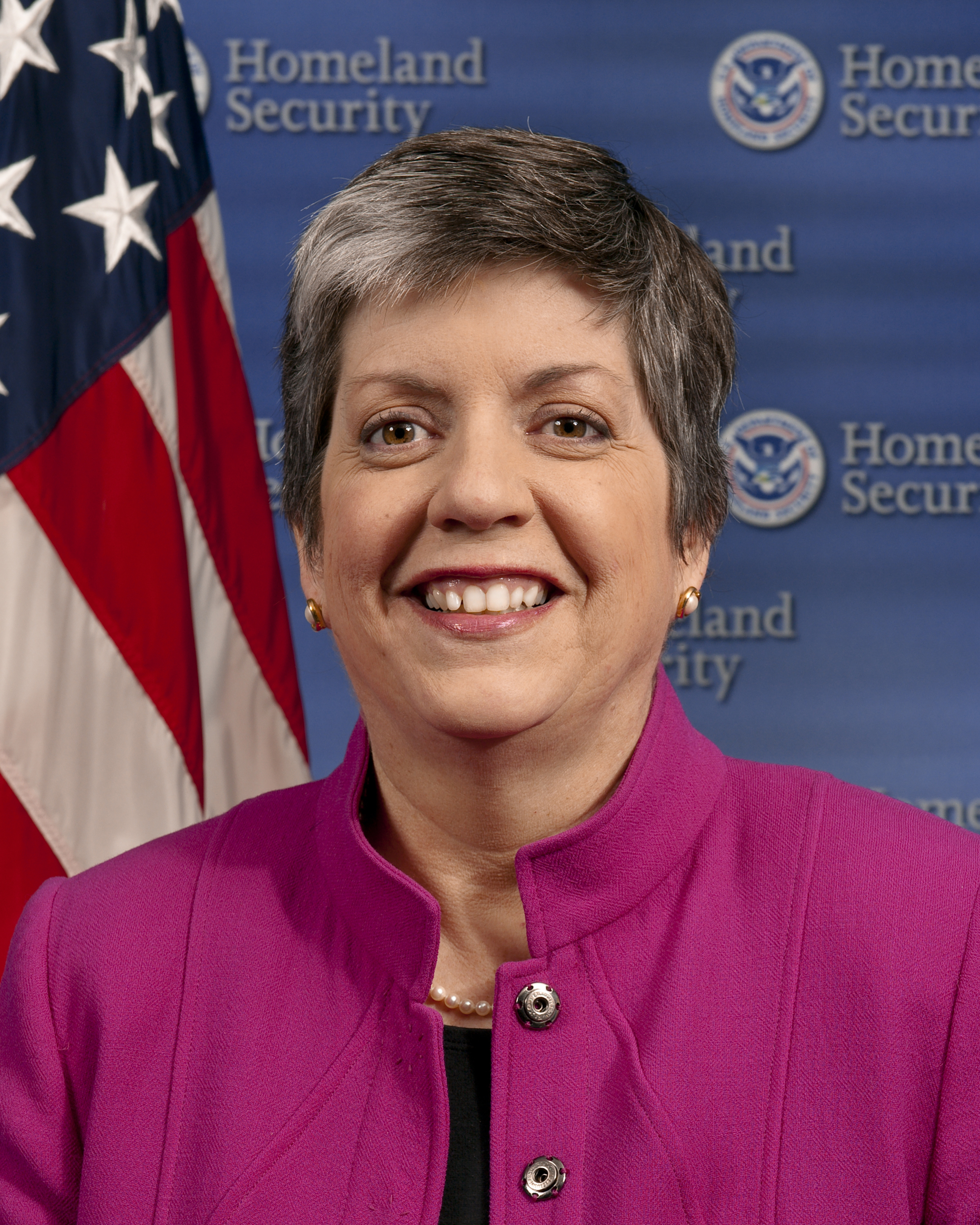
Janet Napolitano
Secretary of Homeland Security
(announced December 1)

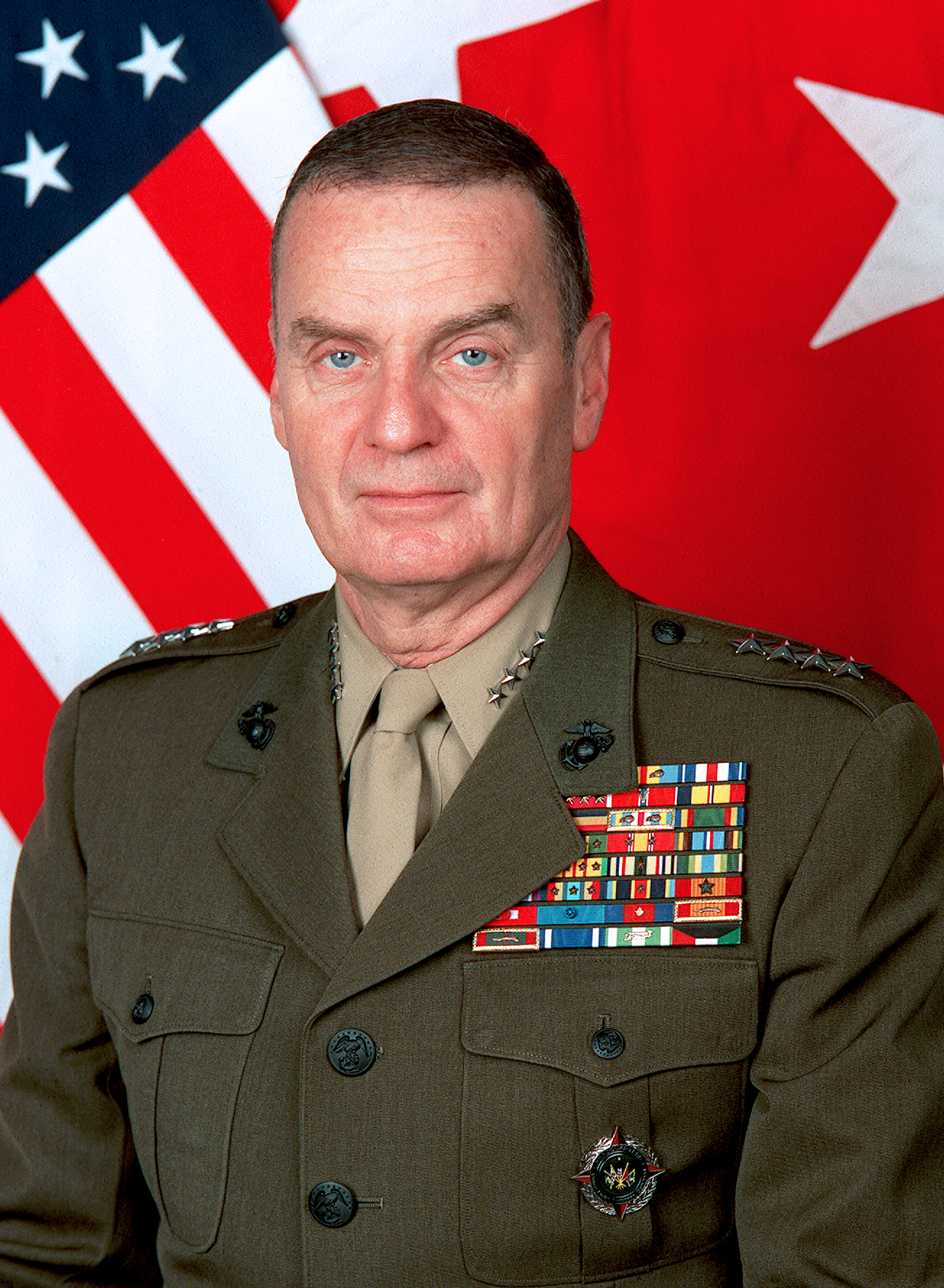
James L. Jones
Assistant to the President for National Security Affairs
(announced December 1)

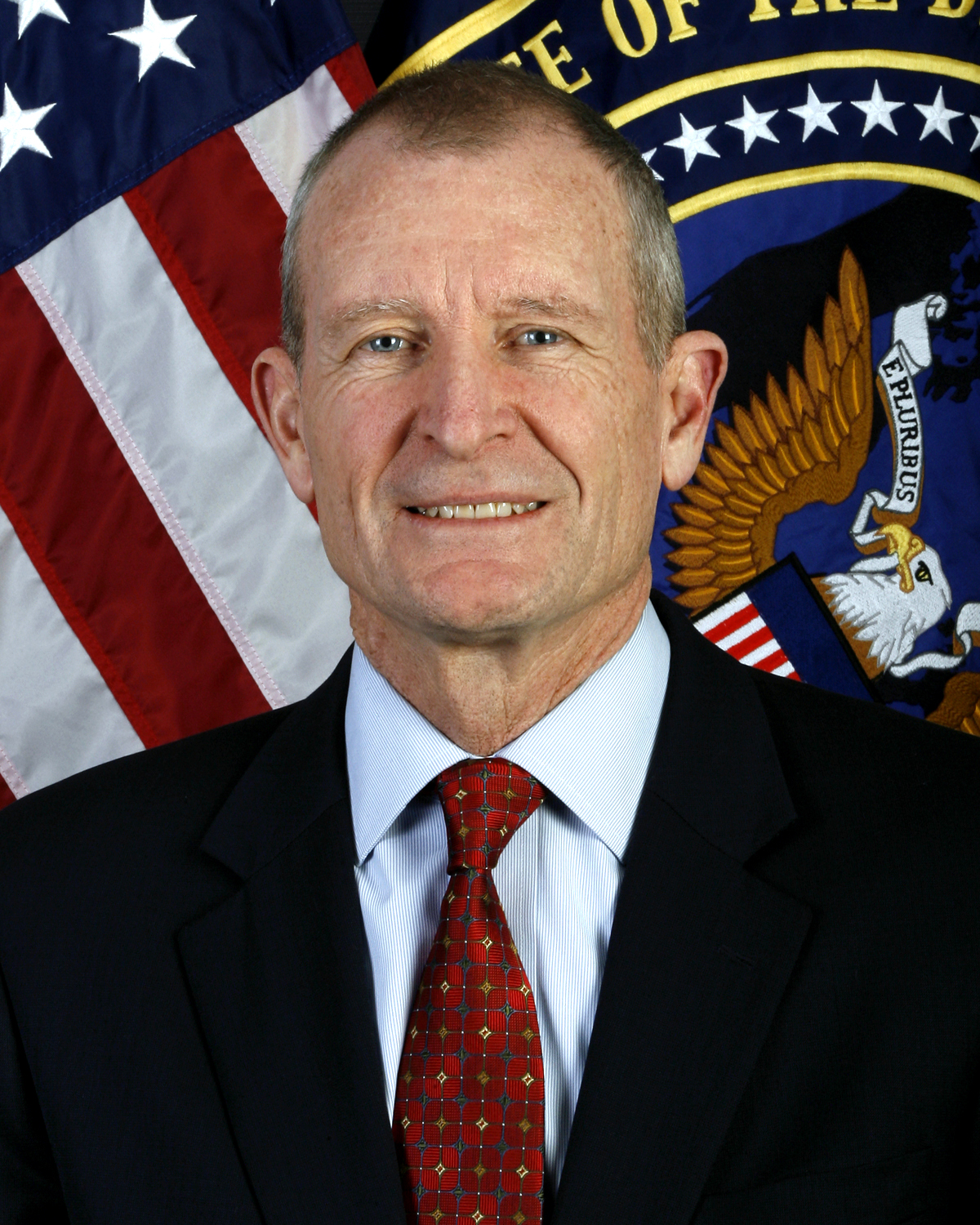
Dennis Blair
Director of National Intelligence
(announced January 2009)

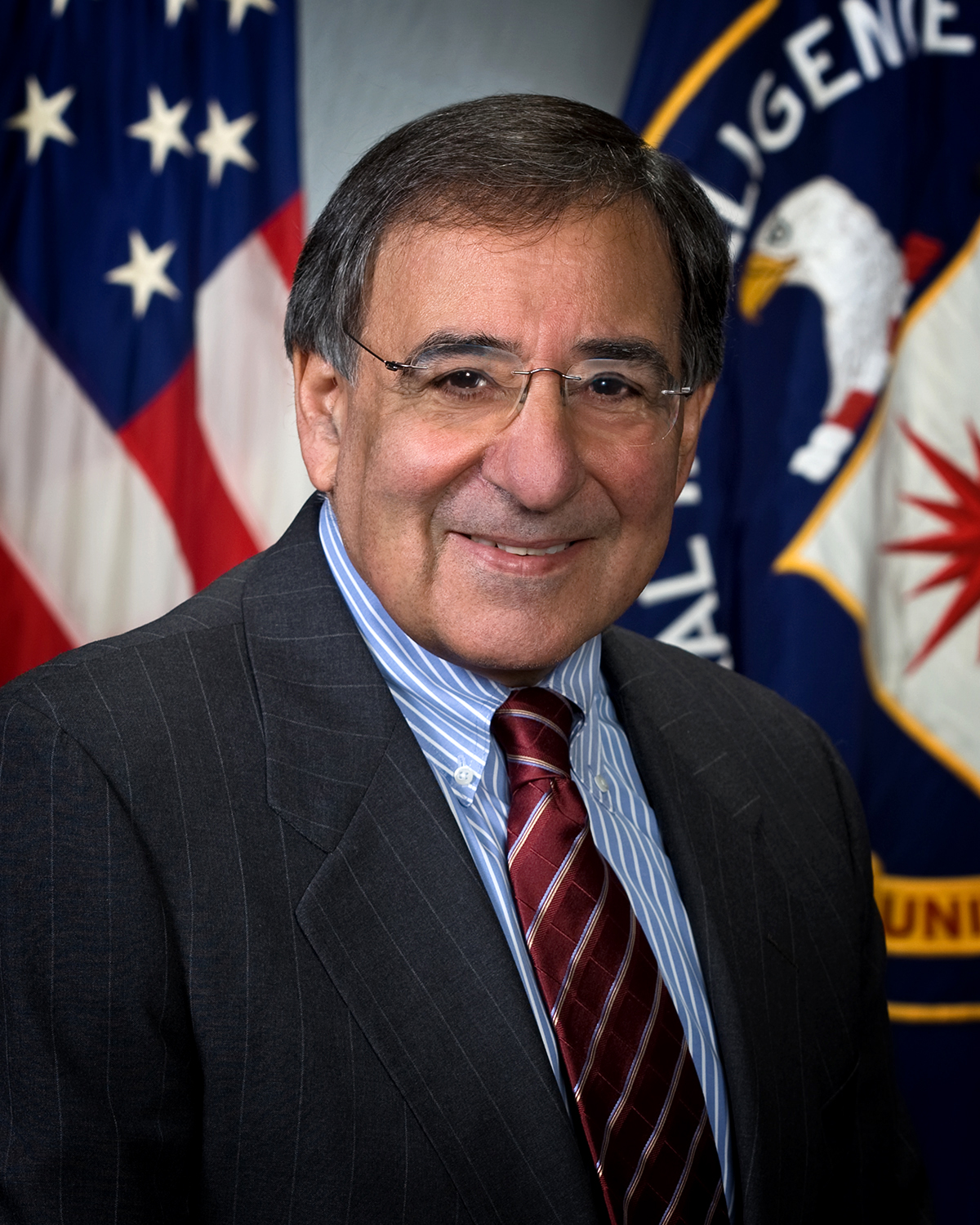
Leon Panetta
Director of the Central Intelligence Agency
(announced January 2009)

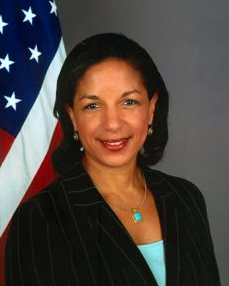
Susan Rice
U.S. Ambassador to the United Nations
(announced December 1)

=== Table ===
Proposed Obama administration personnel at the time of Inauguration January 20, 2009

Cabinet and cabinet-level

Position	Designate
White House Chief of Staff	Rahm Emanuel^{†}
Director of the Office of Management and Budget	Peter Orszag^{†}
Secretary of Defense	Robert Gates
Secretary of Commerce	Gary Locke
Secretary of Veterans Affairs	Eric Shinseki
Secretary of Housing and Urban Development	Shaun Donovan
Administrator of the Environmental Protection Agency	Lisa Jackson^{†}
Secretary of the Interior	Ken Salazar
Secretary of Transportation	Ray LaHood
Secretary of Labor	Hilda Solis

Position	Designate
Secretary of the Treasury	Timothy Geithner
Secretary of State	Hillary Clinton
Attorney General	Eric Holder
Secretary of Homeland Security	Janet Napolitano
Ambassador to the United Nations	Susan Rice^{†}
Secretary of Health and Human Services	Kathleen Sebelius
Secretary of Energy	Steven Chu
Secretary of Education	Arne Duncan
Secretary of Agriculture	Tom Vilsack
Trade Representative	Ronald Kirk^{†}

^{†}Cabinet-level position

Executive Office of the President

Position	Designee
Senior Advisor to the President; Assistant to the President for Intergovernmental Affairs; Public Liaison	Valerie Jarrett
Senior Advisor to the President	Pete Rouse
Deputy White House Chief of Staff	Jim Messina
Staff Secretary	Lisa Brown
Personal Secretary	Katie Johnson
Cabinet Secretary	Chris Lu
Chief of staff to the First Lady	Jackie Norris
White House Press Secretary	Robert Gibbs
White House Social Secretary; Special Assistant to the President	Desirée Rogers
Assistant to the President for Economic Policy (Director of the White House National Economic Council)	Lawrence; Summers
Assistant to the President for Domestic Policy (Director of the White House Domestic Policy Council)	Melody Barnes
Assistant to the President for Energy and Climate Change	Carol Browner
Deputy Director of the Office of Management and Budget	Rob Nabors
Chair of the President's Economic Recovery Advisory Board	Paul Volcker
Director of Speechwriting	Jon Favreau
Assistant to the President for National Security Affairs (National Security Adviser)	Jim Jones
Director of Public Liaison	Christina Tchen
Director of White House Office of Health Reform	Nancy-Ann Min DeParle
Deputy Assistant to the President for Energy and Climate Change	Heather Zichal
Co-chair of the President's Council of Advisers on Science and Technology	Eric Lander
Deputy White House Counsel with a Focus on Domestic Policy and Ethics	Cassandra Butts
Deputy Director of Legislative Affairs for the Senate	Shawn Maher
Special Assistant to the President; Director of Communications for the First Lady	Camille; Johnston
Deputy Press Secretary for the First Lady	Semonti; Mustaphi
White House Director of Presidential Personnel	Don Gips
Associate Counsel to the President	Susan Sher

Position	Designee
Assistant to the President for Legislative Affairs	Phil Schiliro
Deputy White House Chief of Staff	Mona Sutphen
Senior Advisor to the President	David Axelrod
White House Counsel	Greg Craig
Director of the White House Office of Political Affairs	Patrick Gaspard
Assistant to the President for Communications (White House Director of Communications)	Ellen Moran
Deputy Assistant to the President for Communications (Deputy White House Director of Communications)	Dan Pfeiffer
Deputy Chief of Staff to the First Lady	Melissa Winter
Director of the White House Council of Economic Advisers	Christina Romer
Deputy Assistant to the President for Domestic Policy (deputy director of the White House Domestic Policy Council)	Heather; Higginbottom
White House Director of Scheduling and Advance	Alyssa; Mastromonaco
Staff Director and Chief Economist of the President's Economic Recovery Advisory Board; Member of the White House Council of Economic Advisers	Austan; Goolsbee
Director of Intergovernmental Affairs	Cecilia Muñoz
Director of the White House Military Office	Louis Caldera
Chief of staff to the Assistant to the President for Intergovernmental Relations; Public Liaison	Michael; Strautmanis
Deputy Director of White House Office of Health Reform	Jeanne Lambrew
Chair of the White House Council on Environmental Quality	Nancy Sutley
Assistant to the President for Science and Technology (Director of the White House Office of Science and Technology Policy); Co-chair of the President's Council of Advisers on Science and Technology	John Holdren
Co-chair of the President's Council of Advisers on Science and Technology	Harold Varmus
Deputy Cabinet Secretary	Liz Sears Smith
Deputy Director of Legislative Affairs for the House of Representatives	Dan Turton
Press Secretary for the First Lady	Katie; McCormick; Lelyveld
Director of the Office of Management and Administration	Bradley Kiley
Chief Performance Officer deputy director for Management at the Office of Management and Budget	Jeffrey Zients
Director of White House Office of Urban Policy	Adolfo Carrion*

Other

Position	Designee
Chair of the Securities and Exchange Commission	Mary Schapiro
Member of the Board of Governors of the Federal Reserve System	Daniel Tarullo
Under Secretary of Commerce for Oceans and Atmosphere (Administrator of the National Oceanic and Atmospheric Administration)	Jane; Lubchenco
Solicitor General	Elena Kagan
Assistant Attorney General for the Office of Legal Counsel	Dawn Johnsen
Director of National Intelligence	Dennis Blair
Director of the Central Intelligence Agency	Leon Panetta

Position	Designee
Chair of the Commodity Futures Trading Commission	Gary Gensler
Administrator of the Small Business Administration	Karen Mills
Deputy Attorney General	David Ogden
Associate Attorney General	Tom Perrelli
Surgeon General	Regina Benjamin
Deputy Secretary of State	James Steinberg; Jacob Lew
Special Assistant to the President	Eugene Kang

* Although identified by sources to the press, selection awaited official announcement by the office of the President Elect.

Office of the Vice President

Position	Designate
Chief of Staff to the Vice President	Ron Klain
Counsel to the Vice President	Cynthia Hogan
Counselor to the Vice President	Mike Donilon
Assistant to the Vice President for Intergovernmental Affairs; Public Liaison	Evan Ryan
Assistant to the Vice President; Director of Communications	Jay Carney
Deputy Chief of Staff to the Vice President	Alan Hoffman
Deputy National Security Adviser to the Vice President	Brian McKeon
Director of Communications for the Second Lady	Courtney O'Donnell

Position	Designate
Chief of Staff to the Second Lady	Catherine Russell
Director of Administration for the Office of the Vice President	Moe Vela
Domestic Policy Adviser to the Vice President	Terrell McSweeny
Chief Economist and Economic Policy Adviser to the Vice President	Jared Bernstein
Press Secretary to the Vice President	Elizabeth Alexander
Deputy Press Secretary to the Vice President	Annie Tomasini
Director of Legislative Affairs	Sudafi Henry
Residence Manager and Social Secretary for the Vice President and the Second Lady	Carlos Elizondo

== Emerging agenda ==
Obama's developing presidential agenda was divided into domestic and foreign policy issues. In most cases, this agenda involved addressing crises already underway. His principal strategic decisions concerned how quickly to move bills through Congress. Some of his advisors suggested moving quickly, as Franklin D. Roosevelt did in 1933, under the belief that a more moderate approach would waste valuable time early in his presidency, when his political capital will be strongest. Others suggested moving more slowly, as Bill Clinton did before his attempt to enact a national healthcare program, based on the notion that rapid change could quickly wear down any bipartisan consensus. He was expected, in any case, to issue a series of executive orders within days of his inauguration, including a reversal of Bush-era executive orders restricting funding to family planning (including abortion) services and stem-cell research. There was also a possibility that a new cabinet level advisory post would be created overseeing the Department of Energy, Department of the Interior and the Environmental Protection Agency.

According to Podesta, the transition team planned to conduct an exhaustive review of Bush's executive orders in an effort to find quick changes that could be implemented on the first day in office. Podesta also says that there is a great deal that can be accomplished without waiting for Congress to act and that Obama wanted to move quickly once in office to restore "a sense that the country is working on behalf of the common good."

=== Economic agenda ===
The economic agenda under development initially focused on short-term measures intended to hold off widespread economic losses so that a longer-term economic agenda could then be formulated. That approach subsequently shifted to a longer-term stimulus plan, with a goal of creating 2.5 million jobs over a two-year period. With a cost of $700 to $800 billion, the stimulus plan would cost more than a quarter million dollars per job created (divide 750 billion by 2,500,000 yielding $300,000). In a nationally televised interview on December 7, he acknowledged that his agenda has changed over the past month, and that a short-term stimulus package had again become his first priority. He wanted to emphasize "shovel ready" infrastructure projects to create new jobs quickly. Barack Obama said he hoped to sign the stimulus package into law soon after taking office on January 20.

Obama's most immediate concern was an economic stimulus proposal that some Congressional Democrats had advocated. Like previous stimulus packages, that proposal was demand-side (Keynesian) in nature. It would likely consist of increased funding for unemployment benefits, the Food Stamp Program, and infrastructure projects, rather than tax rebates. In fact, Obama claimed to be planning "the largest infrastructure program in roads and bridges and other traditional infrastructure since the building of the Interstate Highway System in the 1950s." However, he also emphasized his plans to "green" the federal government by updating heating and lighting systems in federal buildings, as well as significant investment in technology initiatives such as mandatory electronic medical records, improved computers in schools, and universal availability of broadband Internet access.

Additional funding for Medicaid was also being considered. A similar stimulus bill was passed by the House of Representatives on September 26, 2008, but never approved by the Senate. Obama promised to promote a stimulus bill early in his presidency if one was not passed before his inauguration on January 20, 2009. In addition, Obama considered the request of the U.S. automotive industry for a cash infusion of $50 billion in addition to the $25 billion that had already been approved, but emphasizing that his support is "conditioned on them making significant adjustments."

Obama also planned to push for a program to spend $150 billion over 10 years to develop new renewable energy sources. This money would also be used to encourage energy conservation and help the auto industry develop fuel-efficient vehicles. However, Mother Jones reported that the Windfall Profits Tax on oil companies, which he frequently cited during the campaign, had been dropped from the agenda early in the transition.

According to the transition's website, Obama also hoped to rekindle volunteerism by expanding AmeriCorps and the Peace Corps and also creating a new Classroom Corps. Other volunteer efforts reportedly include a Health Corps, Clean Energy Corps, and Veterans Corps. Middle and high school students would be asked to do 50 hours of community service work a year. College students would be eligible for $4,000 in tuition tax credits in exchange for community service work. Improved volunteerism programs aimed at senior citizens were projected, as well as augmented Youth Build and Head Start programs.

=== Agenda on healthcare ===
On December 5, Tom Daschle, who was designated to lead Obama's efforts for health care reform, announced a month-long campaign to solicit public input on the shape of that reform. People were encouraged to hold community meetings to discuss the issue, and to post their thoughts on www.change.gov, where over 10,000 comments had already been posted. Although Democratic leaders had met in private for several months to prepare a legislative package for unveiling in January, Daschle was anxious to avoid the appearance that the transition was working behind closed doors to create a sweeping agenda for change.

This technique, developed by grass roots organizations like MoveOn.org, was designed to reinforce the notion that Obama intended to aggressively pursue his health care reform agenda despite the worsening economy. "President-elect Obama has made health reform one of his top priorities, and I'm here to tell you that his commitment to changing the healthcare system remains strong and focused", said Daschle.

During a news conference on December 11, 2008, Obama linked health care reform to the upcoming economic stimulus package, noting that "It's not something that we can sort of put off because we're in an emergency." "This is part of the emergency." He expected the stimulus legislation to include a $40 billion increase in Medicaid spending over two years, plus a massive investment in health information management technology. Consideration was also being given to funding for retraining medical workers, expansion of the State Children's Health Insurance Program (SCHIP), and expansion of the COBRA provisions, which allow unemployed workers to purchase health insurance through their previous employer's plan.

=== Foreign policy agenda ===
One of the principal foreign policy issues that Obama ran on during the presidential campaign was his promise to withdraw most American troops from the Iraq War within sixteen months of his inauguration. Another issue concerned the three areas that President Bush had been focusing on during the final months of his term: Iran's nuclear development, North Korea's nuclear arsenal, and the Israeli-Palestinian peace talks. In all three cases, a diplomatic structure had already been established, although some of the Bush administration's goals differ from those Obama that would adopt as president.

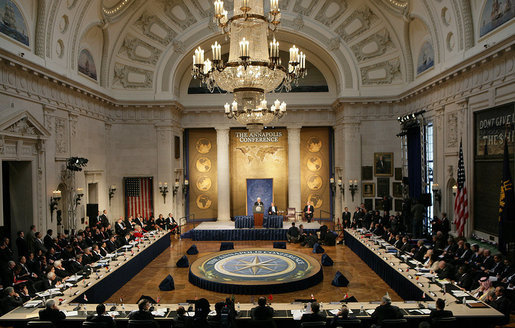
The Annapolis Conference gathers in November 2007.

In the Middle East, Bush began a new approach to the peace process, the so-called Annapolis process, which attempted to encourage Israeli and Palestinian leaders to agree on the outlines of a peace accord. Although both sides cited some success in these discussions, critics believed the talks unduly ignored Hamas, which has been labeled by the United States as a terrorist organization, despite the fact that it had held an enormous amount of political power in the region. Obama had not specified what his approach would be, although it was considered likely that he would appoint a high-level Middle East envoy, in part to free his Secretary of State so that other matters can also be addressed. Hamas expressed a willingness to talk to Obama, who has said that he would reciprocate only if it renounced terrorism, recognized Israel's right to exist, and agreed to abide by past agreements. The Hamas leader in Gaza, Ismail Haniyeh, said the Hamas government would accept a Palestinian state that followed the Green Line and would offer Israel a long-term truce if Israel recognised the Palestinians' national rights.

During his second term, Bush pursued an agreement with North Korea to end its nuclear weapons programs. To that end, Bush agreed to remove North Korea from the State Department's list of State Sponsors of Terrorism, which Obama supported. Obama had criticized Bush for taking so long to engage with North Korea, and indicated he would be eager to engage in a more proactive manner in order to reach an agreement. A senior North Korean official recently told reporters that "we are ready to deal" with the incoming Obama administration.

Obama also deliberated on how to deal with Iran. Outgoing Secretary of State Condoleezza Rice had assembled a coalition of six states—all five members of the United Nations Security Council plus Germany—to confront Iran. While the group won approval from the United Nations, Iran largely ignored its demands. While Obama had previously advocated carefully planned direct talks with Iran, he was now being seen as likely to build on the current coalition to broker an agreement with Iran.

In addition, Obama formulated a policy to deal with the U.S. missile defense shield that was under construction in Poland. He discussed the matter with both Polish President Lech Kaczyński and Russian President Dmitry Medvedev. While his advisors were working on a missile shield policy, his position at that time was simply that one might be deployed if and when it has been "proved to be workable".

Obama also planned to revoke a series of executive orders enacted by Bush that authorized enhanced interrogation techniques which many critics have labeled as torture against "detainees." The revocations would have the effect of requiring the CIA to abide by the Army Field Manual when it interrogated prisoners. Resistance was expected, however, from some in the Intelligence Community, regarding the practicality of a complete revocation of these orders. Obama also hoped to close the detention camp at Guantanamo Bay Naval Base in Cuba, although issues were expected to arise because many of the detainees had been held without evidence or had been coerced in their confessions, which would not be admissible in a federal court.

A November 20, 2008, Los Angeles Times article stated, "Antiwar groups and other liberal activists are increasingly concerned at signs that Barack Obama's national security team will be dominated by appointees who favored the Iraq invasion... 'It's astonishing that not one of the 23 senators or 133 House members who voted against the war is in the mix,' said Sam Husseini of the liberal group Institute for Public Accuracy."

=== National defense ===
Secretary of Defense Robert Gates, who was retained in the Obama Administration, outlined an agenda for reform of the Department of Defense. His ideas centered on a perceived need to shift purchasing priorities away from costly high tech weapons, and toward lower cost alternatives that are more appropriate for the wars the U.S. was currently fighting, as well as those he believed might lie in the immediate future. He noted that there are limits to U.S. military power, and believed that the emphasis should be shifted away from fighting, and toward training, advising and equipping allied forces to fight.

Specific areas Gates and Obama agreed on were said to include:

- Improved coordination and cooperation between the military and the State Department, as well as other civilian agencies.
- Improving the "security capacity" of US allies to allow them to increase their participation in the war on terrorism.
- Being attentive to the risk from conventional military forces, as well as insurgencies.
- Shifting troops and other resources from Iraq to Afghanistan.
- Continued expansion of the Army and Marine Corps.
- Overhaul of the Pentagon's procurement system.

=== Energy policy ===
Obama made energy policy one of his topmost priorities in his 2008 campaign. Towards his energy goals of United States energy independence through investment in alternative energy production he has set the following objectives:

- Within ten years save more oil than current imports from the Middle East and Venezuela combined.
- By 2015 put one million plug-in hybrid vehicles on the road.
- By 2012, 10% of U.S. electricity shall come from renewable sources and 25% by 2025.
- By 2050, 80% of currently emitted greenhouse gases shall be eliminated.

To achieve these objectives, Obama proposed the following measures

- Over 10 years invest $150 billion for energy development with a lower CO_{2} emissions including:
  - Transition to a digital electricity grid. Create a Grid Modernization Commission to facilitate adoption of smart grid practices.
  - Accelerate commercialization of plug-in hybrid technology.
  - Create 5 million green collar jobs involved in projects such as in construction, retrofitting buildings to make them more energy efficient or to generate their own power.
- Develop and deploy clean coal technology.
- Establish a national low-carbon fuel standard.
- Weatherize one million homes annually.
- Increase "CAFE" fuel efficiency standards for vehicles.
- Set construction of the Alaska natural gas pipeline as a high priority.
- Establish a "use it or lose it" approach to existing oil and gas leases granted for federal land.
- Establish an economy-wide cap and trade program.

Appointees recruited by Obama with experience on energy policy included Peter Orszag, an expert on cap and trade programs, who was named as director of the Office of Management and Budget. John Podesta, transition chief, was an early advocate of Detroit's refocus on using lower carbon alternatives to gasoline.

== Secret Service preparations ==
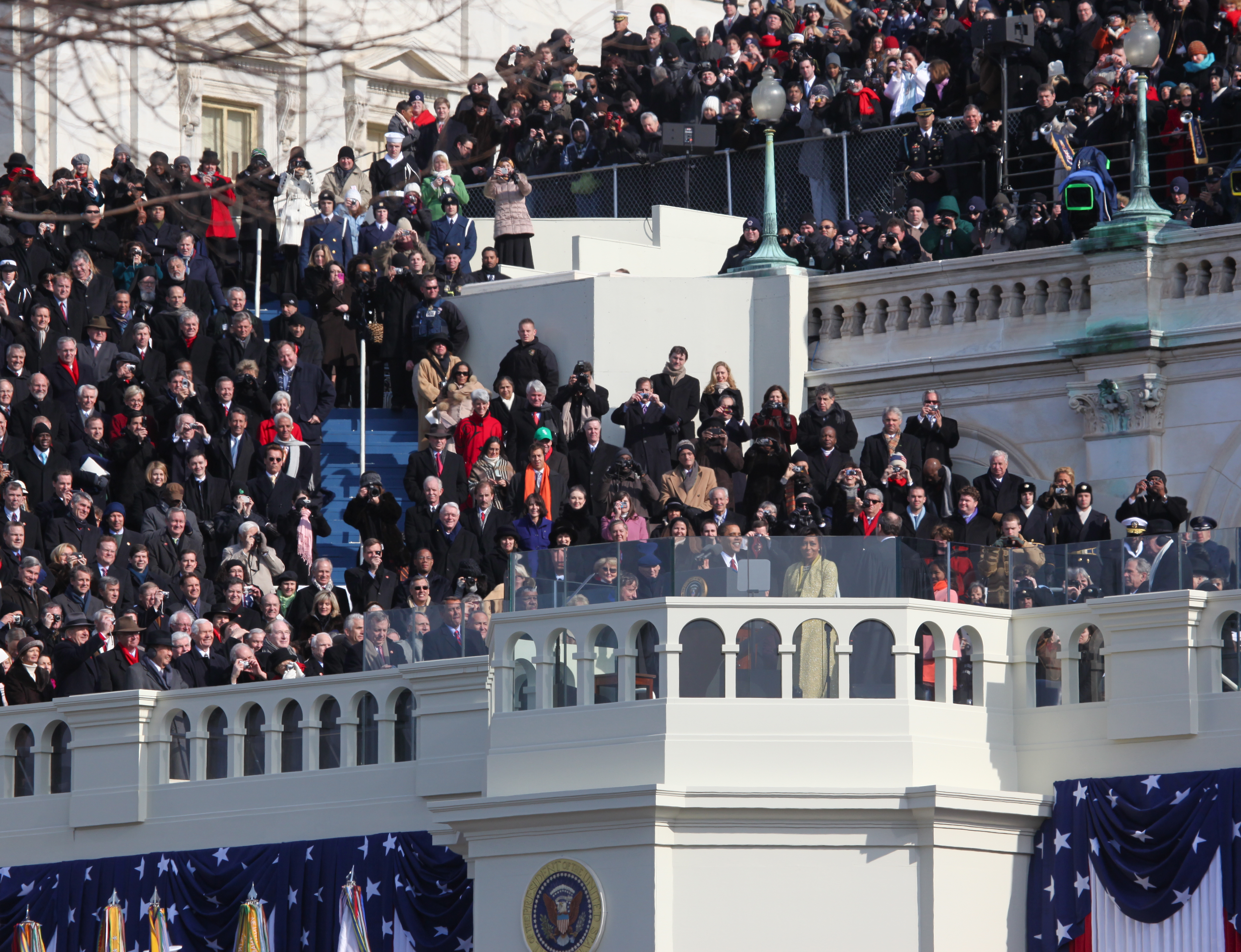
Barack Obama being sworn in as the 44th president of the United States

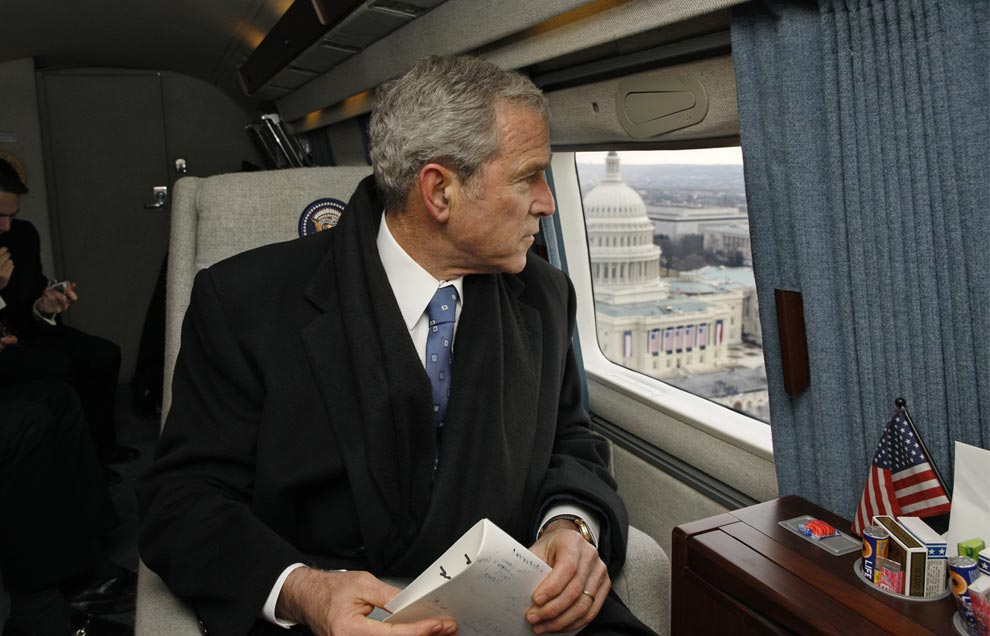
George W. Bush departing in a Marine Corps helicopter as he looks at U.S. Capitol after the Inauguration of Barack Obama

The Secret Service, of the U.S. Department of Homeland Security, was the lead agency for both security and logistics for the Inaugural Ceremony. Their plan was to open the event to as many spectators as possible. Security was expected to be strict, and vast portions of downtown Washington would be closed to all traffic. Initially, it was thought that up to 4 million people would descend upon the area of the National Mall, but later reports from the Secret Service suggested that the number might not be that high. Arrangements for 8,000 police officers were made, however, and parking for up to 10,000 tour buses was arranged. A Metro spokesperson warned that the subway system "will be utterly overwhelmed." Camping was not permitted on the mall.

On November 13, 2008, the Secret Service announced that Obama's codename would be "Renegade". In addition, his wife's is "Renaissance" and his daughters' are "Rosebud" and "Radiance".

=== Residential transition ===
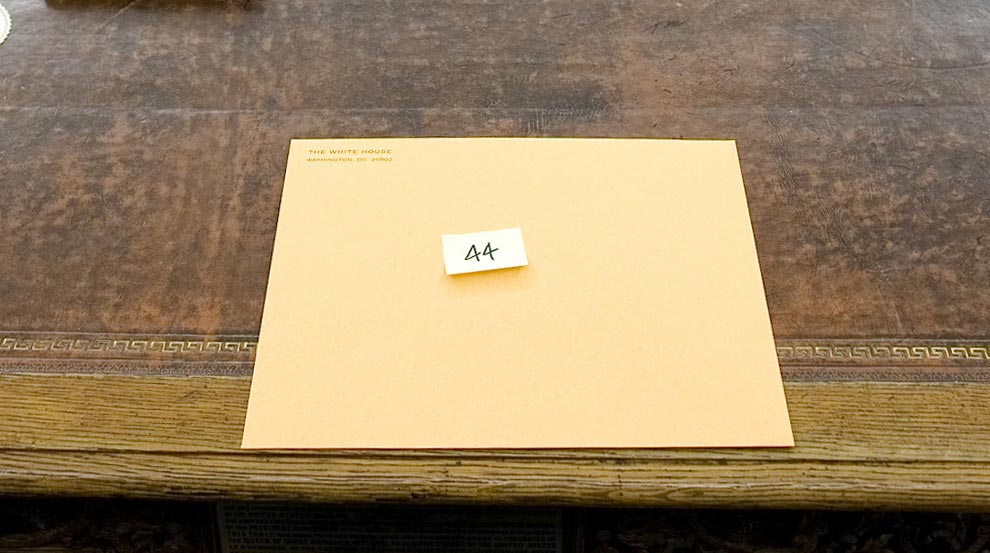
In keeping with tradition, President Bush left a letter (shown here on the Resolute desk) to Obama in the Oval Office.

The first family visited both Sidwell Friends School and Georgetown Day School before deciding on Sidwell. The residential transition began with the first of two interim stops at the Hay-Adams Hotel on January 4. The second interim stop was a move to Blair House on January 15, the traditional interim move date for residents-elect. The residential transition began earlier than for most incoming presidents because the daughters began school at Sidwell on January 5. During the campaign, Michelle Obama had stated that the residential transition would be planned to be as unified as possible for all members of the family. Michelle's mother, Marian Robinson, made plans to move into the White House to assist with child care. In the current real estate market, the Obamas did not intend to sell their South Side Chicago home that sits on the border between the Hyde Park and Kenwood community areas.

Jenna and Barbara Bush had much advice for Malia and Sasha Obama. The Bush twins sent the Obama daughters an open letter that was published in The Wall Street Journal.

The outgoing Bush family did not take much with them as they left the White House. Among the items they left behind was their official state china service, a Lenox gilt-edged style with a green basket weave border, estimated to be worth $492,798. However, what they did not take with them can be included in the collection of the presidential library.

Vice President Dick Cheney was injured moving out of his residence just before the inauguration and used a wheelchair during the ceremony.

== Assessment of the transition ==
Experts have given the transition high praise. Numerous experts have referred to the transition between Bush and Obama as the "gold standard" for presidential transitions. Both the Bush and Obama ends of the transition have been praised.

The transition has been praised as "seamless", in part, for its adherence to Obama's insistence that there be "one president at a time", with Obama largely avoiding giving comment during the transition on matters Bush was handling, such as the 2008 financial crisis.

== See also ==
- Barack Obama 2008 presidential campaign
- Barack Obama election victory speech 2008
- First inauguration of Barack Obama
