= Citizen's Briefing Book =

Book of recommendations made to President Barack Obama

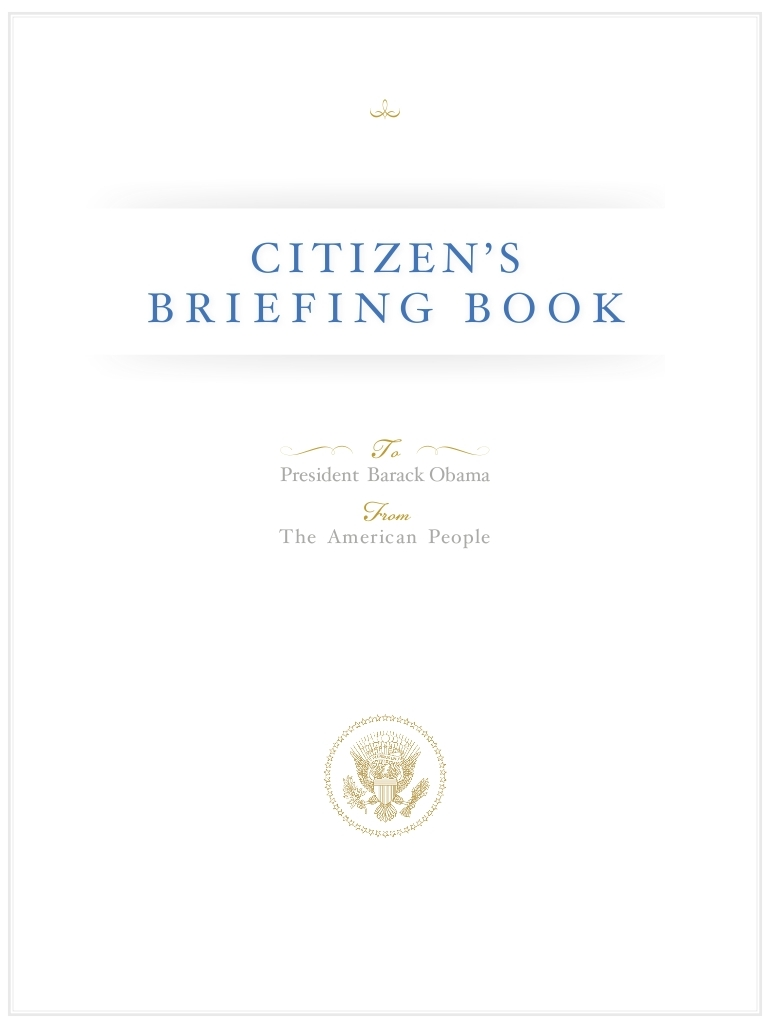
- Cover
- Author: Obama-Biden Transition Team, from Internet recommendations
- Language: English
- Subject: Recommendations for President Barack Obama
- Publisher: Obama administration
- Publication date: May 11, 2009
- Publication place: United States
- Pages: 33

Citizen's Briefing Book is a compilation book of recommendations made to President Barack Obama by visitors to the Change.gov website, given to the President after his January 20, 2009 inauguration. Internet users were able to post recommendations of changes they would like to see made in the United States, and they were also able to vote on other users' recommendations, as well as participate in a comment process.

The Minnesota-based company called Magnet 360 helped develop the functionality, using technology from Salesforce.com. Co-chair of the Obama-Biden Transition Team, Valerie Jarrett, stated that the Citizen's Briefing Book was a way for the Obama transition process to remain open and transparent. Popular recommendations included ending the prohibition on marijuana use in the United States and the legalization of online poker. Citizen's Briefing Book received positive comments from writers for The Christian Science Monitor and Business Week, and criticism from writers for Chicago Tribune and Indianapolis Business Journal.

== Comment process ==
Citizen's Briefing Book is a work of suggestions by individuals compiled into a book format and submitted to President Barack Obama after his inauguration on January 20, 2009. Internet users originally posted their suggestions at Change.gov, with the plan that after Barack Obama was sworn in as president the website hosting the recommendations would direct users to Whitehouse.gov. The option to participate in the request for comment format was open until January 20, 2009, where users were able to post suggestions to the President, read others' recommendations, and comment on each other's ideas. Users voted on individual recommendations with an up or down vote for each suggestion.

The web function was developed for the Obama transition team by the Minnesota-based company called Magnet 360, and utilizes technology from Salesforce.com. Co-chair of the Obama-Biden Transition Team, Valerie Jarret, stated: "The Citizen's Briefing Book will come directly from the American people. It is yet another way that we will ensure that this transition is the most open and transparent one in history." Members of Obama's transition team interacted with users and responded to the voting. Beth Noveck, a law professor at NYU Law School and a member of the Obama administration's "Technology, Innovation and Government Reform Team", stated that the book would help the government "get the best ideas for the beginning of the administration".

== Top recommendations ==
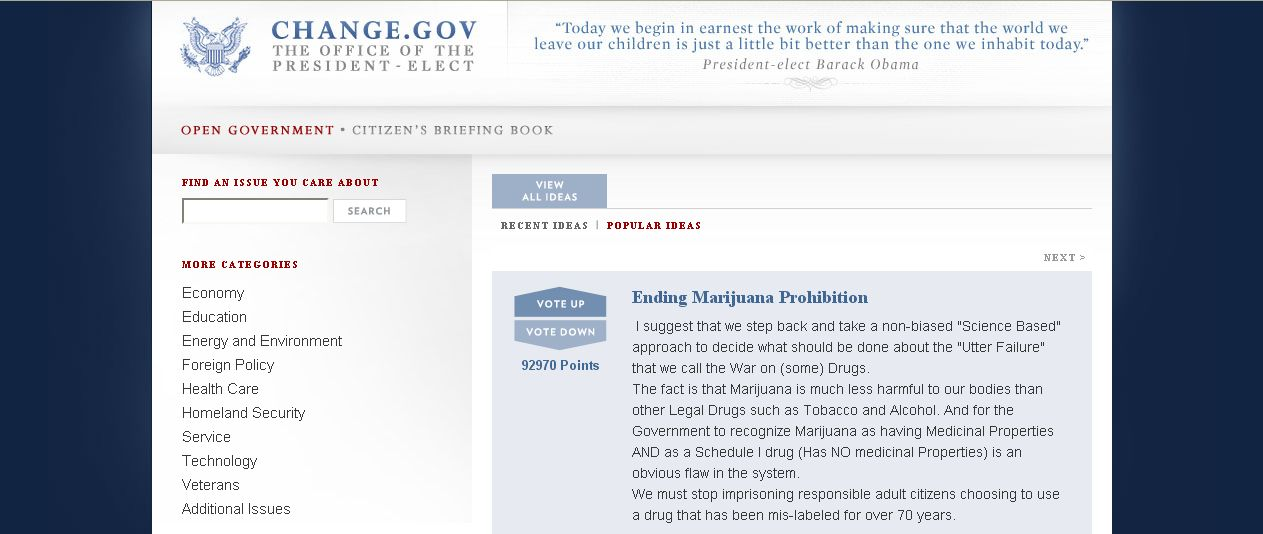
Most popular vote on citizensbriefingbook.change.gov (January 20, 2009)

According to the Change.gov site the best-rated ideas would "rise to the top" of the list, to later be given to the President. As of January 17, 2009 the most popular suggestion, with 70,520 points, advocated ending the prohibition on marijuana use in the United States. By January 19, 2009, over 500,000 people had voted on thousands of suggestions posted by 70,000 individuals. In total over 44,000 suggestions were submitted, with over 1.4 million votes cast for the various recommendations.

Other popular ideas included legalizing online poker in the United States, and focusing on green initiatives. One post suggested the administration investigate UFOs, and another suggested Obama hire entertainment personalities including Michael Moore, Jon Stewart, Bill Maher, and Stephen Colbert. After voting had closed, the most popular suggestion with 92,000 votes was "Ending marijuana prohibition", and the third most popular: "Stop using federal resources to undermine states' medicinal marijuana laws." A representative for President Obama, Jen Psaki, told Reuters: "President Obama does not support the legalization of marijuana."

== Release ==
President Barack Obama discussing the Citizen's Briefing Book (May 11, 2009)

The Obama administration released the Citizen's Briefing Book to the public on May 11, 2009, the same day that President Obama announced the renaming of the White House Office of Public Liaison to the Office of Public Engagement. "Many of the ideas you offer, from improving light rail transit to modernizing our energy grid to creating a new service corps, have been embraced by my administration," said President Obama in a video released along with the briefing book.

== Reception ==
Writing for The Christian Science Monitor, David Peck described the initiative as part of "a good foundation" of reaching out to individuals. Douglas MacMillan of Business Week noted that the Obama transition site Change.gov "won praise for its clean look and Citizen's Briefing Book feature". Joel Hood of the Chicago Tribune highlighted some of the more eccentric suggestions posted, commenting: "As if President Barack Obama doesn't have enough on his plate, he's about to hear the voice of the people, in all its eccentric glory."

Morton Marcus commented in the Indianapolis Business Journal: "I see the virtue of being open to the public’s concern. I cannot imagine that the president will give attention to issues based on their popularity." In noting that the first and third-most popular items voted upon involved the legalization of marijuana, Andy Sullivan of Reuters commented on President Obama's efforts to solicit opinions from citizens on legislation: "That approach can deliver unexpected results."

== See also ==
- Presidential transition of Barack Obama
