= Cassandra Butts =

American lawyer

Personal details
- Born: August 10, 1965 New York City, U.S.
- Died: May 25, 2016 (aged 50) Washington, D.C., U.S.
- Party: Democratic
- Education: University of North Carolina, Chapel Hill (BA); Harvard University (JD)

Cassandra Quin Butts (August 10, 1965 – May 25, 2016) was an American lawyer, policy expert, and Deputy White House Counsel. On December 23, 2008, Butts was selected by President-elect Barack Obama to serve as Deputy White House Counsel, focusing on domestic policy and ethics. She was on the advisory board for then-President-elect Obama's presidential transition team.

She stepped down as Deputy White House Counsel in November 2009 and served as senior advisor in the office of the chief executive officer at the Millennium Challenge Corporation. In February 2014, Obama nominated her to be the Ambassador to the Bahamas, but by February 1, 2015, the Senate had not confirmed her to the post.

She was re-nominated to the position on February 5, 2015, but died more than a year later as her nomination continued to face a hold by Arkansas Senator Tom Cotton.

== Biography ==
Butts was born on August 10, 1965, in Brooklyn, New York, and at age nine moved to Durham, North Carolina. She graduated from the University of North Carolina at Chapel Hill and in 1991 from Harvard Law School where she was a classmate of Barack Obama and the two became close friends.

Butts' first job was as a counselor at the YMCA in Durham. From 1991-92, she worked as a fellow with the National Health Law Program (NHeLP), a nonprofit organization advocating for access to quality healthcare for low-income people. After college she worked for a year as a researcher with the African News Service in Durham.

She was an election observer in the 2000 Zimbabwean parliamentary election and counsel to Senator Harris Wofford (D-PA). She also did litigation and policy work for the NAACP Legal Defense and Educational Fund Inc, and spent seven years working as a senior adviser to US Representative Dick Gephardt of Missouri. She became the senior vice president for domestic policy at the Center for American Progress.

== Deputy White House Counsel ==
During her time as Deputy White House Counsel, Butts focused most on judicial nominations. Records later showed that in the days after Associate Justice David Souter announced his retirement from the U.S. Supreme Court, Butts was in frequent contact with President Obama's eventual nominee to replace Souter, Sonia Sotomayor.

Butts also had been rumored in February 2009 to be a candidate to lead the Equal Employment Opportunity Commission (EEOC).

== Millennium Challenge Corporation ==
On November 6, 2009, Obama named Butts to serve as a senior advisor in the Office of the chief executive officer of the Millennium Challenge Corporation. Butts' departure was considered to be one of the highest-level departures up to that point from the office of the White House Counsel, and it was followed one week later by the announcement of the departure of Butts' then-boss, White House Counsel Gregory Craig.

== Nomination to be Ambassador to the Bahamas ==
On February 7, 2014, Butts was nominated by President Obama to be United States Ambassador to the Bahamas. The Senate held a committee hearing on her nomination in May 2014, but took no action the rest of the year, and her nomination lapsed with the end of the 113th United States Congress.

With the new Congress, Obama renominated her to the post on February 5, 2015. The United States Senate Committee on Foreign Relations reported her nomination to the full U.S. Senate on May 21, 2015. However, Butts' nomination was blocked by several Republican senators. First, Senator Ted Cruz placed a blanket hold on all U.S. State Department nominees after he was upset with Obama for the Iran nuclear deal. However, after Cruz lifted those holds, Senator Tom Cotton then stepped in and once again, to protest an issue unrelated to the specific nominees, blocked Butts' nomination and the nominations of ambassador nominees to Sweden and Norway after the Secret Service had leaked private information about a fellow member of Congress. Cotton later lifted his holds on the nominees to Sweden and Norway, but kept his hold on Butts' nomination.

Butts told New York Times columnist Frank Bruni that she had visited Cotton about his objections to her nomination, and Cotton told her that because he knew that Obama and Butts were friends, blocking Butts was a way to "inflict special pain on the president," Bruni wrote. According to Bruni's article, a spokeswoman for Cotton did not dispute Butts' account but did emphasize Cotton's respect for Butts and for her career.

Butts died on May 25, 2016, still awaiting a Senate vote. For several weeks after Butts' death, her nomination had remained pending before the U.S. Senate on its executive calendar. Obama formally withdrew her nomination on June 9, 2016.

== Death ==
Butts was found dead in her Washington, D.C. home by her sister on May 25, 2016. According to a statement from her family she had suffered from a brief illness. Bruni wrote that she had suffered from acute leukemia and had not felt ill until just beforehand.
