= Sudafi Henry =

American government official

Director of Legislative Affairs for the Vice President of the United States
- In office January 20, 2009 – ?
- Vice President: Joe Biden

Personal details
- Children: two
- Education: University of Maryland at College Park, George Washington University Law School
- Profession: attorney

Sudafi S. Henry is the former Director of Legislative Affairs for Joe Biden, the Vice President of the United States from 2009 to 2017.

Henry was previously Counsel and Senior Policy Advisor for House Majority Leader Steny Hoyer (D-MD), working closely with Congress, leadership staff and committee staff on crafting and winning passage of critical legislation, with a particular focus on trade, telecommunications, economic matters and responses to the current financial crisis. Henry has also served as a liaison for Rep. Hoyer to policy experts, business leaders, and constituency group leaders on pending legislation. Henry has more than 10 years of experience on Capitol Hill, including his work for Reps. Major Owens (D-NY) and Emanuel Cleaver (D-MO) as the Legislative Director for both Members. A native of Los Angeles, California, Henry received a B.A. from the University of Maryland at College Park and a J.D. from George Washington University Law School, and is a member of the Maryland bar.
