= Melody Barnes =

American lawyer and political advisor (born 1964)

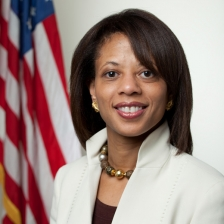

Director of the Domestic Policy Council
- In office January 20, 2009 – January 10, 2012
- President: Barack Obama
- Deputy: Heather Higginbottom; Mark Zuckerman
- Preceded by: Karl Zinsmeister
- Succeeded by: Cecilia Muñoz

Personal details
- Born: Melody C. Barnes; April 29, 1964 (age 62)
- Party: Democratic
- Spouse: Marland Buckner (m. 2009)
- Education: University of North Carolina, Chapel Hill (BA); University of Michigan, Ann Arbor (JD)

Melody C. Barnes (born April 29, 1964) is an American lawyer and political advisor. Formerly an aide and chief counsel to Senator Ted Kennedy on the Senate Judiciary Committee, Barnes later worked at the Center for American Progress, a think tank, before joining Senator Barack Obama's 2008 presidential campaign. When Obama became president, Barnes was appointed director of the Domestic Policy Council, serving from January 2009 to January 2012. Barnes then assumed roles at the Aspen Institute and New York University. Since 2016, she has been at the University of Virginia (UVA), where she teaches law and is the co-director of the UVA Democracy Initiative.

== Early life and education ==
Barnes was born to an African-American family on April 29, 1964, and grew up in Richmond, Virginia. Her father Charles H. Barnes Jr. was a civilian employee of the U.S. Army, and her mother Mary Frances Rogers Barnes (1934–2014) was a teacher.

Barnes earned her BA with honors in history from the University of North Carolina at Chapel Hill in 1986 and her JD from the University of Michigan Law School in 1989. Barnes is a member of the Alpha Kappa Alpha sorority.

== Career ==
=== Pre-White House ===
In 1989, Barnes began her career as an attorney with the law firm of Shearman & Sterling in New York City as an associate in corporate finance and financial institutions.

Barnes then worked at the Raben Group, where she lobbied for the American Civil Liberties Union, Leadership Conference on Civil Rights, American Constitution Society, and Center for Reproductive Rights. Barnes served as director of legislative affairs at the Equal Employment Opportunity Commission and as assistant counsel of the Subcommittee on Civil and Constitutional Rights of the House Judiciary Committee. In the latter role, Barnes worked on the Voting Rights Improvement Act of 1992.

Barnes was general counsel to Senator Edward M. Kennedy on the Senate Judiciary Committee from 1995 to 1998, and chief counsel from 1998 to 2003.

From 2003 to July 2008, Barnes worked for the Center for American Progress, a [[progressivism in the United States]|progressive]] think tank. She was executive vice president for policy at the center from 2005 to 2008. Barnes was involved in the launch of the center's Initiative on Faith and Public Policy. She worked under CEO John D. Podesta, who later served as co-chairman of the Obama-Biden transition team.

Barnes was senior domestic policy advisor to Senator Barack Obama during his 2008 presidential campaign. After the election, Barnes helped to lead Obama's transition team. Barnes served as co-director of the Agency Review Working Group for the transition.

Prior to joining the White House, Barnes served on the board of a Washington, D.C. charter school, as well as the boards of EMILY's List and the Planned Parenthood Action Fund.

=== White House ===
After Obama took office in January 2009, Barnes became assistant to the president and director of the White House Domestic Policy Council.

In October 2009, Barnes played golf with Obama at Fort Belvoir, becoming the first woman to play golf with the president during Obama's presidency. (Obama had previously been criticized for playing golf and basketball only with male staffers).

Barnes was one of several African-American women in important Obama administration positions, along with Valerie Jarrett, Mona Sutphen, Susan Rice and Cassandra Butts.

As a former staffer for Ted Kennedy, Barnes was also one of a number of former congressional staffers in the Obama White House, alongside Jim Messina (formerly aide to Senator Max Baucus), Pete Rouse and Jeanne Lambrew (Senator Tom Daschle), Phil Schiliro (formerly aide to Representative Henry Waxman), and Lisa Konwinski (former aide to Senator Kent Conrad). Paul Starr writes that Obama's choice to surround himself with these former senior aides to key congressional leaders on health care was instrumental in passing the health-care reform legislation through Congress.

Barnes chaired the White House Task Force on Childhood Obesity, which in May 2010 released a 124-page report with 70 recommendations to combat the childhood obesity epidemic in the United States.

In November 2011, the White House announced that Barnes would be leaving. She departed in January 2012.

=== Post-White House ===
After leaving the White House, Barnes became chief executive officer of Melody Barnes Solutions LLC, a strategy firm advising major financial institutions and other clients. She joined the boards of directors of Ventas, Inc. in 2014, Booz Allen Hamilton in 2015, and the Hewlett Foundation in 2023.

Barnes is chair of the Aspen Institute's Forum for Community Solutions.

In 2013, Barnes has also been vice provost for global student leadership initiatives at New York University, and senior fellow at NYU's Robert F. Wagner Graduate School of Public Service.

Since 2018, Barnes has been a co-director of UVA's Democracy Initiative, a broad research, teaching and public affairs initiative tackling the most pressing issues facing democracies around the world. She is a professor of practice at UVA's Miller Center, after having served since 2016 as a visiting professor and senior fellow there and a distinguished fellow at the School of Law.

== Awards and honors ==
In 2016, Barnes received the "Strong Men & Women in Virginia History" award from the Library of Virginia and Dominion Power.

== Personal life ==
On June 13, 2009, Barnes married Marland Buckner Jr., a former chief of staff to U.S. Representative Harold Ford Jr., in Washington, D.C..

In 2007, Barnes was featured in a Washingtonian magazine list of ten well-dressed Washington women.

Political offices
Preceded by Karl Zinsmeister	Director of the Domestic Policy Council; 2009–2012	Succeeded by Cecilia Muñoz
