= Chief Performance Officer of the United States =

U.S. government position

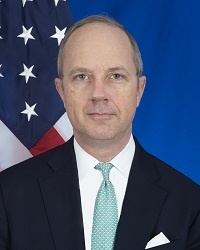
- Incumbent; Eric Ueland since May 21, 2025
- Formation: June 19, 2009
- First holder: Jeffrey Zients

Chief Performance Officer of the United States (CPO) is a position in the Office of Management and Budget (within the Executive Office of the President of the United States), first announced on January 7, 2009, by then President-elect Barack Obama. The post concentrates on the federal budget and government reform.

== History ==
Obama selected Nancy Killefer to be the first CPO/Deputy OMB Director for Management, but before the Senate could vote on her confirmation, she withdrew her nomination, citing a "personal tax issue" as a likely distraction for the Obama administration. Jeffrey Zients was nominated as CPO on April 18, 2009, and confirmed by the Senate on June 19, 2009. He was succeeded by Beth Cobert.

== List of officeholders ==
No.	Portrait	Name	Term of office		President(s) served under
No.	Portrait	Name	Start	End	President(s) served under
1		Jeff Zients	June 19, 2009	October 16, 2013	Barack Obama
2		Beth Cobert	October 16, 2013	July 10, 2015	Barack Obama
–		Kathleen McGettigan (acting)	July 10, 2015	January 20, 2017	Barack Obama
Vacant					Donald Trump
3		Jason Miller	April 28, 2021	January 20, 2025	Joe Biden
4		Eric Ueland	May 21, 2025	Incumbent	Donald Trump

== See also ==
- Inspector general
- Ombudsman
