= James Braid =

James Braid may refer to:

- James Braid (golfer) (1870–1950), Scottish golfer
- James Braid (politician) (1912–1999), Scottish nationalist politician
- James Braid (surgeon) (1795–1860), Scottish surgeon and "gentleman scientist"
- James Braid (government official), American political advisor

== See also ==
- James Braid Taylor (1891–1943), British banker
