= Reema Dodin =

American political advisor

Personal details
- Born: North Carolina, U.S.
- Party: Democratic
- Education: University of California, Berkeley (BA); University of Illinois, Urbana–Champaign (JD)

Reema Dodin is an American political advisor who served as the deputy director of the White House Office of Legislative Affairs in the Biden administration. Upon taking office, she became the highest ranking Palestinian-American woman to serve in the Executive Office of the President of the United States. She is the former deputy chief of staff and floor director for Dick Durbin as the Senate Democratic Whip. In 2025, she was named chief of staff to U.S. Senator Brian Schatz.

== Early life and education ==
Dodin was born in North Carolina. Her parents, Bajis and Samia Dodin, are Palestinian. Dodin's parents immigrated to the United States in the 1970s from Dura, Hebron in the West Bank. Her grandfather is Mustafa Dodin, a social affairs minister in Jordan who was involved Israeli-Palestinian peace negotiations in the 1970s.

Dodin earned her Bachelor of Arts from the University of California, Berkeley in political science and economics in 2002. While there, she participated in social justice and public health work. In 2006, Dodin interned in Senator Dick Durbin's office. That same year, she earned her Juris Doctor from the University of Illinois at Urbana–Champaign.

== Career ==
Dodin returned to work for Senator Dick Durbin after graduation in the fall of 2006. Her early years with Durbin were spent as an aide for the United States Senate Committee on the Judiciary's subcommittee on human rights. Dodin's latter years were spent in his leadership whip office, as counsel, then director, and then as his deputy chief of staff, managing his whip and floor operations. His farewell address for her noted her contributions to several major legislative items.

Dodin volunteered as voter protection counsel through several elections. She volunteered for President Barack Obama's 2008 presidential campaign focusing on voter rights and for Hillary Clinton's 2016 presidential campaign.

In 2017, she co-authored Inside Congress: A Guide for Navigating the Politics of the House and Senate Floors published by the Brookings Institution.

Ms. Dodin served as a Term Member on the Council of Foreign Relations. She is also a fellow for the Truman National Security Project and the New Leaders Council.

In November 2020, Dodin began working, as a volunteer, on the presidential transition of Joe Biden, overseeing legislative engagement between the transition and Capitol Hill on nominations.

Dodin was named Deputy Director of the White House Office of Legislative Affairs, alongside Shuwanza Goff, for the Biden administration in November 2020. Her role in the Biden administration makes her the highest ranking Palestinian-American woman to serve in the Executive Office of the President of the United States.

== Personal life ==
Dodin is the oldest of four siblings.

== Works ==
- Alongside Trevor Corning and Kyle Nevins, Dodin is the co-author of Inside Congress: A Guide for Navigating the Politics of the House and Senate Floors published by the Brookings Institution in 2017. ISBN 0815727321

== See also ==
- Rula Hassanein
