= Brian Fallon (press secretary) =

American political activist

Personal details
- Born: 1981 or 1982 (age 44–45)
- Party: Democratic
- Spouse: Katie Beirne
- Education: Harvard University (BA)

Brian Edward Fallon Jr. (born 1981 or 1982) is an American political operative. He was the national press secretary for Hillary Clinton's 2016 presidential campaign, a role he began in March 2015, and was a senior advisor in Kamala Harris's 2024 presidential campaign. In 2018, he founded the legal advocacy organization Demand Justice.

== Career ==
Fallon graduated cum laude from Harvard, where he covered sports for The Harvard Crimson. During the 2004 presidential election, Fallon worked on the Kerry–Edwards presidential campaign as a press aide. During the 2006 Senate election in New Jersey, Fallon served as campaign press secretary to Senator Robert Menendez. Fallon then became chief spokesman for Senator Chuck Schumer of New York, and in 2011 additionally became spokesman for the new Senate Democratic Policy and Communications Center. In 2013, Fallon left Schumer's office and moved to the Justice Department, with Attorney General Eric Holder hiring him as the department's director of public affairs.

Fallon joined Hillary Clinton's 2016 presidential campaign in March 2015, as national press secretary.

In February 2017, he joined CNN as a political commentator, based in Washington, D.C. In October 2017, he caused controversy by tweeting [General] "Kelly isnt just an enabler of Trump. He's a believer in him. That makes him as odious as the rest. Dont be distracted by the uniform." At its founding in May 2018, Fallon became executive director of Demand Justice, a 501(c)(4) advocacy organization. In the first Demand Justice report card, Fallon gave Senator Chuck Schumer, his former boss, a "C" rating. This damaged his relationship with Schumer. When asked about his relationship with Schumer, whom he does not directly criticize, Fallon declined to "answer any questions about Chuck."

In 2023, Fallon stepped down from Demand Justice to join Joe Biden's 2024 presidential campaign as communications director for Kamala Harris. After Harris was elevated to the top of the ticket, he became a senior communications advisor.

== Personal life ==
In 2012, Fallon married to Katie Beirne Fallon, the former White House Director of Legislative Affairs and head of the White House Office of Legislative Affairs for the administration of U.S. President Barack Obama. They have twin sons and a daughter.
