= White House Office of Health Reform =

US government entity

The White House Office of Health Reform was a new government entity in the United States created by President Barack Obama. The office was a component of the Domestic Policy Council in the Office of White House Policy. The Director of the Office of Health Reform is titled the Deputy Assistant to the President and Director of Office of Health-Care Reform. The first and last Director was Nancy-Ann Min DeParle. Obama had originally picked former Senator Tom Daschle for the role, but Daschle withdrew after a scandal broke over his non-payment of taxes. Jeanne Lambrew served as Deputy Director from 2009 to 2011. Linda Douglass served as the office's director of communications from May 2009 to April 2010.

In 2011, the White House abolished the Office of Health Reform and transferred its work to the Domestic Policy Council. Melody Barnes, who was the Director of the Domestic Policy Council at the time, assumed the duties of the office.
