= William Timmons (lobbyist) =

American lobbyist (1930–2025)

Bill Timmons

White House Director of Legislative Affairs
- In office November 5, 1969 – December 31, 1974
- President: Richard Nixon; Gerald Ford
- Preceded by: Barefoot Sanders
- Succeeded by: Max Friedersdorf

Personal details
- Born: William Evan Timmons; December 27, 1930 Chattanooga, Tennessee, U.S.
- Died: October 1, 2025 (aged 94) Washington, D.C., U.S.
- Party: Republican
- Education: Georgetown University (BS)

William Evan Timmons (December 27, 1930 – October 1, 2025) was an American lobbyist who worked for all Republican presidents since Richard Nixon and for Democratic President Jimmy Carter. John McCain's 2008 presidential campaign asked Timmons to conduct a study in preparation for the presidential transition if McCain won the presidential election.

Timmons was chairman emeritus of lobbying firm Timmons & Company, which he founded in 1975 after he left President Gerald Ford's administration. He was an aide to Senator Alexander Wiley, administrative assistant to Representative Bill Brock, and Assistant for Legislative Affairs to Presidents Richard Nixon and Gerald Ford.

== Background ==
Timmons was born in Chattanooga, Tennessee, and graduated from Baylor School, a military high school, in 1949. He served in the United States Air Force from 1951 to 1955 during the Korean War era. He graduated with a bachelor of science from Georgetown University in 1959. He has three children and nine grandchildren. He was a 33rd-degree Freemason, past officer of the Sons of the American Revolution, and was an active member of the Society of the Cincinnati and various state and county historical organizations. He has served on boards or advisory commissions for Georgetown University's Business School, the International College at the University of South Carolina, Parent's Council of Texas Christian University, and the Center for Strategic and International Studies.

Timmons died in Washington, D.C. on October 1, 2025, at the age of 94.

== Convention and campaign management ==
Timmons was the national convention manager for Nixon in 1968 and 1972, Ford in 1976, Reagan in 1980 and 1984. He also was a convention advisor to George H. W. Bush in 1988, and George W. Bush in 2000. Timmons was campaign manager for Rep. Bill Brock in 1962, 1964, and 1968. He received the National Young Republican of the Year award in 1965, and was head of congressional relations for the Nixon–Agnew campaign in 1968. In 1980 Timmons was the national political director for the Reagan–Bush campaign. As Republican National Committee manager, Timmons organized "with extraordinary precision" the 1972 convention to re-elect Nixon, marking a "sea change" in the design and execution of conventions as massive media events, according to Republican convention veteran Bill Greener; "Since then, the move toward planning conventions as TV events continues," he said. During Bob Dole's 1996 presidential campaign, Timmons headed the efforts to plan for a potential presidential transition if Dole were to win.

Career political consultant F. Clifton White said "Timmons had been one of the young recruits who worked with me on the Goldwater campaign, and he already signed up to work for Reagan as political director. I had a great deal of respect for him because he had beaten me in 1968 when I backed Reagan and he was Nixon’s floor manager. Timmons showed me what he was capable of doing that year, and I regarded him as one of the best convention men in the country".

== Serving presidents ==
=== Richard Nixon ===
Timmons was the Assistant for Legislative Affairs for Richard Nixon during both of his terms. The Chicago Tribune reported "In the opinion of several White House insiders, the youngest and least publicized of the President's top assistants is probably the one most responsible for Nixon's strategy, tactics and successes in dealing with a Democratic-controlled Congress. He is William Timmons, 39." While attending a Washington party during the Nixon presidency, a hostess introduced Timmons as "the man who gets President Nixon's bills passed by Congress." Timmons smiled faintly and replied, "I'm glad I don't get paid on a commission basis." According to the writers of the 1982 publication Who Runs Washington, "Timmons was a loyalist who did all an honest man could for Nixon." Richard O. Jones, writing in 1999, commented that Nixon and Timmons were not very close and that, unlike his predecessor Harlow, Timmons did not "have the ear" of the President. According to Rowland Evans Jr. and Robert D. Novak, neither Nixon nor John Mitchell had full confidence in Timmons' ability to handle Congress. Therefore, in December 1970, Nixon, while praising Timmons in public, appointed Clark MacGregor to oversee Timmons and, more generally, all Congressional liaison, without informing Timmons beforehand.

The Strom Thurmond memo of February 7, 1972, recommending deportation of John Lennon, was addressed to Timmons in his role as assistant to President Nixon. The attached file from the Senate Internal Security Subcommittee associated Lennon with the Chicago Seven and noted that "This group has been strong advocates of the program to 'dump Nixon'." Thurmond told Timmons that "many headaches would be avoided if appropriate action were taken." Timmons responded to Thurmond on March 6, 1972, indicating that the Immigration and Naturalization Service had served a deportation notice on Lennon. The Nixon administration's failed attempt to deport Lennon before the 1972 US presidential election campaign season was illustrated by these memos, which were published in facsimile in 1975 and 2000.

Nixon opposed interpreting Title IX as applying to sports, and Timmons supported him in that view by endorsing the weakest enforcement of Title IX and advising, "[Let's] ban the babes!"

During the Watergate Scandal, after the October 1973 "Saturday night massacre" in which Nixon fired Attorney General Elliot Richardson and Deputy Attorney General William Ruckelshaus and ordered Robert Bork to remove Special Prosecutor Archibald Cox, Nixon asked Timmons to assess the reaction of Congress. After checking, Timmons wrote the first memo to Nixon assessing his likelihood of being impeached; he reported confidentially, "There is not sufficient support in the House to impeach the President, or in the Senate to convict him." As Nixon was struggling to remain in office, in early 1974, Timmons advised him to take advantage of the budget process "when there is strong congressional interest in pork projects. These hometown goodies are most important to many.... This is not the time to save nickels and dimes!" Timmons would eventually advise the president to resign. He believed "it was time for the President to pack it in" and that "a moment of principle had come that would let the President resign with honor – this decision would undermine all future Presidents’ authority and thus, in defense of future Presidents, Richard Nixon should, at this moment, resign. (After lunch, Timmons would speak to General Alexander Haig in San Clemente and ask that this advice be brought, in his name, immediately to the President.)"

=== Gerald Ford ===
Timmons continued as Assistant for Legislative Affairs for the Ford administration after Nixon resigned. Ford said "Timmons and I were ideologically in the same spectrum, and I liked him on a very personal basis, always trusted him. Bill’s a pro. He did a great job for Nixon, and under the toughest of circumstances." Timmons, who had the biggest office suite in the West Wing (other than the president's offices), and his team were offered to stay on as long as they liked. In 1974 Ford's advisors thought that Ronald Reagan would never challenge Ford, and Timmons disagreed with them. During the last week of the congressional campaign in Los Angeles, Timmons arranged two secret meetings between Ford and Reagan, and the relationship between the two men became warmer.

=== Jimmy Carter ===
On April 19, 1978, President Carter reappointed Timmons to the Advisory Committee for Trade Negotiations.

=== Ronald Reagan ===
Timmons was a key advisor to Reagan in his campaign against Carter for the 1980 presidential election. His major campaign theme was that Jimmy Carter was "dumb, dangerous, and deceptive," and he was one of two advisors who opposed Reagan engaging in a debate with Carter. Timmons handled congressional relations for the Reagan transition team. With James Baker, on the Legislative Strategy Group, he worked on lobbying for public and congressional support for the president's domestic and economic policies. In 1986 Reagan named Timmons to the US–Japan Advisory Commission. Both countries named members (roughly 12 in total) to study relationships between the two countries and make recommendations. The panel was nicknamed "Wise Men". The Wall Street Journal reported "Three years ago William Timmons was already one of the savviest, best-connected Republican lobbyists that American blue-chip companies could hire. Then President Reagan made him a Wise Man."

== Lobbying ==
After Timmons left the Ford White House, he formed Timmons & Company in 1975. Nicknamed the "Rain Maker" for his aptitude to spur change on Capitol Hill, Timmons has used his clout in a scrupulous fashion. It was reported in 1982 that throughout his years of work in Washington, Timmons had given an honorable name to lobbying.

According to a 1978 Time Magazine article, Timmons was among a small group of lobbyists leading opposition to a 1978 bill that would have required lobbyists "to reveal who pays them, who they represent, and what issues they have sought to shape." Time Magazine reported that the lobbyists were able to "kill" the bill, which stalled in Senator Abraham Ribicoff's Governmental Affairs Committee. In 1979, Chrysler Corporation hired lobbyist Tommy Boggs to influence Democrats, and Timmons, "a man skilled in gaining Republican sympathy for corporate causes," in their work to secure loan guarantees. It has been opined that "Chrysler ought to name a couple of new models after [Tommy] Boggs and Timmons."

In 1983–1986, Timmons lobbied for Bophuthatswana. According to Paul Volcker's Independent Inquiry Commission report commission by the United Nations, in 1992–1995 Timmons worked with entrepreneur Samir Vincent and public relations consultant John Venners in attempts to get an oil deal with Iraq, which was under UN sanctions at the time. Timmons and seven employees of Timmons and Company were listed as lobbyists for Bristol-Myers Squibb with "revolving door" connections to government in 2001 by Public Citizen; they listed the same eight in 2002 and 2003.

In 2008, the Obama campaign, which itself had an unpaid advisor from Timmons & Co. (later hired as an employee), referred to Timmons as "one of Washington’s most famous and powerful lobbyists" when Timmons was tapped for planning help by the McCain campaign. Time Magazine reported that Timmons's lobbying registrations "include work on a number of issues that have become flashpoints in the presidential campaign. He has registered to work on bills that deal with the regulations of troubled mortgage lenders Freddie Mac and Fannie Mae, a bill to provide farm subsidies and bills that regulate domestic oil-drilling."

== See also ==
- Lobbying in the United States

Political offices
Preceded by Barefoot Sanders	White House Director of Legislative Affairs; 1969–1974	Succeeded by Max Friedersdorf
