= Task Force on Childhood Obesity =

United States government task force

The Childhood Obesity Task Force is a United States government task force charged with reducing childhood obesity in the United States. It was founded on February 9, 2010, by the Obama administration through a presidential memorandum, announcing the establishment of a Task Force on Childhood Obesity. The task force aims to develop a plan to reduce childhood obesity. In the announcement, President Barack Obama highlighted the statistics on childhood obesity in the United States and outlined the steps that this new task force would be taking to end childhood obesity. Section 1 of the memorandum states:

There is established a Task Force on Childhood Obesity (Task Force) to develop an interagency action plan to solve the problem of obesity among our Nation's children within a generation. The Assistant to the President for Domestic Policy shall serve as Chair of the Task Force.

The task force is designed to support the administration's "Let's Move!" initiative, first announced by Michelle Obama in February 2010. The Let's Move initiative is similar to the task force, except it focuses on involving more partners in the cause to reduce childhood obesity than just the United States government.

== Goals ==
The goals of the Childhood Obesity Task Force were outlined by First Lady Michelle Obama in the Task Force Action Plan. The plan includes five goals which are supported by 70 specific recommendations.

1. Getting children a healthy start on life

This first goal includes recommendations for getting good prenatal care for mothers, support for breastfeeding, adherence to limits on screen time, and childcare with nutritious food and opportunities for children to be physically active. Goals were set to increase the amount of fruits that children eat to 75% of the recommended level by the year 2015, with an 85% increase by 2020, then 100% in the year 2030. Other plans included using the same scale to increase vegetable consumption in children and to decrease amounts of added sugar to many products.

2. Empowering parents and caregivers

The second goal of the task force is to educate parents and caregivers with easier to read nutritional labels and food menus which adhere to the latest Dietary Guidelines for Americans. Improved health care services and testing to include Body Mass Index measurement for children is also part of this goal. This goal also aims to reduce the marketing of unhealthy food to children. Michelle Obama said that by the year 2012, all primary care physicians should be measuring BMI index for children.

3. Providing healthy foods in schools

The fight for this particular goal has been referenced in the television series Jamie Oliver's Food Revolution. This goal aims for federally supported schools to begin serving healthy options to children, and to upgrade the nutritional quality of the food sold in schools. Nutrition education is also part of this goal. The task force recommends updating the nutritional standards in schools and "improving the nutritional quality of USDA commodities given to schools." It also recommends asking food companies to come up with new products and reformulate existing ones in food so that they meet nutritional standards based on Dietary Guidelines and are appealing to children.

4. Improving access to healthy, affordable food

Lowering prices on healthy foods, developing or re-formulating food products to be healthier, and eliminating "food deserts" (urban and rural areas with a shortage of grocery stores) in America are all part of this goal. The Deputy Secretary of Agriculture Kathleen Merrigan said that lack of access to healthy food leads to hunger, which subsequently leads to obesity, so this goal is trying to fix the root of the problem by making healthy options more available and affordable. The Task Force Report said that over the past 30 years, the prices for fruits and vegetables have increased nearly twice as fast as the price of carbonated drinks. The high price of fruits and vegetables can reduce consumers' ability to buy such healthy foods. "The Task Force recommends providing economic incentives to increase production of healthy foods, as well as create greater access to local and healthy food."

5. Getting children more physically active

The task force recommends physical education and recess along with after school physical activities to be available for all children. This goal also focuses on improving access to parks, playgrounds and indoor and outdoor recreational activities for children. The Task Force report recommends that children and adolescents get at least 60 minutes of exercise daily.

== Members ==
The members of the task force were outlined in the presidential memorandum. The following are the members of the task force as announced by President Obama outlined in the memorandum:

1. Secretary of the Interior: Secretary Ken Salazar
2. Secretary of Agriculture: Secretary Tom Vilsack
3. Secretary of Health and Human Services: Kathleen Sebelius
4. Secretary of Education: Arne Duncan
5. Director of the Office of Management and Budget: Jacob Lew
6. Assistant to the President and Chief of Staff to the First Lady: Melissa Winter
7. Assistant to the President for Economic Policy; and
8. heads of other executive departments, agencies, or offices as the Chair may designate.

Additionally, Michelle Obama, the first lady of the United States, as well as various members of the administration, including Melody Barnes, Barack Obama's domestic council, participate in the Task Force.

== Reception ==
In a May 2010 USA Today article, childhood obesity specialists praised the recommendations that the task force released. A director of nutrition policy for the Center for Science in the Public Interest said, "It's very comprehensive with lots of detailed recommendations that could make a real dent in childhood obesity. It lays out the steps that the federal government, schools, parents and food companies can take. These are not pie-in-the-sky recommendations. They are doable."
