= Eric Ueland =

American political aide (born 1965)

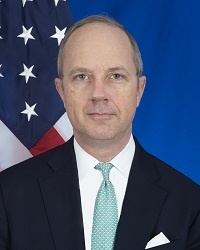
- Official portrait, 2018

Comptroller General of the United States
- Nominee
- Assuming office
- President: Donald Trump
- Succeeding: Gene Dodaro

Deputy Director of the Office of Management and Budget for Management
- Incumbent
- Assumed office May 21, 2025
- President: Donald Trump
- Preceded by: Jason Miller
Additional offices 2019‍–‍2026
Acting Administrator of the United States Agency for International Development
In office November 24, 2025 – October 3, 2026
President	Donald Trump
Preceded by	Russell Vought (acting)
Succeeded by	Bill Woolf (acting)
Acting Director of the United States Office of Government Ethics
In office July 15, 2025 – December 3, 2025
President	Donald Trump
Preceded by	Jamieson Greer (acting)
Succeeded by	Keith Sonderling (acting)
Acting Under Secretary of State for Civilian Security, Democracy, and Human Rights
In office December 21, 2020 – January 20, 2021
President	Donald Trump
Preceded by	Nathan Sales (acting)
Succeeded by	Lisa Peterson (acting)
White House Director of Legislative Affairs
In office June 17, 2019 – June 5, 2020
President	Donald Trump
Preceded by	Shahira Knight
Succeeded by	Amy Swonger

Personal details
- Born: Eric Matthew Ueland; July 12, 1965 (age 61) Portland, Oregon, U.S.
- Spouse: Cathleen O'Donnell (m. 1992)
- Children: 3
- Education: University of San Francisco (BA)

Eric Matthew Ueland (born July 12, 1965) is an American political aide, consultant, and lobbyist who has served as the deputy director of the Office of Management and Budget for management since 2025. Ueland served as the acting administrator of the United States Agency for International Development from 2025 to 2026, as the acting director of the United States Office of Government Ethics from July to December 2025, as the acting under secretary of state for civilian security, democracy, and human rights from 2020 to 2021, and as the White House director of legislative affairs from 2019 to 2020.

Ueland graduated from the University of San Francisco in 1988. He interned at The American Spectator, a conservative magazine, before working for the United States Senate Republican Policy Committee. Ueland served as the committee's research and communications director. In July 1996, he became an assistant staff director to Senate Majority Whip Don Nickles, the committee's chair. After the 2002 elections, Tennessee senator Bill Frist, who was set to become the senate majority leader, hired Ueland as his deputy chief of staff. Ueland became Frist's chief of staff in December 2004. In 2007, Ueland began working for the Duberstein Group, a lobbying firm. He returned to the Senate in June 2013 to serve as the minority staff director of the Senate Committee on the Budget. Ueland was an advisor for Donald Trump's 2016 presidential campaign.

In June 2017, Trump nominated Ueland to serve as the under secretary of state for management, although his nomination was not considered by the Senate. In June 2019, Trump appointed Ueland to serve as the White House director of legislative affairs. Ueland resigned as the White House director of legislative affairs after Trump nominated him to serve as the under secretary of state for civilian security, democracy, and human rights in May 2020. Ueland's nomination was not considered by the Senate before Trump lost the 2020 presidential election. Ueland served as the acting under secretary of state from December 2020 to January 2021. After Trump's loss, Ueland was appointed to the United States Commission on International Religious Freedom and was a visiting fellow at the Heritage Foundation.

After Trump's second inauguration in January 2025, Ueland began serving as the acting chief of staff at the Office of Management and Budget. In March, Trump nominated Ueland to serve as the agency's deputy director for management. He was confirmed by the Senate in May. Ueland was later appointed to additional positions, including as the acting director of the Office of Government Ethics in July and as the acting administrator of the United States Agency for International Development in November. Trump nominated Ueland to serve as the comptroller general of the United States in November 2026.

== Early life and education (1965–1988) ==
Eric Matthew Ueland was born on July 12, 1965, in Portland, Oregon. Ueland was the oldest of four children to Bob and Jane Ueland. He was raised in a Roman Catholic household. Ueland graduated from Central Catholic High School in Portland in 1984 and from the University of San Francisco in 1988. At the University of San Francisco, Ueland wrote for the San Francisco Foghorn and met Cathleen O'Donnell, whom he married in June 1992; they have three children.

== Career ==
=== Early work (1988–2007) ===
After graduating from the University of San Francisco, Ueland interned at The American Spectator, a conservative magazine. He later worked for the United States Senate Republican Policy Committee. By April 1993, Ueland had become the research and communications director of the committee. In July 1996, he became an assistant staff director to Senate Majority Whip Don Nickles, the committee's chair. Ueland advised Republicans not to seek an expedited impeachment trial against President Bill Clinton, arguing that it would work against the Senate's credibility and precedent. By February 2000, Ueland had become Nickles's chief of staff. Ueland and Nickles sought to pass a bill that would limit assisted suicide, although the measure was blocked by Oregon senator Ron Wyden.

Following the 2002 elections, in which Republicans took control of the Senate, Ueland became the chief of staff of the Senate Committee on Rules and Administration. After Bill Frist was elected as the Senate majority leader in December 2002, he hired Ueland to serve as his deputy chief of staff. In December 2004, Ueland became Frist's chief of staff. Ueland was involved in the 2005 nuclear option debate. After Sandra Day O'Connor announced her retirement, Ueland was one of several Republican staffers urging conservative allies not to attack Attorney General Alberto Gonzales, who was rumored to be considered as O'Connor's successor.

=== The Duberstein Group (2007–2013) ===
In 2007, Ueland began working for the Duberstein Group, a lobbying firm, as a vice president. At the Duberstein Group, Ueland was a lobbyist for the pharmaceutical company Novartis and the oil company BP. He informally advised Michigan representative Thaddeus McCotter's 2012 presidential campaign.

=== Legislative and campaign activities (2013–2017) ===
In June 2013, Politico reported that Ueland was returning to the Senate as the minority staff director of the Senate Committee on the Budget. Ueland had been hired by Alabama senator Jeff Sessions, the committee's ranking member. Ueland remained as the staff director after Wyoming senator Mike Enzi became the chairman of the Senate Committee on the Budget in 2015. In September 2016, Politico reported that Ueland had been working for Donald Trump's presidential campaign that year. His work included leading outreach to Congress and other institutions. After Trump won the 2016 election, he considered nominating Ueland as the director of the Office of Management and Budget or the White House director of legislative affairs, according to Roll Call. He oversaw the confirmation process of cabinet nominees. Ueland resigned from the Senate Committee on the Budget in September 2017.

== First Trump presidency (2017–2021) ==
On June 10, 2017, Trump announced that he was nominating Ueland to serve as the under secretary of state for management. Ueland's nomination was objected by some Democrats, who expressed concerns that Ueland could use legal workarounds to try to financially harm the Department of State. Ueland appeared before the Senate Committee on Foreign Relations on September 12. In response to a question from Maryland senator Ben Cardin asking if he would follow through on "congressional mandate and intent," Ueland stated that he would follow the law. Amid a dispute between Tennessee senator Bob Corker and Secretary of State Rex Tillerson, who brought in Ueland, Corker moved to delay Ueland's nomination in November. Ueland was not confirmed by the end of the Senate's first session, and Trump renominated him in January 2018, but withdrew his nomination in June.

By July 2018, Ueland had become a senior strategy officer at the Millennium Challenge Corporation. In October, he began serving as the director of the Office of U.S. Foreign Assistance Resources. In March 2019, Axios reported that Joe Grogan, the director of the Domestic Policy Council, had hired Ueland, purportedly for his knowledge of Senate procedure. After Shahira Knight was expected to resign as the White House director of legislative affairs, Ueland was one of several individuals suggested to succeed her, according to Politico. On June 13, Trump appointed Ueland to serve as the White House director of legislative affairs. He began serving in the position four days later. As the director of legislative affairs, Ueland was involved in gun control discussions following mass shootings in El Paso and Dayton.

As an impeachment inquiry into Trump mounted, Ueland led outreach to Congress. With the assistance of Stephen Miller, he drafted a letter to Speaker of the House Nancy Pelosi in December 2019, accusing her of violating her oath of office and "declaring open war on American Democracy" hours before the House of Representatives was set to vote on whether to impeach Trump. Secretary of the Treasury Steven Mnuchin and Ueland led negotiations over the CARES Act, a US$2.2 trillion economic stimulus bill. After Mark Meadows became the White House chief of staff, he moved to rearrange the White House Office, including Ueland's office. By July 2020, Ueland had become a senior advisor at the Department of State.

In May 2020, Ueland was nominated to serve as the under secretary of state for civilian security, democracy, and human rights. He appeared before the Senate Committee on Foreign Relations on September 22. Ueland was met with further skepticism from Democrats on the commitee, who noted his lack of foreign policy experience. Ueland served as the acting under secretary of state for civilian security, democracy and human rights from December 2020 to January 2021.

== Between presidencies (2021–2024) ==
After Trump lost the 2020 presidential election, Ueland joined the board of advisors for the Center for Constitutional Liberty at Benedictine College and became a visiting fellow at the Heritage Foundation. At the Heritage Foundation, he was involved in a policy project for a presumptive Republican administration. He was additionally appointed to the United States Commission on International Religious Freedom by Senate Minority Leader Mitch McConnell, and was reappointed to the commission in May 2024. Ueland assisted Pete Hegseth, President-elect Donald Trump's nominee to serve as the United States secretary of defense, meet with senators.

== Second Trump presidency (2025–present) ==
=== Initial tenure and appointments ===
By March 2025, Ueland had begun serving as the acting chief of staff at the Office of Management and Budget. On March 11, Trump nominated Ueland to serve as the deputy director of the Office of Management and Budget for management. Ueland appeared before the Senate Committee on Homeland Security and Governmental Affairs on April 3. He supported Trump's decision to remove collective bargaining rights from two-thirds of federal workers, describing employees for the federal government—including appointed and elected officials—as "at-will employees". The commitee voted on Ueland's nomination on April 9, and the Senate voted to confirm Ueland in a 52–45 vote on May 14.

At the Office of Management and Budget, Ueland sought to reorganize the federal government and improve the effectiveness of chief information officers at federal agencies. He described firing federal workers as "priority number one" in March 2026. After a federal government shutdown began in October 2025, Russell Vought, the director of the Office of Management and Budget, named several officials to manage the legal response to the shutdown, including Ueland.

Concurrently, Ueland served as the acting director of the United States Office of Government Ethics from August to December 2025. In November, Ueland was appointed as the acting administrator of the United States Agency for International Development, after serving as the agency's acting deputy director. He led the Trump administration's closure of the agency.

=== Comptroller general nomination ===
In October 2026, The Washington Sun reported that Trump had considered nominating Ueland to serve as the comptroller general of the United States, succeeding Gene Dodaro. The following month, several Democratic senators, including Senate Minority Leader Chuck Schumer and House Minority Leader Hakeem Jeffries, accused Republicans of attempting to install a "fox in the henhouse" at the United States Government Accountability Office. They claimed that Republicans had given them less than a day to submit candidates to serve as the comptroller general. On November 16, the Trump administration disclosed that Ueland had been nominated to serve as the comptroller general. Ueland's nomination elicited concerns from several Republican senators, including North Carolina senator Thom Tillis, Maine senator Susan Collins, and Utah senator John Curtis. Ueland's critics stated that he was too close to Vought, who has clashed with senators over the federal budget.

Ueland appeared before the Senate Committee on Homeland Security and Governmental Affairs on November 19. He stated that he would investigate the White House.

Political offices
Preceded by Shahira Knight	White House Director of Legislative Affairs; 2019–2020	Succeeded by Amy Swonger
Preceded by Nathan Sales; Acting	Under Secretary of State for Civilian Security, Democracy, and Human Rights; Acting; 2020–2021	Succeeded by Lisa Peterson; Acting
Preceded by Jason Miller	Deputy Director of the Office of Management and Budget for Management; 2025–present	Incumbent
Preceded by Jamieson Greer; Acting	Director of the United States Office of Government Ethics; Acting; 2025–2025	Succeeded by Keith Sonderling; Acting
Preceded by Russell Vought; Acting	Administrator of the United States Agency for International Development; Acting; 2025–2026	Succeeded by Bill Woolf; Acting
