= Jeanne Lambrew =

American government official

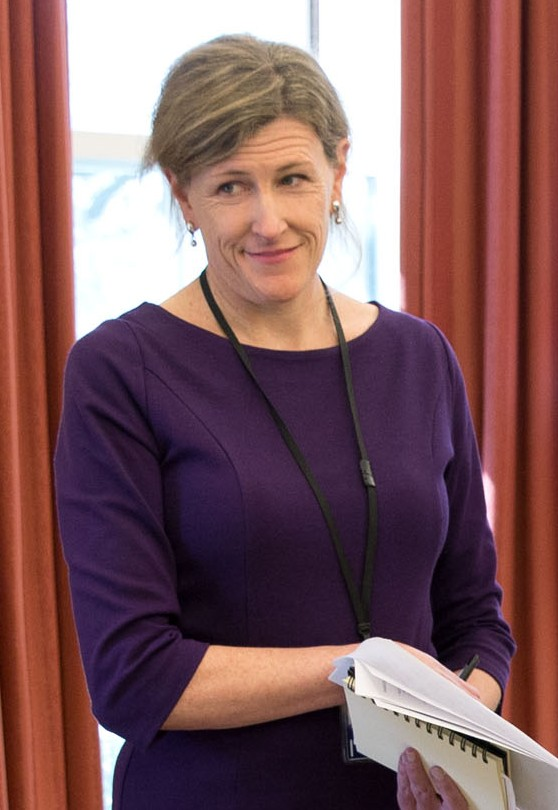

Commissioner of the Maine Department of Health and Human Services
- In office January 2, 2019 – 2024
- Governor: Janet Mills
- Preceded by: Bethany Hamm (Acting)
- Succeeded by: Sara Gagné-Holmes

Personal details
- Political party: Democratic
- Education: Amherst College (BA); University of North Carolina, Chapel Hill (MA, PhD)

Jeanne Lambrew is a United States professor of public affairs and health policy. She served in the Obama administration as Deputy Director of the White House Office of Health Reform.

In December 2018, Lambrew was nominated to serve as Commissioner of the Maine Department of Health and Human Services by Governor-elect Janet Mills. She resigned in 2024 to become the Director of Health Care Reform at the Century Foundation and Adjunct Professor of Health Policy at the Harvard T.H. Chan School of Public Health.

== Education ==
Lambrew earned a master's and a Ph.D. in Health Policy at the School of Public Health at the University of North Carolina-Chapel Hill. Her bachelor's degree came from Amherst College.

== Career ==
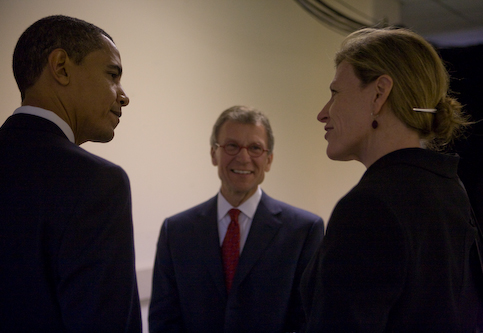
Barack Obama, Tom Daschle, and Jeanne Lambrew.

On May 11, 2009, Jeanne Lambrew was named by newly confirmed Health and Human Services Secretary Kathleen Sebelius to the position of director at The Department of Health and Human Services' Office of Health Reform.

Lambrew has been a leading health expert alternately in academic and government. Her research interests include the uninsured, long-term care, Medicaid and Medicare. From 1997 to 2001, she helped analyze health issues and develop proposals as a program associate director at the Office of Management and Budget and as the senior health analyst at the National Economic Council.

Beginning as an assistant professor at Georgetown University, Lambrew moved to the Department of Health and Human Services during the 1993–94 push for health care legislation, then went on to coordinate budget proposal analysis in 1995. She later worked at the George Washington School of Public Health and Health Services as an associate professor. She moved to the Lyndon Johnson School of Public Affairs at the University of Texas, where she was an associate professor of public affairs. She has also served as a senior fellow at Center for American Progress, and she cowrote a book, Critical: What We Can Do About the Healthcare Crisis, with former Senate Majority Leader Tom Daschle.

At a December 11, 2008, press conference, President-elect Barack Obama announced that Lambrew would serve as deputy director of a newly created White House Office of Health Care Reform under Tom Daschle, who was also designated to serve as Secretary of Health and Human Services. Due to Tom Daschle withdrawing from both positions over tax issues, Nancy-Ann Min DeParle was appointed director. Under an executive order on April 11, 2009, Lambrew was subsequently appointed the director of the U.S. Department of Health and Human Services' Office of Health Reform, led by Kathleen Sebelius. The Department's Office of Health Reform will work closely with the White House Office of Health Reform, headed by Nancy-Ann DeParle.

Lambrew served as Commissioner of the Maine Department of Health and Human Services from 2019 to 2024.
