= Shuwanza Goff =

American political advisor

White House Director of Legislative Affairs
- In office August 1, 2023 – January 20, 2025
- President: Joe Biden
- Preceded by: Louisa Terrell
- Succeeded by: James Braid

Personal details
- Born: Shuwanza Rebecca Goff; 1983 or 1984 (age 41–42) New York City, New York, U.S.
- Party: Democratic
- Education: University of Tennessee (BA); American University (MS)

Shuwanza Rebecca Goff (born 1983/1984) is an American political advisor who served as the director of the White House Office of Legislative Affairs from 2023 to 2025, under Joe Biden. In January 2019, she was named floor director for legislative operations for Majority Leader Steny Hoyer, making her the first African-American woman to serve as floor director.

== Early life and education ==
Shuwanza Goff lived in New York City, alongside her sister April, as a child. Her parents are Robert and Hershular Smith-Goff. In the 1990s, the family moved to Mechanicsville, Virginia. Goff attended a private school in Richmond, Virginia.

Goff became interested in politics at a young age. When Goff was young, her parents used to take her and her sister with them when they would vote on Election Day. They would let Goff pull the voting machine lever to submit their votes. The family talked about politics regularly at dinner. When David Dinkins lost to Rudy Giuliani in New York City's 1993 mayoral race, Goff wrote a letter to Dinkins expressing her frustration. Hillary Clinton visited Goff's school when Goff was in the fourth grade. The fourth graders did not get to see Clinton. Goff held a protest about the fact her fourth grade class did not participate in Clinton's visit.

Goff decided to attend the University of Tennessee after a student at the university spoke to Goff's class in high school. Goff earned her bachelor's degree in political science in 2006. She earned her Master of Arts degree in justice, law, and society from American University in 2008. She served as an intern on Capitol Hill.

== Career ==
In 2008, Goff joined Steny Hoyer's office as staff assistant with the intention to leave the position at the end of the congressional cycle. However, by 2012 she was serving as Hoyer's deputy director of legislative operations.

In January 2019, Goff was named floor director for legislative operations for Hoyer. Goff was the first African American woman to serve as floor director. In this position, Goff communicated across party lines, negotiated on behalf of the Democrats, prepared the agenda and schedule for bills, which allowed for wider coordination between Congress, the Senate, and the White House.

Goff was named deputy director of the White House Office of Legislative Affairs as the liaison for House affairs for the Biden administration in November 2020, alongside Reema Dodin as deputy director and liaison for Senate affairs. She briefly stepped down from OLA in late February 2023 to become a principal at Cornerstone Government Affairs. In July 2023, it was announced that Goff was named the Director of the White House Office of Legislative affairs following the former director, Louisa Terrell, who is stepping down from the position at the end of that month.

== Personal life ==
Goff lives in northern Virginia.

Political offices
Preceded by Louisa Terrell	White House Director of Legislative Affairs; 2023–2025	Succeeded by James Braid
