= Wilton Persons =

American military officer and White House Chief of Staff

Jerry Persons

3rd White House Chief of Staff
- In office October 7, 1958 – January 20, 1961
- President: Dwight D. Eisenhower
- Preceded by: Sherman Adams
- Succeeded by: Kenneth O'Donnell (Appointments Secretary)

White House Director of Legislative Affairs
- In office January 20, 1953 – October 7, 1958
- President: Dwight D. Eisenhower
- Preceded by: Position established
- Succeeded by: Bryce Harlow

Personal details
- Born: Wilton Burton Persons; January 19, 1896 Montgomery, Alabama, U.S.
- Died: September 5, 1977 (aged 81) Fort Lauderdale, Florida, U.S.
- Party: Republican
- Relatives: Gordon Persons (brother)
- Education: Auburn University (BS); Harvard University (MBA)

Military service
- Allegiance: United States
- Branch/service: United States Army
- Years of service: 1917–1949; 1951–1952
- Rank: Major General
- Battles/wars: World War I World War II
- Awards: Legion of Merit; Army Distinguished Service Medal; Grand Officer of the Cross of the Sun (Brazil); Medal of War (Brazil); Order of Abdon Calderón (Ecuador)

Wilton Burton "Jerry" Persons (January 19, 1896 – September 5, 1977) was an American military officer who served as the White House Chief of Staff to President Dwight D. Eisenhower from October 7, 1958, until January 20, 1961.

A 1916 graduate Alabama Polytechnic Institute, Persons served in World War I and World War II. He was Chief of the legislative division in the Office of the Chief of Staff of the United States Army from 1942 to 1948, and the office of legislative liaison for the Department of Defense from 1948 to 1949. In 1951 he was called back to active duty as a special assistant to General Dwight D. Eisenhower at Supreme Headquarters Allied Powers in Europe. He became a deputy assistant to Eisenhower in 1953, assistant to the president in 1958, and chief of staff later that year.

== Early life ==
Wilton Burton Persons was born in Montgomery, Alabama, on January 10, 1896, one of five brothers. Persons was nicknamed "Jerry". He was educated at Starke University School in Montgomery, and Alabama Polytechnic Institute, where he studied electrical engineering, and from which he graduated in 1916. He then went to work for the Western Electric Company in Lynn, Massachusetts.

== World War I ==
Persons volunteered for service in World War I, but was initially rejected because he only weighed 129 pounds (59 kg), four pounds below the minimum acceptable weight. However, as an honor graduate, he was commissioned into the Coast Artillery Corps, and served with the American Expeditionary Forces in France in the Signal Corps.

== Between the wars ==
After the war Persons remained in the Army as a professor of military science and tactics at the University of Minnesota from 1924 to 1929. He graduated from Harvard University with a Master of Business Administration in 1931. He met Major Dwight D. Eisenhower Dwight D. Eisenhower that year while on duty in the Office of the Secretary of War in Washington, D.C.

== World War II ==
After graduating from the United States Army Command and General Staff College in 1938, Persons served in the Office of the Chief of Staff as a liaison officer to Congress from 1939 to 1941. Although war was imminent, Congress was still reluctant to approve armament programs, especially for weapons that it regarded as "aggressive". He was able to secure funding for the secret work on radar by showing Congressmen the work being done by the Signal Corps at Fort Monmouth. A major triumph was persuading Congress to extend the Selective Training and Service Act of 1940, the first peacetime draft in the United States, which was ultimately passed by 203 votes to 202.

Persons was Chief of the legislative division in the Office of the Chief of Staff from 1942 to 1948. He was promoted to the rank of brigadier general in June 1942, by which time the country had entered World War II, and major general in November 1944. Eisenhower requested that Persons be assigned to his Supreme Headquarters Allied Expeditionary Force (SHAEF), but the request was turned down on the grounds that Persons was essential in Washington. For his services, Persons was awarded the Army Distinguished Service Medal.

== Post war ==
After the war Persons headed the office of legislative liaison for the Department of Defense between 1948 and his retirement in 1949 with the rank of major general. For his services, he was awarded the Legion of Merit. Awards from other countries included the Grand Officer of the Cross of the Sun and the Medal of War from Brazil, Order of Abdon Calderon from Ecuador. He was superintendent of Staunton Military Academy from 1949 to 1950.

Persons was recalled to active duty as a special assistant to Eisenhower at Supreme Headquarters Allied Powers in Europe from 1951 to 1952. He retired from the Army for a second time in 1952, to work on Eisenhower's presidential campaign. He became a deputy assistant to the president on January 20, 1953, and then was made an assistant to the president in 1958. He handled congressional liaison until he replaced Sherman Adams as Eisenhower's chief of staff on October 7, 1958.

Following the 1960 presidential election, Persons was heavily involved as Eisenhower's representative in the transition of government between the Eisenhower and John F. Kennedy administrations. He met frequently with Clark Clifford, President-elect Kennedy's transition representative, to work out the details for a smooth transfer of government. He remained chief of staff until January 20, 1961. He then became director of the Graham‐Dex Preparatory School in Palm Beach, Florida.

Persons's brother Gordon Persons was Governor of Alabama from 1951 to 1955, and his son Wilton B. Persons Jr. was Judge Advocate General of the United States Army from 1975 to 1979.

Persons died in Fort Lauderdale, Florida, on September 5, 1977, and was buried in Arlington National Cemetery. His papers are in the Dwight D. Eisenhower Presidential Library in Abilene, Kansas.

== Notes ==
Political offices
New office	White House Director of Legislative Affairs; 1953–1958	Succeeded by Bryce Harlow
Preceded by Sherman Adams	White House Chief of Staff; 1958–1961	Succeeded by Kenneth O'Donnell as White House Appointments Secretary
