= Jason Miller (government official) =

American government official

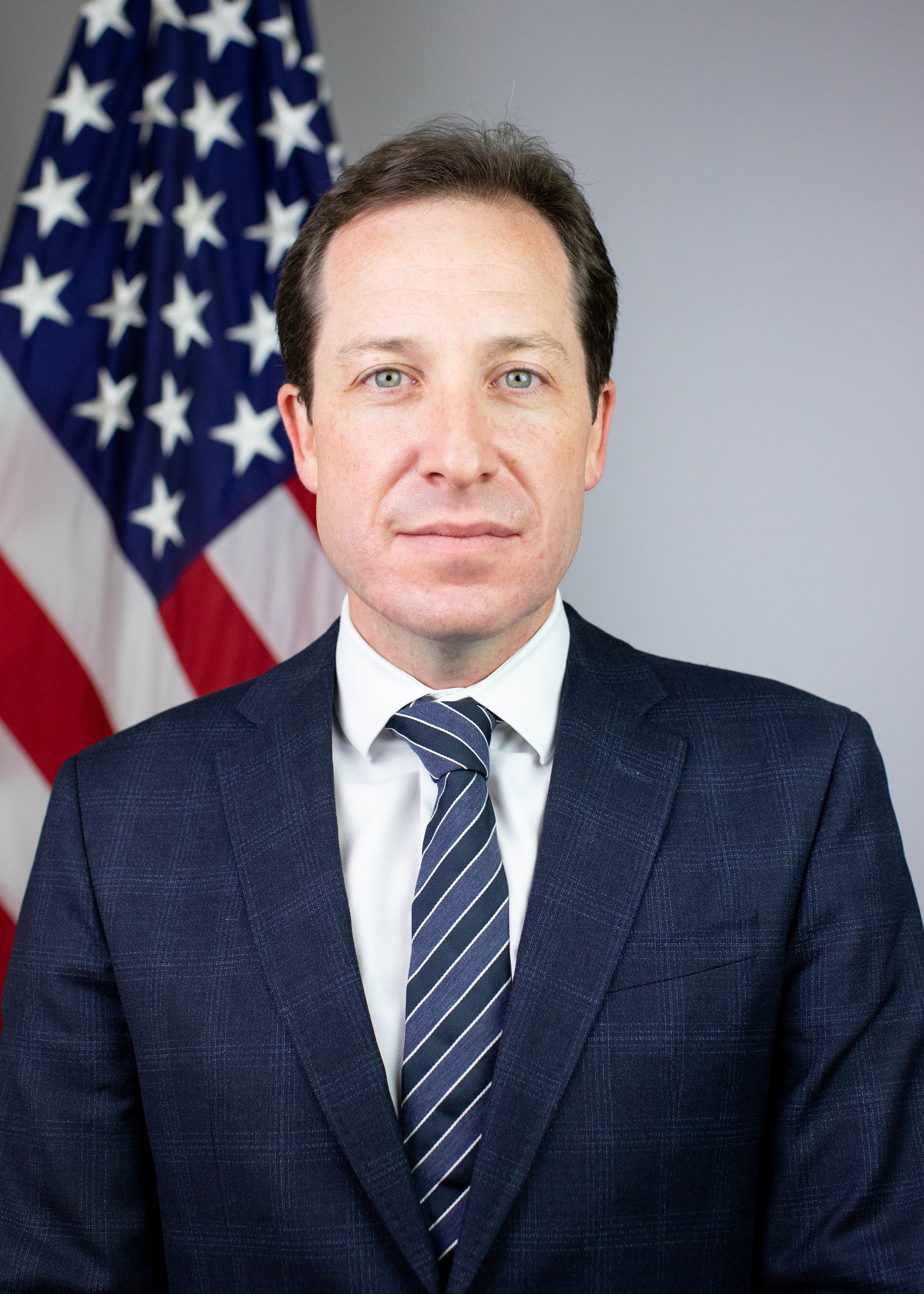

Chief Performance Officer of the United States
- In office April 28, 2021 – January 20, 2025
- President: Joe Biden
- Preceded by: Beth Cobert (2015)
- Succeeded by: Eric Ueland

Deputy Director of the Office of Management and Budget for Management
- In office April 28, 2021 – January 20, 2025
- President: Joe Biden
- Preceded by: Margaret Weichert
- Succeeded by: Eric Ueland

Personal details
- Party: Democratic
- Education: University of Pennsylvania (BA); Northwestern University (MBA); Harvard University (MPA)

Jason Scott Miller is an American businessman who served as Chief Performance Officer of the United States and deputy director of the Office of Management and Budget for management from 2021 to 2025.

== Education ==
Miller completed a BA at the University of Pennsylvania, an MBA at the Northwestern Kellogg, and an MPA at Harvard University.

== Career ==
Miller served in the Obama administration as deputy assistant to the president and deputy director of the National Economic Council, where he focused on economic development, manufacturing, infrastructure, tax policy, and energy. Before entering government he was a management consultant with the Boston Consulting Group and Marakon Associates.
