= Amy Swonger =

American political advisor (born 1974)

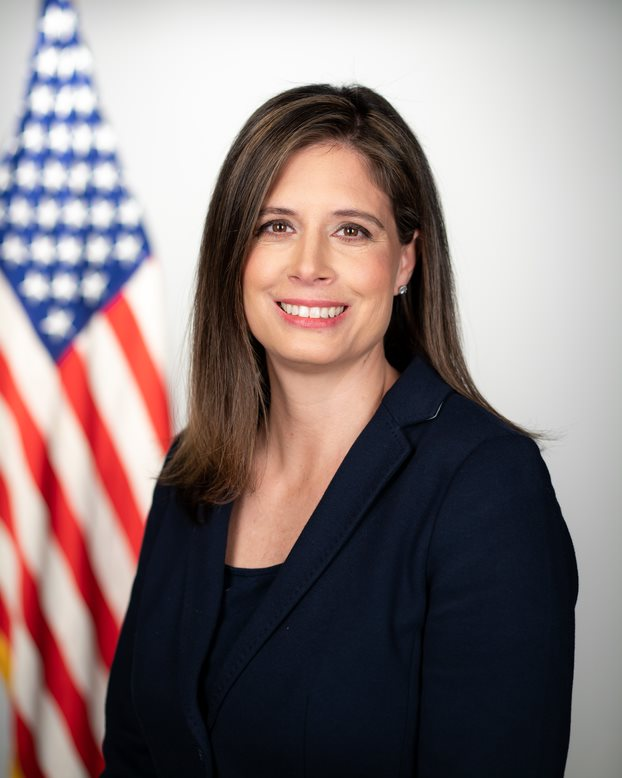

White House Director of Legislative Affairs
- In office June 5, 2020 – January 20, 2021
- President: Donald Trump
- Preceded by: Eric Ueland
- Succeeded by: Louisa Terrell

Personal details
- Born: August 28, 1974 (age 52)
- Party: Republican
- Education: University of North Carolina at Chapel Hill (BA)

Amy W. Swonger (born August 28, 1974) is an American political advisor and lobbyist who served as White House director of legislative affairs. Swonger was appointed to the position after Eric Ueland, the previous director, was named a senior advisor at the United States Department of State.

== Education ==
Swonger earned a Bachelor of Arts degree from the University of North Carolina at Chapel Hill.

== Career ==
After college, Swonger worked as a legislative aide in the United States House of Representatives. She later worked in the Senate offices of Mitch McConnell and Trent Lott. Swonger left government service to work as a lobbyist and government relations advisor at Ernst & Young and Heather Podesta + Partners. Swonger served as Deputy Assistant for Legislative Affairs in the office of Vice President of Dick Cheney. She then served as a Whip Liaison in the office of then-Senate Majority Whip Trent Lott. In March 2017, Swonger was named Deputy Assistant to the President for Legislative Affairs and deputy director of Legislative Affairs. Swonger was appointed to serve as director on June 5, 2020.
