= Amy Rosenbaum =

US academic and government official

White House Director of Legislative Affairs
- In office February 13, 2016 – January 20, 2017
- President: Barack Obama
- Preceded by: Katie Beirne Fallon
- Succeeded by: Marc Short

Personal details
- Party: Democratic
- Education: Cornell University (BA); Johns Hopkins University (MA, PhD)

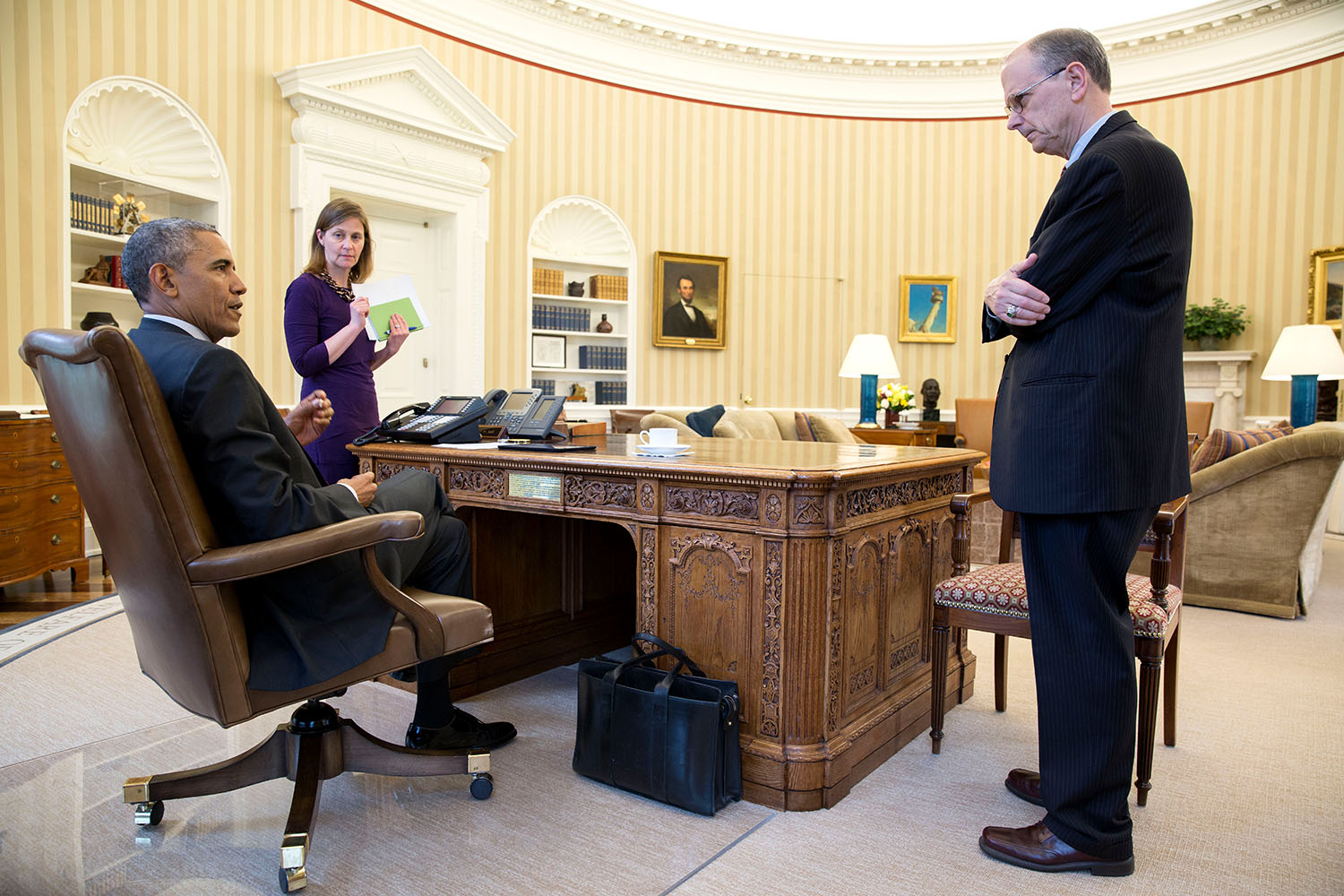
Barack Obama talks with Amy Rosenbaum

Amy Rosenbaum is a former government official from the Obama administration as director of legislative affairs, and was policy director for Nancy Pelosi. She left government work in 2010 and returned in 2014. She is now an adjunct professor at Harvard University's Kennedy School of Government and a fellow at the Center for American Progress. She has a B.A. from Cornell University and a PhD from Johns Hopkins University.
