= Max Friedersdorf =

American bureaucrat (1929–2020)

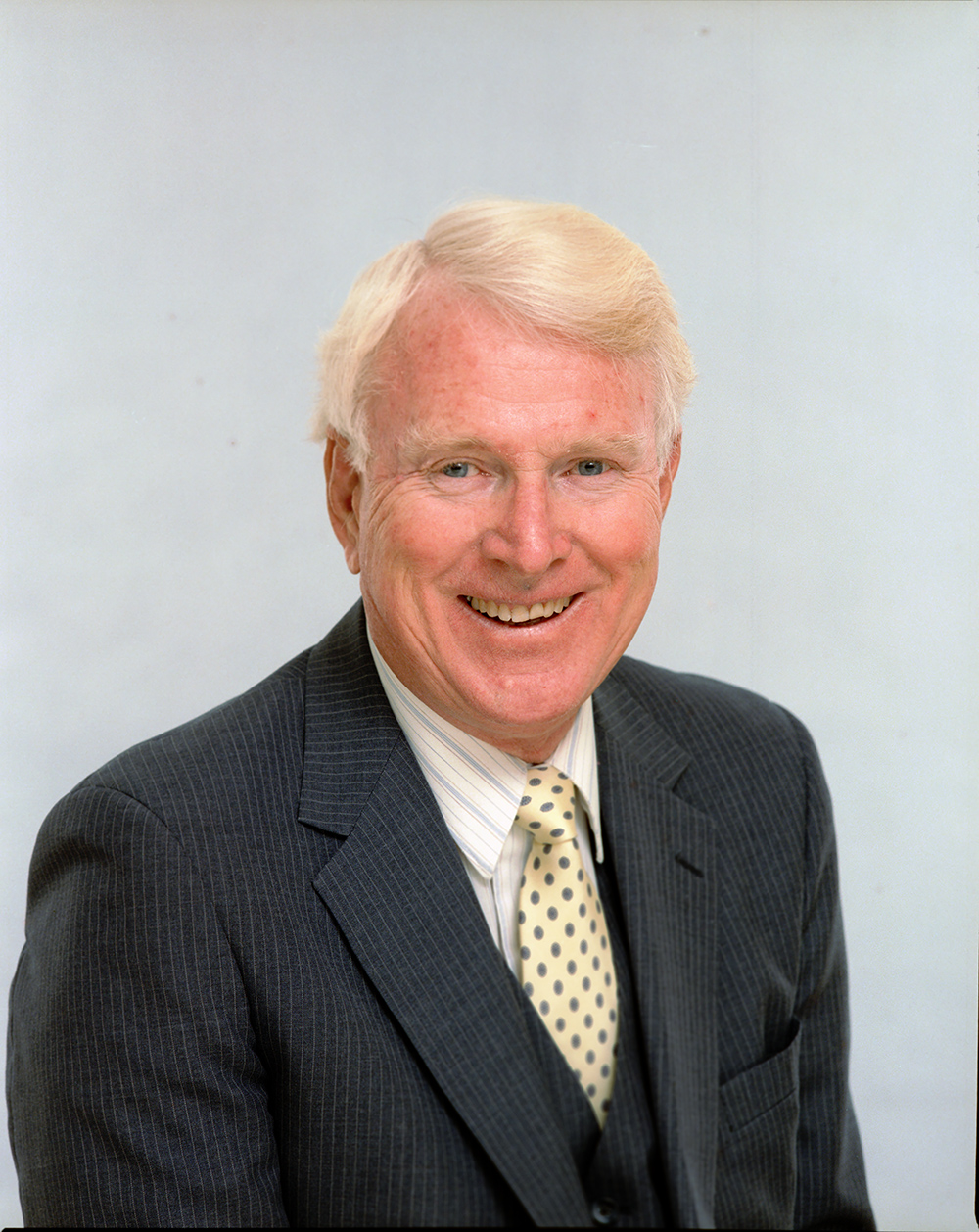
- Official portrait, 1987

White House Director of Legislative Affairs
- In office January 20, 1981 – January 2, 1982
- President: Ronald Reagan
- Preceded by: Frank Moore
- Succeeded by: Kenneth Duberstein
- In office December 31, 1974 – January 20, 1977
- President: Gerald Ford
- Preceded by: Bill Timmons
- Succeeded by: Frank Moore

Personal details
- Born: Max Lee Friedersdorf; July 7, 1929 Grammer, Indiana, U.S.
- Died: May 31, 2020 (aged 90) Fort Lauderdale, Florida, U.S.
- Party: Republican
- Education: New Mexico State University (attended); Franklin College (BA) American University (MA)

Max Lee Friedersdorf (July 7, 1929 – May 31, 2020) was an American federal administrative bureaucrat, reporter, diplomatic ambassador, and corporate president serving as deputy assistant, secretary in the Presidential administrations of Richard Nixon, Gerald Ford, Ronald Reagan and Jimmy Carter.

== Early life, education and journalism career ==
Friedersdorf attended New Mexico State University, graduated with BA in journalism Franklin College and with an MA in communications from American University. He became a city editor at the Franklin Evening Star, and later a reporter for the Louisville Times, the Chicago Daily News and the Indianapolis News, often covering politics.

== Political career ==
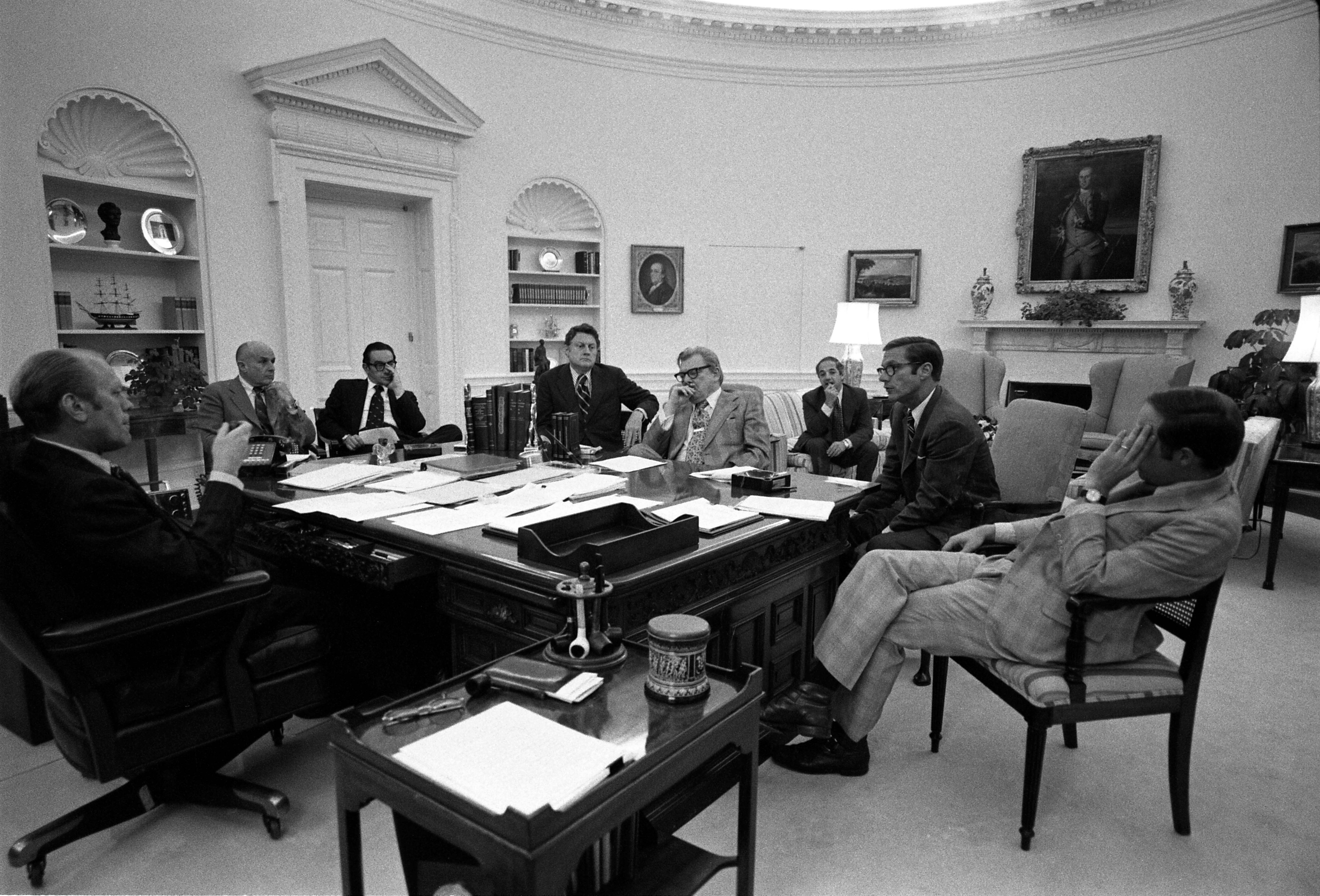
Friedersdorf (third from left) meets with President Gerald R. Ford and other advisers in the Oval Office to discuss the financial situation in New York City.

From 1961 to 1970 Friedersdorf served as administrative assistant and press secretary to Congressman Richard L. Roudebush. In 1970, he was the Office of Economic Opportunity Director of Congressional Relations. From 1971 to 1974, Friedersdorf served as Deputy Assistant for Congressional Affairs in the Nixon administration. After Nixon's resignation, Friedersdorf continued as Deputy Assistant to President Ford until 1975, eventually became the President's Assistant for Legislative Affairs. Friedersdorf served as Staff Director of the Senate Republican Policy Committee from January 1977 until his appointment as Chair of the Federal Election Commission in February 1979. He left the Commission on December 16, 1980, to accept the position of Special Assistant for Legislative Affairs to President-elect Reagan from 1980 to 1982, . He also served as consul to Bermuda and as ambassador to the Conference on Disarmament.

=== Reagan assassination attempt ===
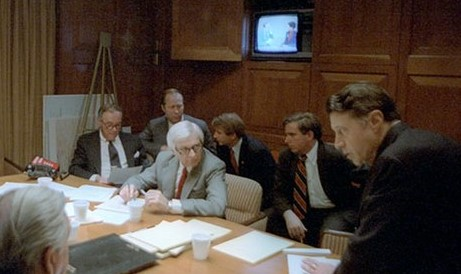
3/30/1981 Friedersdorf meets with Caspar Weinberger Don Regan Fred F. Fielding Helene Von Damm Drew Lewis Alexander Haig David Gergen Larry Speakes and Richard Darman in the Situation Room to discuss the attempted assassination of Ronald Reagan

Main article: Attempted assassination of Ronald Reagan

On March 30, 1981, President Reagan and others were wounded in an attempted assassination by John Hinkley. Friedersdorf was summoned to the George Washington University Hospital to assist with security at Reagan's room, and to provide support for Nancy Reagan.

Friedersdorf later stated that he expected the Reagan tax package to have the momentum to move forward, without undue influence of sympathy due to the incident. It passed as the Economic Recovery Tax Act of 1981.

== Corporate service ==
In 1983, Friedersdorf became vice president of public affairs at PepsiCo

== Personal life and death ==
Friedersdorf married Priscilla Marion Jones and they had two children. Friedersdorf died on May 31, 2020, of respiratory failure.

Political offices
Preceded by Bill Timmons	White House Director of Legislative Affairs; 1974–1977	Succeeded by Frank Moore
Preceded by Frank Moore	White House Director of Legislative Affairs; 1981–1982	Succeeded by Kenneth Duberstein
