= Demand Justice =

American progressive legal advocacy organization

- Formation: 2018
- Founders: Brian Fallon; Christopher Kang
- Type: 501(c)(4) nonprofit
- Headquarters: Washington, D.C.
- President: Josh Orton
- Budget: $11.7 million (2022)
- Website: demandjustice.org

Demand Justice is an American 501(c)(4) legal advocacy organization focused on the composition of the federal judiciary. It works to motivate left-leaning voters around judicial nominations, to press the Senate to confirm progressive nominees to judicial positions, and to expand the Supreme Court. Since 2025, it has been led by president Josh Orton, a former senior advisor to Vice President Kamala Harris and Senator Bernie Sanders.

The organization was established in 2018 by Brian Fallon and Christopher Kang and became known for its opposition to President Donald Trump's first-term judicial nominees, including Supreme Court Justice Brett Kavanaugh. It campaigned for greater professional diversity on the federal bench during Joe Biden's presidency and called for the appointment of public defenders and civil rights attorneys over corporate law firm partners to judicial spots. Axios described Demand Justice as the "tip of the progressive spear in battles over the makeup of the federal judiciary" during this period.

Under Orton, Demand Justice has opposed judicial nominations made during the second Trump administration since 2025, with a particular focus on nominees who have declined to acknowledge that Joe Biden won the 2020 presidential election or who have refused to characterize the events of January 6 as an attack. The group has also made an economic case against Trump's judicial appointments, arguing that they enable corporate consolidation and oligarchy. Its central work has been a preemptive campaign that it launched in April 2026 with the group Indivisible to oppose any Supreme Court nominee Trump might name before a vacancy happens, and Demand Justice has led meetings with allied organizations and elected officials in anticipation of the possibility.

== History ==
=== Founding and opposition to Trump's first-term nominees (2018–2020) ===
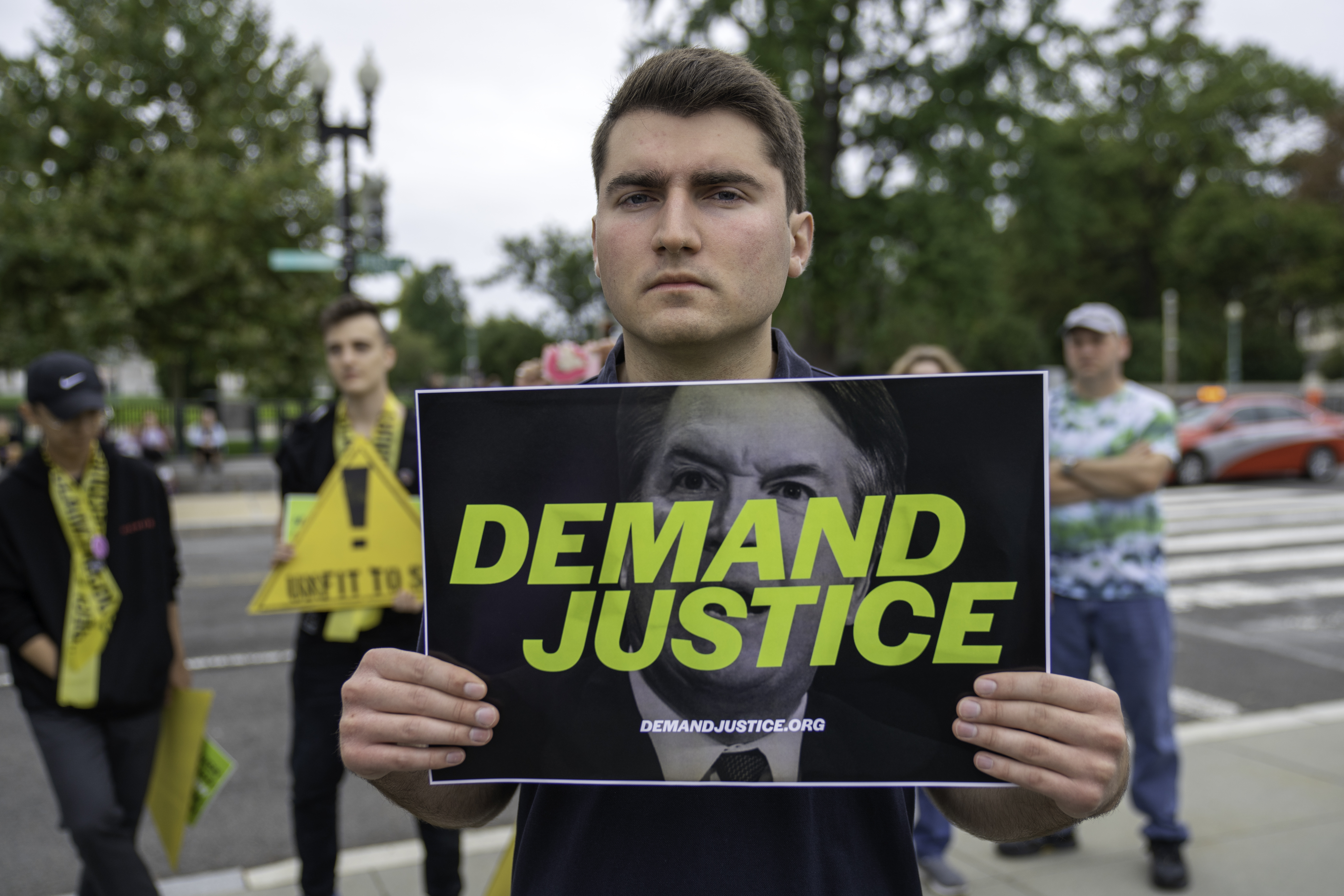
Demand Justice opposed Brett Kavanaugh's appointment to the Supreme Court and organized protests around his confirmation hearings.

Demand Justice was founded in 2018 and was first led by Brian Fallon, a press secretary for Hillary Clinton's 2016 presidential campaign, and Christopher Kang, who oversaw judicial nominations in the Obama administration. The group was started as a project of the Sixteen Thirty Fund and aimed to build progressive engagement around the federal judiciary.

Among its first major activities was extensive spending on television advertising opposing the confirmation of Brett Kavanaugh to the Supreme Court. During Kavanaugh's September 2018 confirmation hearings, the group organized protesters who dressed as handmaids, referencing The Handmaid's Tale, outside of where the hearings were taking place. The organization announced that it was spending $5 million on ads airing in Maine and Alaska to pressure Republican Senators Susan Collins and Lisa Murkowski about supporting an anti-choice nominee. They also announced plans to run ads targeting Democratic Senators Joe Manchin, Joe Donnelly, and Heidi Heitkamp to push them to oppose Kavanaugh.

The group ran similar campaigns against other first-term Trump nominees, including ads in 2018 opposing Amul Thapar, then reported to be on Trump's Supreme Court shortlist, and 2019 advertising through its affiliated 501(c)(3) organization, the Demand Justice Initiative, pressuring Senator Susan Collins over the nomination of Wendy Vitter.

In August 2019, Demand Justice's co-founders called on the next Democratic president to stop nominating corporate law firm partners to the federal bench, arguing that their predominance in those positions caused an imbalance that shaped the courts' treatment of people. In October 2019, it released a shortlist of potential Supreme Court nominees for a future Democratic president.

=== Activity during the Biden administration (2021–2024) ===
In May 2021, Demand Justice separated from the Sixteen Thirty Fund to become a standalone nonprofit organization. Fallon said the group had "outgrown the umbrella organization under which it operated for its first three years." Axios described the organization at the time as the "tip of the progressive spear in battles over the makeup of the federal judiciary."

Demand Justice pressed the incoming Biden administration to nominate lawyers from backgrounds historically underrepresented on the bench: public defenders, civil rights attorneys, and legal aid lawyers, rather than corporate law firm partners and prosecutors. In December 2020, incoming White House Counsel Dana Remus sent a letter to Democratic senators asking them to recommend such candidates for district court vacancies. Kang said the letter reflected "exactly the kind of priorities and processes that we have been pushing for." Demand Justice joined more than 30 progressive organizations in a letter asking senators to publicly commit to the approach.

Demand Justice ran a campaign in early 2021 called "Breyer Retire," which asked Justice Stephen Breyer to retire from the Supreme Court so that President Joe Biden could appoint a successor while Democrats controlled the Senate. The campaign included an online petition, digital advertising, and a billboard truck circling the Supreme Court. Jonathan Swan described Demand Justice as the most aggressive of the groups pressing Breyer to step down.

After Breyer announced his retirement and Biden nominated Ketanji Brown Jackson to succeed him, Demand Justice announced a $1 million advertising campaign supporting her confirmation. During Jackson's confirmation hearings, several Republican senators criticized Demand Justice's support for her.

In 2023, Fallon announced that he would step down as executive director, remaining on the group's board and as president of its political action committee. Kang also departed during this period. The group relaunched in 2025 under a new president, Josh Orton.

=== Relaunch under Josh Orton (2025–2026) ===
The organization named Josh Orton, a lawyer and Democratic strategist, as its president in September 2025. Orton had previously served as a senior advisor to Vice President Kamala Harris, as policy director for Bernie Sanders's 2020 presidential campaign, and as an aide to Senate Majority Leader Harry Reid and Senator Russ Feingold. Under Orton, the group began pressuring Democratic senators and Republican senators to oppose Trump's judicial nominees, and framed its opposition around the economic consequences of the courts, arguing that Trump's judicial appointments advanced the interests of large corporations and billionaires.

In October 2025, Demand Justice expanded a digital and billboard advertising campaign targeting Democratic members of the Senate Judiciary Committee, including Dick Durbin, Chris Coons, Sheldon Whitehouse, and Amy Klobuchar, who had all voted to advance Trump district court nominees. Orton said the group was prepared to expand the campaign to television if Democrats continued to support Trump's nominees.

Demand Justice released a report in November 2025 reviewing the questionnaire responses of 27 of Trump's second-term judicial nominees, arguing that none affirmatively stated that Biden had won the 2020 presidential election and that most had declined to characterize the January 6 United States Capitol attack as an attack. In December 2025, Demand Justice launched an advertising campaign targeting Senators John Fetterman, Maggie Hassan, and Angus King over their votes to confirm Trump judicial nominees. Demand Justice President Josh Orton called it an "opening salvo" and warned of a potential escalation against more vulnerable senators unless they "find their moral compass, to stand up to Trump."

Demand Justice released a statement criticizing Senators Dick Durbin, Chris Coons, and Sheldon Whitehouse for their votes in the Senate Judiciary Committee to advance the nomination of Sheria Clarke to the U.S. District Court for the District of South Carolina. Orton argued that Clarke had submitted "to a political litmus test from Trump to prove loyalty" and argued that "these three senators have chosen a delusion of normalcy over their obligation to their country, their constituents, their party, and the Constitution."

In April 2026, Demand Justice launched a preemptive campaign with the progressive group Indivisible to oppose any Supreme Court nominee Trump might put forward. Orton said the effort would begin at $3 million and expand by a further $15 million if a justice departed and Trump named a successor, framing the importance of the campaign around the argument that Trump could appoint a loyalist who could serve for decades to replace the court's two oldest members, Clarence Thomas and Samuel Alito. The campaign seeks to tie Republicans running in the 2026 elections to a potential Trump nominee.

Demand Justice has led closed-door meetings convening allied organizations and elected officials in anticipation of a vacancy. A meeting in 2026 included Senator Elizabeth Warren and Indivisible co-founder Ezra Levin. Participants discussed Trump's likely Supreme Court picks and how to oppose them.

== Finances ==
Demand Justice is organized as a 501(c)(4) social welfare organization, and its affiliated Demand Justice Initiative is organized as a 501(c)(3) charity. According to reporting on its tax filings, the two entities anticipated a combined budget of roughly $11.7 million in 2022.
