= Shahira Knight =

American lobbyist and economist

White House Director of Legislative Affairs
- In office July 20, 2018 – June 17, 2019
- President: Donald Trump
- Preceded by: Marc Short
- Succeeded by: Eric Ueland

Personal details
- Born: 1970 or 1971 (age 55–56)
- Party: Republican
- Spouse: Kelly Knight
- Education: University of Virginia (BA); George Mason University (MA)

Shahira Knight is an American economist and lobbyist. Knight served as director of legislative affairs for President Donald Trump from July 2018 to May 2019, and also acted as his economic policy advisor. During her tenure in the White House Office, she played a critical role in passing the Tax Cuts and Jobs Act of 2017.

== Education and career ==
Knight graduated from the University of Virginia and has an M.A. in economics from George Mason University. She worked on the House Ways and Means Committee and the Joint Economic Committee, including as a senior adviser to Chairman Bill Thomas. She then worked as a lobbyist for the Securities Industry and Financial Markets Association before becoming Vice President of Public Affairs and Policy at Fidelity Investments.

After the leaving the White House in summer of 2019, she joined Deloitte as Deputy Managing Principal of Policy and Government Relations, and became a 2020 Winter Fellow at the University of Chicago Institute of Politics.
