= Katie Beirne Fallon =

American political advisor

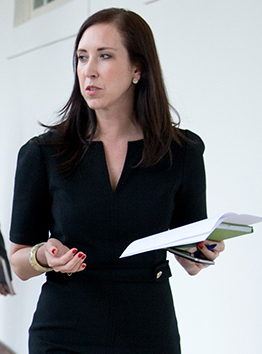

White House Director of Legislative Affairs
- In office January 1, 2014 – February 13, 2016
- President: Barack Obama
- Preceded by: Miguel Rodriguez
- Succeeded by: Amy Rosenbaum

Personal details
- Born: 1975 or 1976 (age 50–51) Cleveland, Ohio, U.S.
- Party: Democratic
- Spouse: Brian Fallon
- Education: University of Notre Dame (BA); London School of Economics (MA); Queen's University Belfast (MA)

Katie Beirne Fallon is an American political advisor who served as the White House director of legislative affairs under President Barack Obama.

== Early life and education ==
Fallon was born and raised in Cleveland, Ohio. She graduated first in her class at Magnificat High School and graduated summa cum laude from the University of Notre Dame in 1998 with a degree in government and international studies. She then studied comparative politics at Queen's University, Belfast and the London School of Economics, both on a Marshall Scholarship.

== Career ==
Before Fallon started her career in politics, she worked in investment banking in New York City.

Fallon served as White House Deputy Communications Director, Staff Director of the Senate Democratic Policy & Communications Center, and Legislative Director to Democratic Senator Chuck Schumer.

Fallon resigned as Director of Legislative Affairs on February 13, 2016, and was succeeded by her former deputy, Amy Rosenbaum.

In November 2016, she was appointed senior vice president and global head of corporate affairs at Hilton Hotels.

In October 2020, it was announced that she was joining McDonald's as Chief Global Impact Officer.

In 2022, Fallon joined Fidelity Investments.

== Personal life ==
In 2012, she married Brian Edward Fallon Jr., whom she met at the DPCC, and who served as national press secretary to Hillary for America. They have twin boys and a girl.
