= Rob Nabors =

American government official (born 1971)

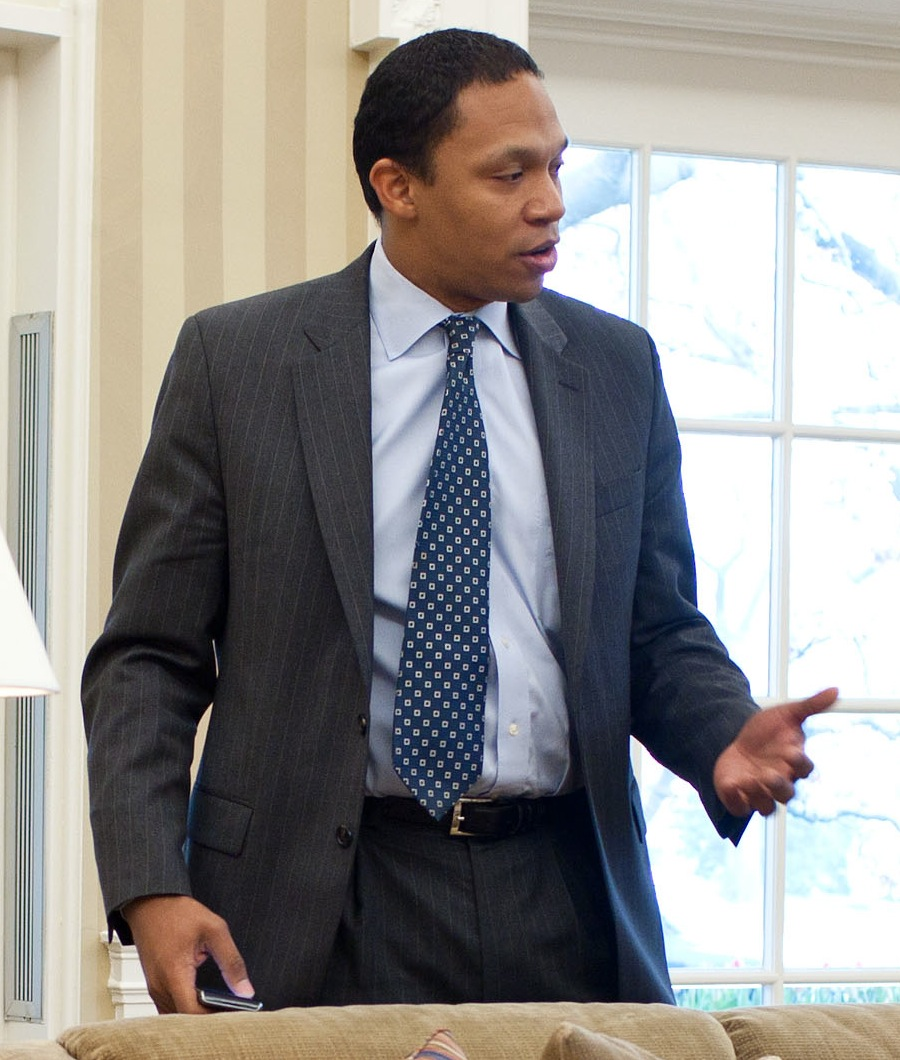

White House Deputy Chief of Staff for Policy
- In office January 25, 2013 – April 2, 2015
- President: Barack Obama
- Preceded by: Nancy-Ann DeParle
- Succeeded by: Kristie Canegallo (Policy Implementation)

White House Director of Legislative Affairs
- In office February 11, 2011 – January 25, 2013
- President: Barack Obama
- Preceded by: Phil Schiliro
- Succeeded by: Miguel Rodriguez

Personal details
- Born: Robert Lee Nabors II; March 27, 1971 (age 55) Fort Dix, New Jersey, U.S.
- Party: Democratic
- Education: University of Notre Dame (BA); University of North Carolina, Chapel Hill (MA)

Robert Lee Nabors II (/ˈneɪbərz/; born March 27, 1971) was the Chief of Staff of the U.S. Department of Veterans Affairs from 2014 to 2016. He previously served as White House Deputy Chief of Staff for Policy and several other senior roles in the Obama White House.

== Early life and education ==
He was born in Fort Dix, New Jersey and lived in Arizona, Maryland, Germany, Virginia, South Korea, Florida, Italy, Massachusetts in his youth. He received a B.A. from the University of Notre Dame in 1993 and an M.A. from the University of North Carolina-Chapel Hill in 1996.

== Clinton Administration ==
Nabors first joined the Office of Management and Budget, straight out of graduate school, as a program examiner in 1996. Assigned to the Bureau's commerce branch, he was given responsibility for the decennial census, and while he was working on that task, he was recognized as a "budding wunderkind" by OMB Director Jack Lew, who promoted him to special assistant to the director in 1998. In 2000, he was further promoted to assistant director for administration and executive secretary.

== Congressional staff ==
Nabors joined the minority staff of the powerful House Appropriations Committee at the end of the Clinton Administration. Appropriations Chair Dave Obey promoted him to minority staff director in 2004. When the Democrats won the House in 2006, Nabors became majority staff director. "'He was just the best man for the job,' says Appropriations Committee Chairman Dave Obey, 'and he understands the House, he understands the committee, he understands the town, he understands the bureaucracy, and he doesn’t take any crap from anybody. His demeanor is very nice and very cool, but he doesn’t take any crap from people.'" Nabors said it was his job not just to "recite" budget numbers but to "own the information" and understand the human meanings behind the numbers.

== Obama Administration ==
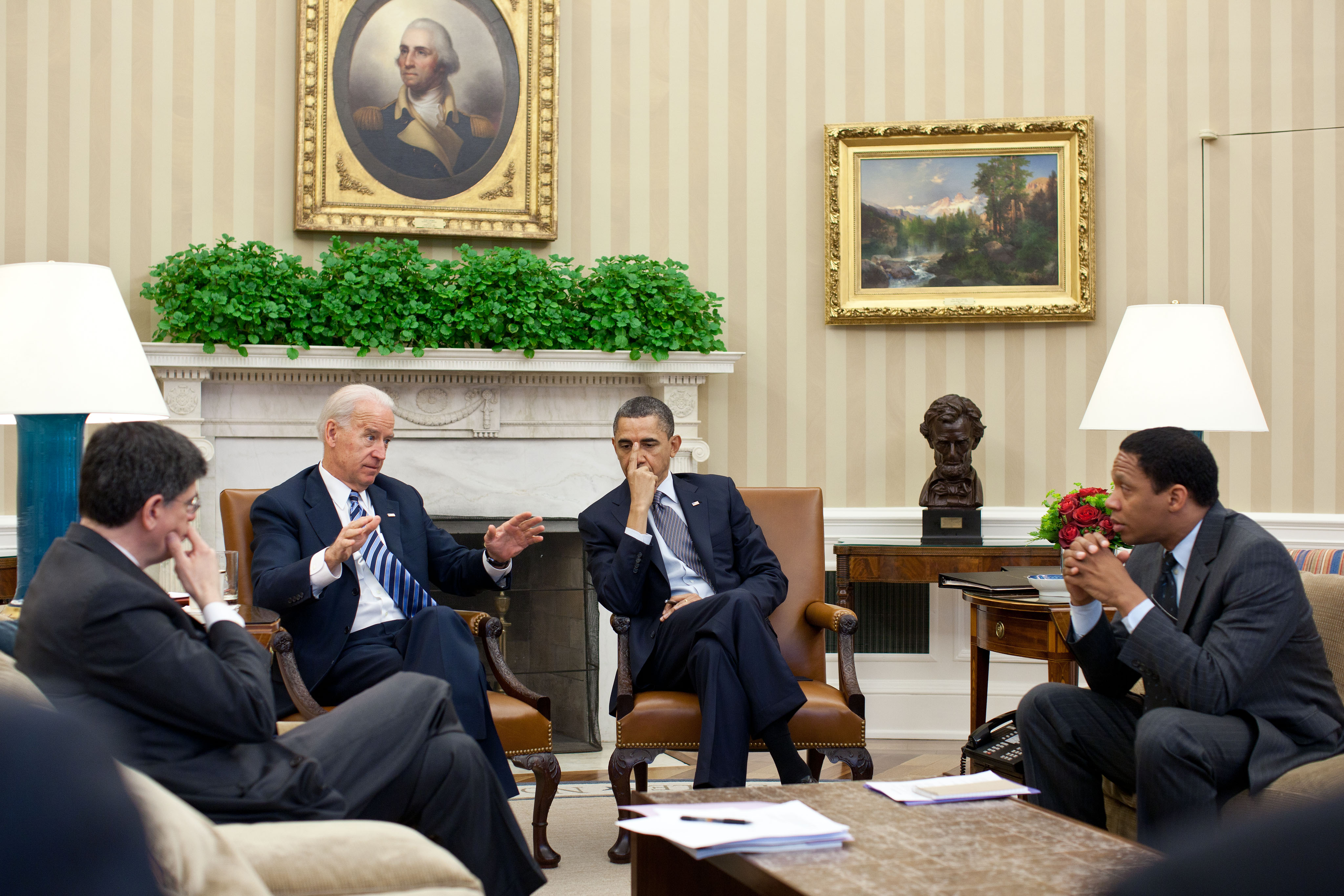
Nabors meeting with President Barack Obama, Vice President Joe Biden and the Office of Management and Budget Director Jack Lew, April 5, 2011

Nabors' selection as Deputy Director of OMB, along with the selection of Peter Orszag as Director of OMB, was announced by President-Elect Barack Obama on November 25, 2008.

In February 2010 Nabors became senior advisor to then-White House Chief of Staff Rahm Emanuel. Jeff Liebman replaced Nabors as Acting Deputy Director at OMB. In January 2011 it was announced that Nabors had succeeded Phil Schiliro as the head of the White House Office of Legislative Affairs. Nabors' tenure as Director of Legislative Affairs was characterized by difficult and contentious negotiations with the new Republican House Majority in the 112th Congress, most vividly on display in the debt-ceiling crisis of 2011. The stand-off eventually produced the compromise Budget Control Act of 2011, which resulted in the budget sequester in 2013.

In November 2011, Nabors was included on The New Republic's list of Washington's most powerful, least famous people.

At the start of President Obama's second term, Nabors was named White House Deputy Chief of Staff for Policy, alongside the new Chief of Staff Denis McDonough. In May 2014, in response to the Veterans Health Administration scandal, the President dispatched Nabors to oversee a review of practices at the Veterans Administration. Emails released by the House Committee on Veterans' Affairs show that Nabors pressured the IG to downplay the link between extended waiting times and veteran deaths.

On January 19, 2016, he became Director of Policy and Government Affairs covering the U.S., Canada and Asia Pacific at the Gates Foundation.

Political offices
Preceded by Nancy-Ann DeParle	White House Deputy Chief of Staff for Policy; 2013–2015	Succeeded by Kristie Canegallo
