= Louisa Terrell =

American lawyer (born 1969)

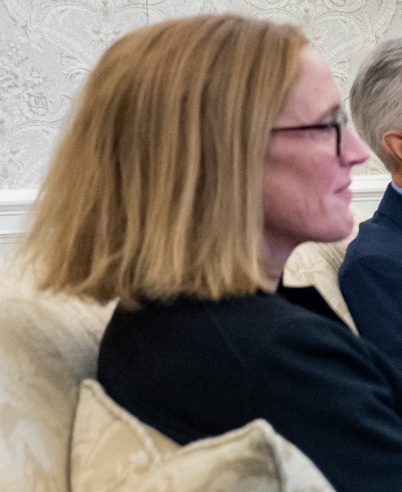

White House Director of Legislative Affairs
- In office January 20, 2021 – August 1, 2023
- President: Joe Biden
- Preceded by: Amy Swonger
- Succeeded by: Shuwanza Goff

Personal details
- Born: August 17, 1969 (age 57) Delaware, U.S.
- Party: Democratic
- Education: Tufts University (BA); Boston College (JD)

Louisa Terrell (born August 17, 1969) is an American lawyer and former government official. From 2021 to 2023, Terrell served as director of the White House Office of Legislative Affairs under President Joe Biden. Prior to this, Terrell served in a variety of government and private sector positions, including as a member of Biden's Senate staff and as a public policy director at Facebook.

== Early life and education ==
Terrell was born in Delaware on August 17, 1969. She received a Bachelor of Arts degree from Tufts University and a Juris Doctor degree from Boston College Law School.

Terrell has known President Joe Biden almost her entire life. She was a classmate of his son Beau Biden from kindergarten on. She has maintained this connection to the Bidens to the present day.

== Career ==
In 2001, she was on the Senate staff of Joe Biden. She was chief of staff for Cory Booker, and advisor to Tom Wheeler. She was a legislative aide to Barack Obama. She was director of federal policy and strategy, at Yahoo, public policy director at Facebook, and was deputy general counsel at McKinsey & Company. She was visiting faculty at the Biden Institute.

=== Biden Administration ===
Following Joe Biden's inauguration as President of the United States, Terrell was appointed director of the White House Office of Legislative Affairs. In 2021, she lobbied moderate Republicans and Democrats on the American Jobs Plan, which eventually passed the United States Senate in August 2021 as the Infrastructure Investment and Jobs Act.

Terrell, along with Shalanda Young and Steve Ricchetti, was tapped to lead the Democratic side in negotiations over the 2023 United States debt-ceiling crisis. She was due to depart at the end of July 2023.

=== Post Biden-Administration ===
Terrell serves as a managing director with Macro Advisory Partners, a company which provides businesses with strategic advice.

Political offices
Preceded by Amy Swonger	White House Director of Legislative Affairs; 2021–2023	Succeeded by Shuwanza Goff
