= Timmons & Company =

American lobbying firm based in Washington, D.C.

Timmons & Company is an American lobbying firm based in Washington, D.C. After William Timmons left the Ford White House in 1975, he founded this company along with Tom Korologos, who had reported to Timmons as Richard Nixon's White House legislative liaison.

== Business aspects ==
The company has been described as ranking among the twenty most lucrative lobbying firms, with reported earnings of around $65 million since the start of public disclosures in 1998. Also described as small but influential and bipartisan, it has founders and clients from both sides of the political spectrum, including company president Larry Harlow; a veteran of the Reagan and first Bush administrations, and company vice president Dan Shapiro, a senior policy advisor for the Obama campaign.

According to a 2007 article in Politico, Timmons and Company used a unique business model to build their small, but influential firm:

Timmons & Co. caps its client roster and bills them all the same fee – with quarterly payments due in advance. It shuns big-name recruits, such as former senators and governors. It has never had a foreign client, and it has always been bipartisan. And, unlike many big firms, Timmons does not assign lobbyists to specific client accounts. Rather, they all work for all of their clients.

== Political mention ==
In 2008, the Obama campaign referred to Timmons as "one of Washington’s most famous and powerful lobbyists" when Timmons was tapped for planning help by the McCain campaign. Time Magazine reported that Timmons's lobbying registrations "include work on a number of issues that have become flashpoints in the presidential campaign. He has registered to work on bills that deal with the regulations of troubled mortgage lenders Freddie Mac and Fannie Mae, a bill to provide farm subsidies, and bills that regulate domestic oil-drilling."

The Obama campaign hired Daniel Shapiro of this company as "senior adviser and Jewish outreach coordinator" in August 2008, after he "deregistered" as a lobbyist on August 11. Prior to his deregistration, he served Obama as an "unpaid advisor."
