= James Braid (political advisor) =

American legislative aide (born 1990)

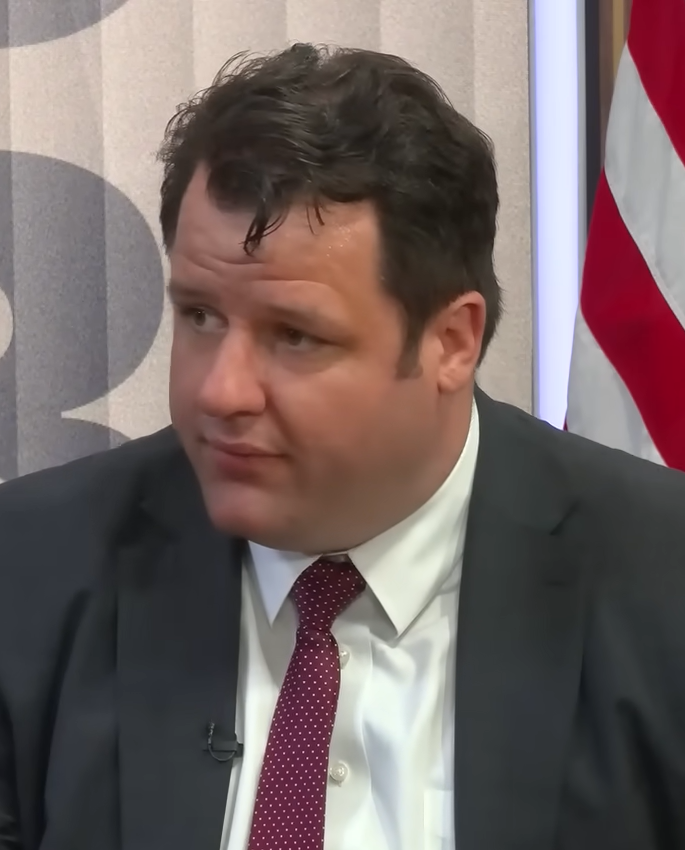
- Braid in 2025

White House Director of Legislative Affairs
- In office January 20, 2025 – October 13, 2026
- President: Donald Trump
- Preceded by: Shuwanza Goff
- Succeeded by: Katie Bailey

Personal details
- Born: November 21, 1990 (age 35) North Carolina, U.S.
- Party: Republican
- Spouse: Melissa Brown (m. 2022)
- Children: 2
- Education: University of Oklahoma (attended); University of North Carolina, Chapel Hill (BA)

James Braid (born November 21, 1990) is an American legislative aide who served as the White House director of legislative affairs from 2025 to 2026.

Braid graduated from the University of North Carolina, Chapel Hill, in 2013. After graduating, he worked for Heritage Action and The Washington Free Beacon. Braid served as the legislative director for South Carolina representative Mark Sanford and as the policy director of the Freedom Caucus. In July 2019, he became the deputy associate director for legislative affairs for appropriations at the Office of Management and Budget. In February 2023, he became Ohio senator JD Vance's legislative director.

In November 2024, President-elect Donald Trump named Braid as his White House director of legislative affairs. Braid was involved in negotiations over the One Big Beautiful Bill Act. In October 2026, he resigned as the director of legislative affairs.

== Early life and education (1990–2013) ==
James Braid was born on November 21, 1990, in North Carolina. Braid's father was an immigrant from Scotland. He initially attended the University of Oklahoma, but transferred to the University of North Carolina at Chapel Hill, where he played rugby and football. Braid graduated from the University of North Carolina in 2013. He is a Claremont Fellow.

== Career ==
=== Early work (2013–2019) ===
After graduating from the University of North Carolina, Chapel Hill, Braid reviewed books for The Washington Free Beacon while working for Heritage Action as an intern; he later became a staffer for Heritage Action. In October 2015, in his application for the Heritage Foundation's Young Leaders Program, Braid wrote that he was not a globalist on free trade, eliciting concern from some within the organization. Braid began working for South Carolina representative Mark Sanford. By January 2017, he had become Sanford's legislative director. That month, he was promoted as North Carolina representative Ted Budd's deputy chief of staff. By November 2018, Braid had become the policy director for the Freedom Caucus.

=== Office of Management and Budget and congressional aide (2019–2024) ===
In July 2019, Braid joined the Office of Management and Budget as the deputy associate director for legislative affairs for appropriations. In January 2021, months after president Donald Trump's loss to Joe Biden in the 2020 presidential election, he became the chief of staff to Montana representative Matt Rosendale. In July, he proposed to Melissa Brown, the communications director for the Freedom Caucus; they married in March 2022 and have two children. In November 2021, Braid became a government affairs fellow at the Conservative Partnership Institute. The following month, he became Colorado representative Ken Buck's chief of staff. In February 2023, Braid became Ohio senator JD Vance's legislative director. According to NOTUS, Vance sought out Braid directly.

As Vance's legislative director and deputy chief of staff, Braid developed several of his proposed bills, including the Rail Safety Act. According to The Washington Post, he bluntly told Oklahoma senator James Lankford that the Bipartisan Border Security Bill would not pass and that Republicans should not vote for it, an unusual act for a staffer. Luther Lowe, the head of public policy at Y Combinator, told the Post that Braid was a "pragmatist" who worked with Democrats on antitrust legislation to advance his own views on corporate accountability. In August 2024, ProPublica obtained a training video of Braid telling political appointees how to talk with congressional officials for Project 2025.

== White House Director of Legislative Affairs (2025–2026) ==
In November 2024, Bloomberg News reported that president-elect Donald Trump was set to name Braid as his White House director of legislative affairs. According to NOTUS, Vance advocated for Braid. A week later, Trump officially announced that Braid would serve as the director of legislative affairs. The following month, he participated in a meeting to pressure Freedom Caucus members to raise the debt ceiling. According to Punchbowl News and The Washington Post, the meeting became contentious, eventually leading to Braid and other staffers being kicked out of the room for advocating for Trump's position, rather than their own. Roll Call quoted several Republican sources in describing Braid as effective. His responsibilities were occasionally assumed by Trump, who spoke to lawmakers directly. Ahead of to Trump's imposition of his Liberation Day tariffs, Braid sought to assuage senators about their economic impact. He was involved in negotiations over the One Big Beautiful Bill Act.

In August 2026, Politico reported that Braid was set to leave his position as the White House director of legislative affairs. He left the position on October 13.

Political offices
Preceded by Shuwanza Goff	White House Director of Legislative Affairs; 2025–2026	Succeeded by Katie Bailey
