= United States–Japan Advisory Commission =

1983–84 advisory group

The United States–Japan Advisory Commission, also known as the Wise Men's Group, was a group that worked on bilateral economic, security, and political issues between the United States and Japan. The group met several times between 1983 and 1984 before submitting their final report to President Ronald Reagan and Prime Minister Yasuhiro Nakasone on September 17, 1984.
