= Nancy-Ann DeParle =

Former American Deputy Chief of Staff for Policy

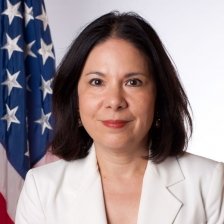

White House Deputy Chief of Staff for Policy
- In office January 27, 2011 – January 25, 2013
- President: Barack Obama
- Preceded by: Mona Sutphen
- Succeeded by: Rob Nabors

Director of the Office of Health Reform
- In office April 8, 2009 – January 27, 2011
- President: Barack Obama
- Preceded by: Position established
- Succeeded by: Position abolished

10th Administrator of the Centers for Medicare and Medicaid Services
- In office September 1997 – September 29, 2000; Acting: September 1997 – November 1997
- President: Bill Clinton
- Preceded by: Bruce Vladeck
- Succeeded by: Michael Hash (Acting)

Personal details
- Born: Nancy-Ann Min; December 17, 1956 (age 69) Cleveland, Ohio, U.S.
- Party: Democratic
- Education: University of Tennessee, Knoxville (BA); Balliol College, Oxford (BA); Harvard University (JD)

Nancy-Ann Min DeParle (born December 17, 1956) served as the Deputy Chief of Staff for Policy in the administration of President Obama from January 2011 to January 2013. Previously, she served as the director of the White House Office of Health Reform, leading the administration's efforts on health care issues, including the passing of the Patient Protection and Affordable Care Act. She served as the director of the Health Care Financing Administration (HCFA) from 1997 to 2000, administering the Medicare program for the Clinton administration, and before then worked at the Office of Management and Budget.

== Education and personal life ==
Nancy-Ann Min was born in Cleveland, Ohio, to a Chinese immigrant father and a Euro-American mother. Raised in Rockwood, Tennessee, she graduated from Rockwood High School. Her mother died of lung cancer when Nancy-Ann was 17.

She attended the University of Tennessee in Knoxville, where her major was history and her senior thesis was entitled "Uncle Sam, Hirohito, and Resegregation: The Tule Lake Segregation Center, 1943-1946." She was awarded a B.A. degree with highest honors and was elected to Phi Beta Kappa and selected as a Phi Kappa Phi scholar. She was the first female president of the University of Tennessee student body and was a member of the Gamma Alpha chapter of Delta Gamma. In 1978 Glamour magazine named her one of the year's top ten college women.

After graduating from Tennessee, she enrolled in Harvard Law School, but interrupted her studies there when she was awarded a Rhodes scholarship. As a Rhodes scholar, she went to Balliol College of Oxford University, receiving a B.A. from Oxford in 1981. After returning to Harvard, she earned a J.D. degree in 1983.

She is married to Jason DeParle, a reporter for The New York Times. They have two sons.

== Career ==
DeParle was a partner at the law firm of Bass, Berry & Sims in Nashville before serving as commissioner of the Tennessee Department of Human Services in the cabinet of Governor Ned McWherter from 1987 to 1989.

DeParle has also served as a trustee at the nonprofit Robert Wood Johnson Foundation, a research fellow at Harvard Kennedy School at Harvard University, and a fellow at the Wharton School of Business. She has also been a Commissioner on the Medicare Payment Advisory Commission (MedPAC). In November 2011, DeParle was included on The New Republic's list of Washington's most powerful, least famous people.

== Corporate connections ==
She served as a director of Accredo Health Inc., Boston Scientific, Cerner, DaVita Inc., Guidant, Medco Health Solutions, Speciality Laboratories, and Triad Hospitals. She was a managing director of CCMP Capital.

== See also ==
- List of czars of the Obama administration

Political offices
Preceded by Bruce Vladeck	Administrator of the Centers for Medicare and Medicaid Services; 1997–2000	Succeeded by Michael Hash; Acting
New office	Director of the Office of Health Reform; 2009–2011	Position abolished
Preceded by Mona Sutphen	White House Deputy Chief of Staff for Policy; 2011–2013	Succeeded by Rob Nabors
