= Phil Schiliro =

American political consultant and strategist

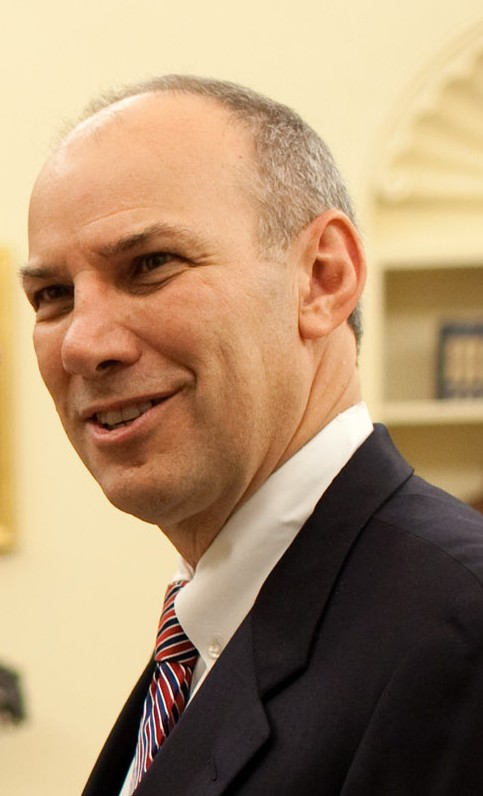

White House Director of Legislative Affairs
- In office January 20, 2009 – February 11, 2011
- President: Barack Obama
- Preceded by: Dan Meyer
- Succeeded by: Rob Nabors

Personal details
- Born: August 6, 1956 (age 70) New York City, New York, U.S.
- Party: Democratic
- Education: Hofstra University (BA); Lewis and Clark College (JD)

Philip M. Schiliro is an American political consultant and strategist. He has spent much of his career on the staff of prominent elected officials, including President Barack Obama.

Schiliro was born August 6, 1956, in Brooklyn, New York and grew up on Long Island.

Schiliro graduated from Hofstra University and Lewis & Clark Law School, where he was editor-in-chief of Environmental Law.

From the early 1980s until 2008, he served in a number of congressional staff positions, notably as Democratic Chief of Staff for the United States House Committee on Oversight and Government Reform and as chief of staff to Representative Henry Waxman. In 2004, he worked as policy director for Senate Democratic leader Tom Daschle.

In 1992 Schiliro ran unsuccessfully to represent New York's 4th District in Congress, narrowly losing a race to represent the newly redrawn Nassau County-based seat to Hempstead Town Councilman David A. Levy.

He held four different positions under President Obama. Before the President took office, Schiliro was director of congressional relations for Obama's presidential transition team. From 2009 to February 2011, he served as Assistant to the President and Director of Legislative Affairs. From February to December 2011 he was an Assistant to the President and Special Advisor. He left to become a private consultant. In December 2013 the White House announced that he was rejoining the President's staff on a short-term basis to work on health care issues. He stepped down in May 2014.

Since leaving government, Schiliro has been involved in several initiatives. He has co-founded Schiliro Barnett, a consulting firm; Co-Equal, a non-profit initiative aimed at strengthening Congress as a co-equal branch of government; and Grow New Mexico, a non-profit devoted to community development in that state. He holds an appointment as a senior presidential fellow at the Peter S. Kalikow Center for the Study of the American Presidency at Hofstra University.

He and his wife, Jody, have one daughter.
