= Democracy Initiative =

- Founded: 2012
- Headquarters: Virginia
- Website: www.democracyinitiative.virginia.edu

The Democracy Initiative is a progressive coalition formed in late 2012. The initiative had goals of restricting the unlimited monetary donations by corporations, from wealthy political campaigns, and from causes permitted by the United States Supreme Court. Other donations were allowed by the United States Supreme Court from a decision in Citizens United v. Federal Election Commission, supporting voters' rights, combating voter ID laws, and curbing aggressive use of the filibuster in the United States Senate.

== About ==
The coalition was formed as an invitation only meeting at National Education Association (NEA) headquarters, the Sierra Club, Greenpeace, the Communications Workers of America (CWA), and the NAACP.

Plans for the meeting originated in meetings between Phil Radford, Executive Director of Greenpeace US; Larry Cohen, President of the CWA; Ben Jealous, President of the NAACP; and Michael Brune, Executive Director of the Sierra Club. The issues selected represent shared interest in broad democratic political participation which would make advancement of the political agendas of the participating groups possible.

In addition to the convening organizations, the initial organizing meeting was attended by leaders of the League of Conservation Voters, Friends of the Earth, Public Campaign, the AFL–CIO, SEIU, Common Cause, Voto Latino, the Demos think tank, Piper Fund, Citizens for Responsibility and Ethics in Washington, People for the American Way, National People's Action, National Wildlife Federation, the Center for American Progress, the United Auto Workers, Color of Change, and others, including someone affiliated with Mother Jones.
