= 2005 nuclear option debate =

United States Senate debate

The 2005 debate on the nuclear option was a political debate in the United States Senate regarding the possible use of the nuclear option to allow a simple majority to confirm judicial nominees. At the time, three-fifths of all senators duly chosen and sworn (then 60 votes) were required to end debate on nominations under Rule XXII of the Senate's standing rules.

The debate was sparked when Majority Leader Bill Frist (Republican of Tennessee) threatened its use to end Democratic-led filibusters of judicial nominees submitted by President George W. Bush. In response to this threat, Democrats threatened to shut down the Senate and prevent consideration of all routine and legislative Senate business. The ultimate confrontation was prevented by the Gang of 14, a group of seven Democratic and seven Republican Senators, all of whom agreed to oppose the nuclear option and oppose filibusters of judicial nominees except in extraordinary circumstances.

== Judicial nominations leading up to 2005 ==
=== Clinton appointments: 1993–2000 ===
In 1995, Democrats held the White House. The New York Times editorialized, "The U.S. Senate likes to call itself the world's greatest deliberative body. In the last session of Congress, the Republican minority invoked an endless string of filibusters to frustrate the will of the majority. This (is a) relentless abuse of a time-honored Senate tradition ... Once a rarely used tactic reserved for issues on which Senators held passionate convictions, the filibuster has become the tool of the sore loser, dooming any measure that cannot command the 60 required votes." There was no attempt to rewrite Senate rules for cloture at that time.

In 1996, President Bill Clinton nominated Judge Richard Paez to the United States Court of Appeals for the Ninth Circuit. Republicans held up Paez's nomination for more than four years, culminating in a failed March 8, 2000 filibuster. Only 14 Republicans approved it. Senate Majority Leader Bill Frist (R-TN) was among those who voted to filibuster Paez. Paez was ultimately confirmed with a simple majority.

In addition to filibustering nominations, the Republican-controlled Senate refused to hold hearings for some 60 Clinton appointees, effectively blocking their nomination from coming to a vote on the Senate floor.

=== Bush appointments: 2001–04 ===
When George W. Bush took office in 2001 there remained dozens of federal court vacancies. Democratic Senators contended that these vacancies remained despite Clinton nominations to fill them because of obstruction by Republican Senators. Republicans held a majority in the Senate during the last six years of the Clinton administration and controlled who would be voted on. Democratic Senators asserted that, for the most part, Republicans did not raise objections to those judicial candidates, but simply refused to hold hearings on the nominations.

During his first term, President Bush nominated 46 people to federal appeals court seats, of which 36 were confirmed. Democrats blocked the confirmation of 10 nominees, on the grounds that they were too "out of the mainstream" for a lifetime appointment. At the beginning of his second term, Bush resubmitted seven of the 10 names. Senate Minority Leader Harry Reid (D-Nev.) vowed to fight their confirmation. Senate Majority Leader Frist threatened to use the nuclear option to get them confirmed.

=== Coining the term, 2003 ===
Senator Ted Stevens (R-Alaska) suggested using a ruling of the chair to defeat a filibuster of judicial nominees in February 2003. The code word for the plan was "Hulk". Weeks later, Sen. Trent Lott (R-Miss.) coined the term nuclear option in March 2003 because the maneuver was seen as a last resort with possibly major consequences for both sides. The metaphor of a nuclear strike refers to the majority party unilaterally imposing a change to the filibuster rule, which might provoke retaliation by the minority party.

== Lines are drawn ==
In the 2005 Senate, Republicans held 55 seats and the Democrats held 45 including Jim Jeffords, an independent from Vermont who caucused with the Democrats. Confirmation requires a plurality of votes, and the Republicans could easily confirm their nominees if brought to the floor. Earlier in 2005, Democrats had blocked the nomination of 10 of George W. Bush's nominees, saying they were too conservative and that Republicans had blocked many of their nominees back in the 1990s. Frist then threatened to use the nuclear option in response. Democrats warned that if Frist used the nuclear option they would shut down the Senate so that no business of any sort could be transacted.

=== "Extremist" judges ===
In March 2005, President Bush announced that the administration would no longer seek the American Bar Association's (ABA) evaluations of federal judicial candidates, responding to Republican complaints of liberal bias and ending a tradition started by Eisenhower in 1953. Despite this, the ABA's committee continues to provide the service. Democratic senators all favor the ABA input.

In April 2005, Senate Democrats were blocking the confirmation of seven of President Bush's nominees, calling them too extreme for a lifetime appointment. The most controversial nominees were Janice Rogers Brown and Priscilla Owen (both later confirmed).

== Nuclear option readied ==
Under pressure by the White House and social conservatives, Majority Leader Bill Frist signaled his readiness to pull the trigger on the 'nuclear option' to push through Bush's appellate court choices blocked by the Democrats' threat of filibuster.

Senate majority leader Bill Frist said that Owen ought to have the "courtesy of an up-or-down vote" and was reportedly deciding whether to use the "nuclear option". Senate minority leader Harry Reid wrote, in a letter to Frist, "But I want to be clear: we are prepared for a vote on the nuclear option."

Republican pollster Ayres, McHenry and Associates found that 82 percent of registered voters believe that "well-qualified" nominees should receive an up or down vote (which would have included all of the candidates except Janice Rogers Brown). An Associated Press-Ipsos poll released May 20, 2005, found 78 percent of Americans believe the Senate should take an "assertive role" examining judicial nominees rather than just give the president the benefit of the doubt. Democratic pollster Westhill Partners found that only 30 percent of Americans approve changing "the rules to require only 51 votes to end a filibuster – thereby eliminating the current system of checks and balances on the majority party."

=== Political motivations ===
Many Democrats viewed Frist's threats to push the nuclear option button to be more about his plan to run for president in 2008 than about the qualifications of the few nominees currently blocked in the Senate. Quoting from Slate.com:

Frist has made clear he will give up his Tennessee Senate seat in 2006, keeping his pledge to serve just two terms and leaving himself free to campaign for president. He has begun to court his party's conservative base.

Pat Robertson, founder of Christian Coalition of America, and several other prominent Christian conservatives endorsed the nuclear option as a necessary means of getting conservative judges onto the bench. In a May 1, 2005 interview on ABC's 'This Week with George Stephanopoulos', Pat Robertson said that Democratic judges are a greater threat to U.S. unity and stability than Al Qaeda, Nazi Germany or Civil War. On Sunday, April 25, 2005, Family Research Council sponsored "Justice Sunday" featuring Bill Frist – a 90-minute simulcast over Christian radio and television networks enthusiastically supporting the nuclear option. In January 2005, Dr. James C. Dobson, head of Focus on the Family, threatened six Democratic senators if they block conservative nominees. On May 24, 2005, after the compromise negotiated between 14 Senators was announced (the Gang of 14), Dobson said the agreement "represents a complete bailout and a betrayal by a cabal of Republicans and a great victory for united Democrats."

One of the arguments made by Senate Republicans opposed to the nuclear option was that Democrats might gain a Senate majority, or the Presidency, again. Thus the GOP might need the filibuster to block the appointment of what Republicans might consider to be an unacceptable nominee by the Democratic president.

Protests against the nuclear option took place on numerous college campuses; on the Princeton University campus, outside the Frist Campus Center (named for the senator's family) students staged a protest against the nuclear option by simulating a filibuster for two weeks non-stop, beginning on April 26, 2005.

== Democratic opposition ==
=== Obstruction or a "power grab" ===
In response to claims of "Senate obstructionism," Senate Minority Leader Harry Reid (D-Nev) pointed out that only 10 of 214 nominations by President Bush have been turned down. Former President Bill Clinton called Republican efforts to paint Democrats as obstructionist "a hoax" stating "The Republicans wouldn't even give a vote to 40 of my Court of Appeals judges... never mind all the others that they wouldn't have voted." One of Democrats' biggest complaints had been that more than 60 of President Clinton's nominees were bottled up in committee, leaving positions available for Bush to fill. (Republicans were the majority in the Senate for six of Clinton's eight years as President—1995–2001.) On April 27, 2005, Former Vice President Al Gore said, "Their grand design is an all-powerful executive using a weakened legislature to fashion a compliant judiciary in its own image. ... What is involved here is a power grab."

=== Democratic proposal ===
On May 9, 2005, Senate Democratic leader Harry Reid offered the Democrats' support for one of President Bush's judicial nominees, former Senate lawyer Thomas B. Griffith. Democrats cited this offer as a goodwill gesture to show that they are willing to cooperate with Republicans and confirm "acceptable" nominees. Reid stated that Democrats "will only block unacceptable nominees" (such as Brown and Owen), but would confirm Griffith, saying "Let's take a step away from the precipice. Let's try cooperation, rather than confrontation."

Republican spokesman Bob Stevenson rejected the offer, saying, "Why stop at one? We should take them all up." Republicans contended that the Democrats' offer was empty, since the Democrats would have retained the discretion to block any of President Bush's future nominees that they deemed "extremist", even when those nominees enjoyed the support of all Republican Senators. Thus, that Reid's offer did not resolve the problems that led to consideration of the nuclear option in the first place. Republicans also noted that the Democrats' judicial filibusters had already killed three of President Bush's Court of Appeals nominations (Miguel Estrada, Charles Pickering, and Carolyn Kuhl), as those judges withdrew their nominations rather than continue to fight the filibuster.

=== Republican counter-proposal ===
Senate Majority Leader Bill Frist (R-Tenn) floated a Republican counter-offer. In exchange for ending the filibuster against judicial nominees, the Republicans offered to end the practice of bottling up appellate-court nominees in committee (a nod to President Clinton's nominees who were denied floor votes), and to guarantee up to 100 hours of debate on each nomination. Minority Leader Reid rejected that offer calling it, "a big wet kiss to the far right".

=== Critical mass ===
On Friday, May 20, 2005, a cloture vote for the nomination of Janice Rogers Brown was rescheduled for Tuesday, May 24. The failure of this cloture vote would be the beginning of the nuclear option, immediately followed by the asking for the ruling of the chair on the constitutionality of the filibuster. On May 23, Majority Leader Frist called for a vote on Priscilla Owen. This threatened to trigger the nuclear option.

== Gang of 14 ==
Senator John McCain (R-AZ) and Senator Ben Nelson (D-NE) reached out to a number of colleagues on both sides to compromise by winning confirmation of some of the disputed nominees (Janice Rogers Brown, William Pryor, and Priscilla Owen) while preserving the judicial filibuster on William Myers and Henry Saad. Their efforts succeeded on the evening of May 23, 2005, one day before the cloture vote. They announced an agreement by seven Republican and seven Democratic Senators to avert a vote on the nuclear option while preserving the filibuster for "extraordinary circumstances". The block of senators who agreed to the compromise included Republicans John McCain, Lindsey Graham of South Carolina, John Warner of Virginia, Olympia Snowe of Maine, Susan Collins of Maine, Mike DeWine of Ohio, and Lincoln Chafee of Rhode Island; and Democrats Nelson, Joe Lieberman of Connecticut, Robert Byrd of West Virginia, Mary Landrieu of Louisiana, Daniel Inouye of Hawaii, Mark Pryor of Arkansas, and Ken Salazar of Colorado. This group was quickly dubbed "the Gang of 14" in various blogs and news outlets. McCain, Chafee, Collins, and Snowe were already on record as opposing the nuclear option, leaving the Democrats two votes short of defeating an attempt to trigger it (they would have needed 51 votes to override Vice President Dick Cheney's tie-breaking vote).

The bipartisan group was large enough to deny Frist the 50 votes he needed to trigger the nuclear option, and also large enough to reach cloture on a Democratic filibuster. It states, in part:

...we commit to oppose the rules changes in the 109th Congress, which we understand to be any amendment to or interpretation of the Rules of the Senate that would force a vote on a judicial nomination by means other than unanimous consent or Rule XXII.

Democrats in the Gang agreed not to filibuster the judges listed in the agreement (save in "extraordinary" circumstances) and Republicans in the Gang agreed not to vote for the nuclear option. The definition of what constituted an "extraordinary" circumstance was left up to the individual senator. For example, Graham and DeWine let it be known that they did not consider nominations to the Supreme Court to fit the definition.

Frist reluctantly approved the compromise. Several of the blocked nominees were brought to the floor, voted upon and approved as specified in the agreement, and others were dropped and did not come up for a vote, as implied by the agreement. As a result of this agreement, Owen was confirmed 55–43, Brown was confirmed 56–43, and Pryor was confirmed 53–45.

== Later developments ==
The agreement held force until 2013, when the Senate Democratic majority invoked the nuclear option for all nominations except Supreme Court nominations. In 2017, the Senate Republican majority eliminated the Supreme Court exception in order to defeat a filibuster on the nomination of Neil Gorsuch.
