= White House Director of Legislative Affairs =

Government position

The White House director of legislative affairs, officially the assistant to the president and director of the Office of Legislative Affairs, is part of the senior staff of the president of the United States. The officeholder is responsible for developing and promoting the legislative agenda of the president and coordinating with members of both houses of Congress.

The legislative director, who is appointed by and serves at the pleasure of the president, without the need for United States Senate confirmation, is usually given an office in the West Wing of the White House.

== Directors ==
Image	Name	Start	End	President
	Jerry Persons	January 20, 1953	October 7, 1958	Dwight D. Eisenhower (1953–1961)
	Bryce Harlow	October 7, 1958	January 20, 1961	Dwight D. Eisenhower (1953–1961)
	Larry O'Brien	January 20, 1961	November 3, 1965	John F. Kennedy (1961–1963)
	Larry O'Brien	January 20, 1961	November 3, 1965	Lyndon Johnson (1963–1969)
	Vacant	November 3, 1965	May 1967	Lyndon Johnson (1963–1969)
	Barefoot Sanders	May 1967	January 20, 1969	Lyndon Johnson (1963–1969)
	Bryce Harlow	January 20, 1969	November 5, 1969	Richard Nixon (1969–1974)
	Bill Timmons	November 5, 1969	December 31, 1974	Richard Nixon (1969–1974)
	Bill Timmons	November 5, 1969	December 31, 1974	Gerald Ford (1974–1977)
	Max Friedersdorf	December 31, 1974	January 20, 1977	Gerald Ford (1974–1977)
	Frank Moore	January 20, 1977	January 20, 1981	Jimmy Carter (1977–1981)
	Max Friedersdorf	January 20, 1981	January 2, 1982	Ronald Reagan (1981–1989)
	Ken Duberstein	January 2, 1982	December 15, 1983	Ronald Reagan (1981–1989)
	M. B. Oglesby	December 15, 1983	February 28, 1986	Ronald Reagan (1981–1989)
	William Ball	February 28, 1986	March 28, 1988	Ronald Reagan (1981–1989)
	Alan Kranowitz	March 28, 1988	January 20, 1989	Ronald Reagan (1981–1989)
	Fred McClure	January 20, 1989	January 14, 1992	George H. W. Bush (1989–1993)
	Nick Calio	January 14, 1992	January 20, 1993	George H. W. Bush (1989–1993)
	Howard Paster	January 20, 1993	January 1994	Bill Clinton (1993–2001)
	Pat Griffin	January 1994	January 5, 1996	Bill Clinton (1993–2001)
	John Hilley	January 5, 1996	January 1998	Bill Clinton (1993–2001)
	Larry Stein	January 1998	January 5, 2000	Bill Clinton (1993–2001)
	Charles Brain	January 5, 2000	January 20, 2001	Bill Clinton (1993–2001)
	Nick Calio	January 20, 2001	January 2003	George W. Bush (2001–2009)
	David Hobbs	January 2003	January 10, 2005	George W. Bush (2001–2009)
	Candi Wolff	January 10, 2005	March 20, 2007	George W. Bush (2001–2009)
	Dan Meyer	March 20, 2007	January 20, 2009	George W. Bush (2001–2009)
	Phil Schiliro	January 20, 2009	February 11, 2011	Barack Obama (2009–2017)
	Rob Nabors	February 11, 2011	January 25, 2013	Barack Obama (2009–2017)
	Miguel Rodriguez	January 25, 2013	January 1, 2014	Barack Obama (2009–2017)
	Katie Beirne Fallon	January 1, 2014	February 13, 2016	Barack Obama (2009–2017)
	Amy Rosenbaum	February 13, 2016	January 20, 2017	Barack Obama (2009–2017)
	Marc Short	January 20, 2017	July 20, 2018	Donald Trump (2017–2021)
	Shahira Knight	July 20, 2018	June 17, 2019	Donald Trump (2017–2021)
	Eric Ueland	June 17, 2019	June 5, 2020	Donald Trump (2017–2021)
	Amy Swonger	June 5, 2020	January 20, 2021	Donald Trump (2017–2021)
	Louisa Terrell	January 20, 2021	August 1, 2023	Joe Biden (2021–2025)
	Shuwanza Goff	August 1, 2023	January 20, 2025	Joe Biden (2021–2025)
	James Braid	January 20, 2025	October 13, 2026	Donald Trump (2025–present)
	Katie Bailey	October 13, 2026	present	Donald Trump (2025–present)
