= List of University of Tennessee people =

The following is a list of people associated with the University of Tennessee system in all its campuses. The list does not include personnel associated with Oak Ridge National Laboratory.

== Politics and law ==
- Lamar Alexander, former Tennessee governor, UT president and former US senator
- Ali Abu Al-Ragheb, former prime minister of Jordan
- Victor Ashe, U.S. ambassador to Poland, former mayor of Knoxville, Tennessee
- John DeWitt Clinton Atkins, member of House of Representatives
- Richard W. Austin, member of House of Representatives
- Howard Baker, ambassador and former Senate majority leader
- Howard Baker Sr., member of House of Representatives
- William M. Barker, chief justice on Tennessee Supreme Court
- George White Baxter, governor of Wyoming territory
- Ray Blanton, governor of Tennessee, member of House of Representatives
- Marion Speed Boyd, former U.S. district and chief judge for Tennessee
- John Lafayette Camp, politician and Civil War veteran
- William H. Cate, former U.S. congressman from Arkansas
- Brett Carter, U.S. House of Representatives candidate
- Saxby Chambliss, U.S. senator
- Walter Chandler, former mayor of Memphis, Tennessee
- Clement Comer Clay, former governor of Alabama
- Bob Corker, former mayor of Chattanooga; U.S. senator
- John Hervey Crozier, member of House of Representatives
- Arthur B. Culvahouse Jr., former White House counsel
- Lincoln Davis, member of House of Representatives
- Jim DeMint, South Carolina U.S. senator
- M. Jerome Diamond, Vermont attorney general, 1975–1981
- Lurita Doan, former administrator of the U.S. General Services Administration
- Jimmy Duncan, member of House of Representatives
- John Duncan Sr., member of House of Representative
- Winfield Dunn, former governor of Tennessee
- Charlene Fite, Republican member of the Arkansas House of Representatives from Crawford County, Arkansas
- James B. Frazier, former governor of Tennessee and U.S. senator
- Richard Fulton, former Tennessee state senator, US congressman, mayor of metropolitan Nashville
- Shuwanza Goff, political advisor, served as the director of the White House Office of Legislative Affairs under Joe Biden
- Bart Gordon, member of House of Representatives
- Al Gore Jr., former vice president of the United States, US congressman, US senator, professor, and environmentalist, recipient of honorary doctorate, 2010
- Albert Gore Sr., member of House of Representatives and U.S. senator
- Bill Hendon, former member of U.S. House of Representatives
- Van Hilleary, U.S. congressman
- John C. Houk, former member of U.S. House of Representatives
- Thomas G. Hull, former member of U.S. House of Representatives
- Amadou Scattred Janneh, former secretary of state for Communication, Information and Technology, from The Gambia
- Ray Jenkins, Senate counsel during the Army-McCarthy Hearings
- William L. Jenkins, member of U.S. House of Representatives
- Ed Jones, former member of U.S. House of Representatives
- Jim Justice, governor of West Virginia
- Joel A. Katz, entertainment lawyer (UT College of Law)
- Estes Kefauver, former U.S. senator
- Arthur Larson, politician
- Guy A. Lewis, former U.S. attorney for the Southern District of Florida
- Dan Lipinski, U.S. congressman (D-IL) and former professor
- William Gibbs McAdoo, former United States secretary of the Treasury
- John E. McCall, former member of U.S. House of Representatives
- Jimmy Naifeh, speaker of the House, Tennessee House of Representatives
- John Randolph Neal Jr., Scopes Trial attorney
- Thomas Amos Rogers Nelson, former member of U.S. House of Representatives
- George W. Ochs, former mayor of Chattanooga
- Michael C. Polt, U.S. ambassador to Serbia
- Percy Priest, former member of U.S. House of Representatives
- Bob Ramsey (born 1947), Republican member of the Tennessee House of Representatives
- Glenn Reynolds, UT law professor and author of the Instapundit political weblog
- Mercer Reynolds, former U.S. ambassador to Switzerland
- Madeline Rogero, first female mayor of Knoxville
- Kenneth Rush, former U.S. ambassador to Germany
- Edward Terry Sanford, former U.S. Supreme Court justice
- Jim Sasser, former U.S. senator
- Ronald L. Schlicher, former U.S. ambassador to Cyprus
- Margaret Scobey, former U.S. ambassador to Syria and Egypt
- Heath Shuler, U.S. representative from North Carolina; former NFL player
- William P. Sims, Arizona state senator
- William Pruden Smith, former mayor, Miami
- William R. Snodgrass, former comptroller of Tennessee
- Paul Summers, former attorney general of State of Tennessee
- John S. Tanner, member of House of Representatives
- Deborah Tate, United States Federal Communications Commission commissioner
- George Caldwell Taylor, former U.S. district judge
- Lawrence Tyson, former U.S. senator
- Gary R. Wade, Tennessee Supreme Court appointee, as of 2006
- Herbert S. Walters, former U.S. senator
- Zach Wamp, member of House of Representatives
- Allen West, U.S. representative from Florida
- Washington C. Whitthorne, former U.S. senator
- Laura I. Wiley, former member of the North Carolina General Assembly; current member of the University of North Carolina Board of Governors
- Paul Young, mayor of Memphis, Tennessee

== Education ==
- Edward L. Ayers, former president of the University of Richmond
- Guy Bailey, 15th president of Texas Tech University; president of the University of Alabama
- Philander P. Claxton Sr., founder of the UT Department of Education and U.S. commissioner of education, 1911–1921
- Bob Clement, president of Cumberland University and politician
- Bryan Coker, 12th president of Maryville College
- Margaret Cuninggim, former dean of women at the University of Tennessee
- David L. Eubanks, former president of Johnson Bible College
- John Gaventa, political sociologist
- Lee Giles, computer scientist, CiteSeer, David Reese Professor at the Pennsylvania State University
- John Rice Irwin, historian, founder of Museum of Appalachia
- Annie Kennedy, first member of the faculty elected at the Alabama Girls' Industrial School (now, University of Montevallo)
- Joe L. Kincheloe (1950–2008), professor and Canada Research Chair at the Faculty of Education, McGill University in Montreal; founder of The Paulo and Nita Freire International Project for Critical Pedagogy; author of more than 45 books and more than one hundred journal articles on issues including critical pedagogy, educational research, urban studies, cognition, curriculum, and cultural studies
- William Allen Montgomery (1829–1905), graduated in 1850; lawyer, planter, Confederate chaplain and Baptist minister; president of Carson–Newman University 1888–1892
- John Thomas Mentzer (~1951–2010), marketing and supply chain scholar
- F. Ann Millner, 11th president of Weber State University
- Velma McBride Murry, psychologist and sociologist at Vanderbilt University
- Shirley Raines, 12th president of University of Memphis
- Linwood H. Rose, 5th president of James Madison University
- Stephen Wallace Taylor, historian and chair of the Department of History and Political Science at Macon State College
- W. I. Thomas, sociologist
- Bernie L. Wade, chancellor, International Circle of Faith Colleges and Seminaries
- Lorna Williams, leader in Indigenous education and UNESCO International Decade of Indigenous Languages task force member
- Nelson W. Winbush, schoolteacher, assistant principal, and Neo-Confederate activist

== Actors, directors, and entertainers ==
- Clarence Brown, Academy Award-nominated film director
- Dixie Carter, actress
- Henry Cho, comedian
- John Cullum, actor and singer
- James Denton, actor, Desperate Housewives
- Dale Dickey, actress
- James Dobson actor
- Melanie Hutsell, comedian, actress
- David Keith, actor and director
- Logan Marshall-Green, actor, Spider-Man: Homecoming and Upgrade
- Leanne Morgan, comedian, actress and author
- Park Overall, actress
- Constance Shulman, voice-over artist, actress
- Tramell Tillman, actor

== Artists and musicians ==
- Deana Carter, country music singer and songwriter
- Ashley Cleveland, gospel singer
- James Denton, actor
- The Dirty Guv'nahs, rock band
- Thomas Fulton, opera conductor
- Drew Holcomb, singer and songwriter
- Ellie Holcomb, singer and songwriter
- Byron McKeeby, artist
- Wardell Milan, artist
- Lewis Cosby, bass player, 10 Years
- John Howell Morrison, composer
- Bobby Ogdin – recording studio pianist, member of Elvis Presley's TCB Band
- Park Overall, actress
- Anna Maria Parry, fabric designer and textile artist
- Dolly Parton, country music singer, recipient of honorary doctorate, 2009
- Cheryl Lynn Studer, opera soprano
- Pam Tillis, country music singer
- Gil Trythall, composer and pianist
- Richard Aaker Trythall, composer and pianist
- Keith Wallen, singer and songwriter, Breaking Benjamin
- Sarah Webb, artist
- Delores Ziegler, opera singer

== Authors ==
- Travis Beacham, screenwriter
- Lowell Cunningham, comic book writer
- Owen Davis, playwright
- Bruce Foster, paper engineer, pop-up children's books creator
- Chris Grabenstein, author
- Alex Haley, novelist, biographer and essayist
- May Justus, author of children's books
- Joseph Wood Krutch, novelist, critic and naturalist
- Richard Marius, novelist, scholar and speechwriter
- Cormac McCarthy, novelist
- John C. McManus, PhD, military historian and professor of military history
- Dave Ramsey, financial guru, author, and host of The Ramsey Show
- Brad Vice, short story writer
- Kurt Vonnegut, writer
- Allen Wier, fiction writer and scholar
- William Garrett Wright, poet

== Business and economy ==
- Charles Scott Abbott, one of the two originators of Trivial Pursuit
- Claudia Brind-Woody, IBM executive
- James Clayton, president and CEO of Clayton Homes
- Michael T. Dugan, educator and accounting scholar
- Charlie Ergen, CEO of Echostar
- James Haslam Jr., founder and CEO of Pilot Corporation
- Charles O. Holliday, chairman of Bank of America and Former Chairman of DuPont
- Thomas M. Humphrey, economist and author
- Min Kao, CEO and founder of Garmin
- Frank Knight, economist
- William H. Lane, business executive and former chairman of Augusta National Golf Club and The Masters
- Tim Love, chef
- Godwin Maduka, doctor and philanthropist
- Charles McClung McGhee, late 19th-century Knoxville railroad magnate and financier
- Abdisalam Omer, governor of the Central Bank of Somalia
- Rex Repass, US-based public opinion and marketing research executive
- Jerry Sisk Jr., gemologist and television executive, co-founded Jewelry Television in 1993
- Donnie Smith, CEO of Tyson Foods
- Chris Whittle, founder of Whittle Communications and Edison Schools
- Blake Stephano, founder, co-owner, and CEO of Highland Destinations and Thaw Out

== Military ==
- Burwell B. Bell III, U.S. Army commander
- Robert Emmet Callan, major general in the U.S. Army and assistant chief of staff in the War Department, 1931–1935
- Clifton B. Cates, aide to President Woodrow Wilson and later commandant of the Marine Corps
- Thomas A. Davis, captain of Spanish–American War
- Norman C. Gaddis, former deputy chief of staff, Plans and Operations, Headquarters U.S. Air Force
- Robert C. Hinson, former deputy commander-in-chief of United States Strategic Command
- Bruce K. Holloway, military commander of Allied Forces
- Ridley McLean, rear admiral in the U.S. Navy; wrote the Bluejacket's Manual, which is still used to teach naval recruits the basics of seamanship
- Spurgeon Neel, major general, pioneer in aeromedical evacuation
- Austin C. Shofner, World War II U.S. general
- Maurice F. Weisner, former Pacific Fleet admiral

== Athletics and sportscasters ==
- Monica Abbott, former NPF pitcher for the Washington Glory, Olympian (2008)
- Kyle Alexander (born 1996), basketball player for Hapoel Tel Aviv of the Israeli Basketball Premier League
- Chris Daw, Paralympic gold medalist
- Pete Athas, former NFL player
- Bill Bates, former NFL Pro Bowl safety
- Bianca Belair (born Bianca Blair), professional wrestler in WWE
- Buddy Bolding, former head baseball coach at Longwood University in Farmville, Virginia
- Dick Bowers, former athletic director for the University of South Florida
- Chris Burke, retired Major League Baseball player
- Kevin Burnett, former NFL player
- Ray Bussard, Hall of Fame and Olympic swimming coach, 1968–1989
- Tamika Catchings, former WNBA player, two-time Olympian (2004, 2008)
- Joey Clinkscales, professional football wide receiver, scout, and executive
- Alan Cockrell, former Major League Baseball outfielder and coach
- Denny Crawford, professional football guard
- Jonathan Crompton, former NFL quarterback
- Antone Davis, former National Football League (NFL) offensive lineman
- Doug Dickey, College Football Hall of Fame head coach at the University of Tennessee (1964–1969) and the University of Florida (1970–1978); athletic director at Tennessee (1985–2002)
- R. A. Dickey, professional baseball pitcher
- Bobby Dodd, college football coach and athletic director at Georgia Tech
- Dale Ellis, former NBA player
- Beattie Feathers, former NFL player; collegiate football and baseball coach
- Paul Finebaum, radio host and journalist
- Cory Fleming, former NFL wide receiver
- Richmond Flowers, former NFL player
- Arian Foster, former NFL running back
- Phillip Fulmer, head coach of Tennessee Volunteers football team (1992–2008)
- Harry Galbreath, former NFL offensive lineman
- Charlie Garner, NFL running back
- Phil Garner, former Major League Baseball player and manager
- Justin Gatlin, 2004 Summer Olympics 100m gold medalist
- Willie Gault, former NFL wide receiver
- Bobby Gordon, football player
- Sam Graddy, 1984 Summer Olympics 100m silver medalist and 4 × 100 m gold medalist
- Ray Graves, former NFL player; University of Florida head football coach (1960–1969) and athletic director (1960–1979); College Football Hall of Fame (1990)
- Ernie Grunfeld, former NBA player and current president of basketball operations, Washington Wizards
- Travis Haney, college football writer for ESPN Insider
- Alvin Harper, former NFL wide receiver
- Dee Haslam, businesswoman and co-owner of the Cleveland Browns
- Jimmy Haslam, co-owner of the Cleveland Browns
- Albert Haynesworth, NFL defensive tackle
- Todd Helton, Hall of Fame Major League Baseball first baseman for the Colorado Rockies
- Luke Hochevar, professional baseball player
- Chamique Holdsclaw, former WNBA player, Olympian (2000)
- Rick Honeycutt, former Major League Baseball player and current pitching coach for the Los Angeles Dodgers
- Allan Houston, former NBA shooting guard
- Luke Hudson, former MLB pitcher
- Rickea Jackson, WNBA small forward, Los Angeles Sparks
- Josiah-Jordan James (born 2000), basketball forward in the Israeli Basketball Premier League
- Austin Johnson, former NFL player
- Dale Jones, former NFL player and current assistant coach at Appalachian State
- Lars Jorgensen (born 1970), swimmer and college coach
- Steve Kiner, former NFL player, College Football Hall of Fame inductee
- Bernard King, former NBA player
- Kara Lawson, WNBA player, Olympian (2008), ESPN analyst
- Jamal Lewis, NFL running back
- Jeremy Linn, swimmer, won one gold and one silver medal at the 1996 Summer Olympics in Atlanta, Georgia
- Christine Magnuson, swimmer, won two silver medals at the 2008 Summer Olympics in Beijing, China
- Johnny Majors, College Football Hall of Fame 1987, Heisman Trophy runner-up (1956); head football coach at Iowa State University (1968–1972), University of Pittsburgh (1973–1976) and the University of Tennessee (1977–1992)
- Peyton Manning,(Class of 1997) NFL quarterback
- Tee Martin, former NFL quarterback
- Steve Matthews, former NFL quarterback
- Jeronne Maymon (born 1991), basketball player for Hapoel Eilat B.C. of the Israeli Basketball Premier League
- Bill Mayo, All-American
- Jacques McClendon, NFL offensive lineman
- Tim McGee, NFL receiver
- Ross McGowan, professional golfer
- Greg McMichael, former Major League Baseball player
- Charles McRae, former NFL offensive lineman
- Jordan McRae (born 1991), basketball player for Hapoel Tel Aviv of the Israeli Basketball Premier League
- Aries Merritt, 2012 Summer Olympics 110m hurdles gold medalist
- Anthony Miller, former NFL pro Bowl wide receiver
- Mike Miller, NFL player
- Chris Moneymaker, 2003 World Series of Poker Main Event winner
- Tom Myslinski, former NFL center
- Kevin Nash, former professional wrestler and UT basketball player
- Lindsey Nelson, sportscaster
- Augie Ojeda, Major League Baseball player for the Arizona Diamondbacks
- Mary Ostrowski, former U.S. National Team gold medalist, West Virginia Sports Hall of Fame
- Candace Parker, WNBA player, Olympian (2008)
- Woody Paige, sports analyst for The Denver Post and ESPN's Around the Horn
- Bruce Pearl, former men's head basketball coach, NABC Division I Coach of the Year, AP Co-Coach of the Year, Sporting News Coach of the Year
- Buzz Peterson, former men's head basketball coach
- Carl Pickens, former NFL Pro Bowl wide receiver
- Peerless Price, former NFL Pro Bowl wide receiver
- Semeka Randall, former WNBA player
- Josh Richardson, professional basketball player, currently plays for the Miami Heat
- Mychal Rivera, tight end; brother of Glee actress Naya Rivera
- Pat Ryan, former NFL player
- Ovince St. Preux, collegiate football defensive end and linebacker; professional mixed martial artist, formerly with Strikeforce and currently with the UFC
- Mike Smithson, former MLB pitcher
- Robert Shaw, former NFL center
- Michelle Snow, former WNBA player
- Donté Stallworth, NFL WR
- Drew Steckenrider, professional baseball pitcher
- Melvin Stewart, swimmer, won two gold medals and one bronze medal at the 1992 Summer Olympics in Barcelona, Spain
- Pat Summitt, former women's basketball head coach (1974–2012); member of Naismith Memorial and Women's Basketball Halls of Fame; Olympian (1976); head coach for the 1984 Olympic women's basketball team that won gold
- Tyler Summitt, Pat's son and former women's basketball program head coach at Louisiana Tech
- Lenny Taylor, NFL player
- Holly Warlick, former Lady Vols basketball player and former Lady Vols head coach (2012–2019)
- Chuck Webb, NFL player
- Reggie White, former NFL defensive lineman
- Ron Widby, former NFL Pro Bowl punter
- Grant Williams, NBA player
- Jordan Williams, NFL player
- Rhyne Williams, professional tennis player
- Al Wilson, NFL player
- Gibril Wilson, NFL safety
- Jason Witten, NFL Pro Bowl tight end
- Gene Wojciechowski, college football reporter and senior writer for ESPN The Magazine
- Bob Woodruff, head football coach at Baylor University (1947–1949); head football coach and athletic director at the University of Florida (1950–1959)
- Chris Woodruff, associate head coach at the University of Tennessee, former professional tennis player

== Journalists and newscasters ==
- Richard Ernsberger Jr., senior editor, Newsweek
- Huell Howser, California television personality
- Ryan McGee, ESPN writer and commentator
- Ann Taylor, NPR newscaster
- Gene Wojciechowski, ESPN writer and commentator

== Rhodes Scholars ==
- Nancy-Ann Min DeParle, Balliol College, B.A. 1981 MA 1986
- William Everett Derryberry, St. John's College, BA 1932 MA 1940
- Bernadotte E. Schmitt, Merton College, BA 1908, M.A 1913

== Nobel laureates ==
- James Buchanan, winner of the 1986 Nobel Memorial Prize in Economic Sciences; received an M.S. degree from UT in 1941
- Peter C. Doherty, winner of the 1996 Nobel Prize in Physiology or Medicine; faculty member in the UT Health Science Center in Memphis

== Pulitzer prize winners ==
- John Netherland Heiskell, 1893 graduate of the University of Tennessee; publisher and editor of the Arkansas Gazette', 1902–1972; under his leadership, the paper won a Pulitzer Prize for meritorious public service
- Owen Davis, 1889 graduate, won the Pulitzer Prize for his play Icebound in 1923
- Cormac McCarthy, novelist, attended University of Tennessee in 1951–1952 and 1957–1960; won the Pulitzer Prize in 2007 for The Road
- Bernadotte E. Schmitt, earned a bachelor of arts at the University of Tennessee in 1902, won a Pulitzer in History in 1931 for his book The Coming of the War, 1914 (1930)
- John Noble Wilford, 1955 graduate of the University of Tennessee; won two Pulitzer Prizes for national reporting; science correspondent for The New York Times, and founder of the paper's weekly science section
- Edward Osborne Wilson, attended University of Tennessee 1950–1951, won two Pulitzer Prizes for nonfiction for his books On Human Nature (1979) and The Ants (1991)

== Science and technology ==
- Mladen Bestvina, topologist, professor of mathematics at University of Utah
- William E. Bickley, entomologist
- William M. Bugg, physicist, professor of physics at the University of Tennessee
- Jack Dongarra, computer science professor; creator of LINPACK and LAPACK; 2021 Turing Award recipient
- Gertrude Ehrlich, professor of mathematics at University of Maryland, College Park
- William Flatt, animal and nutritional scientist
- Weston Fulton, meteorologist, inventor
- Lee Giles, computer scientist, CiteSeer, David Reese Professor at Pennsylvania State University
- Geoffrey L. Greene, neutron physicist, Tom W. Bonner Prize in Nuclear Physics winner, professor and researcher at the University of Tennessee and the Oak Ridge National Laboratory
- Hal Herzog, anthrozoologist
- Lexemuel Ray Hesler, mycologist
- Carl B. Huffaker, biologist and agricultural scientist
- Mohammad Ataul Karim, physicist
- Frank Knight, economist
- Mounir Laroussi, plasma physicist, pioneer of plasma medicine
- Madeline Kneberg Lewis, archaeologist of the Southeastern United States
- Joana Kuntz, organizational psychologist in New Zealand
- Harry McSween, planetary scientist
- Gerald North, atmospheric scientist, author of North Report and The Impact of Global Warming in Texas
- Douglas W. Owsley, division head of physical anthropology of Smithsonian's National Museum of Natural History
- Ronald H. Petersen, mycologist of the University of Tennessee
- Barry Preedom, physicist, professor of physics and astronomy at the University of South Carolina
- Alan Rabinowitz, zoologist, CEO of Panthera
- Edward K. Reedy, radar researcher and director of the Georgia Tech Research Institute, 1998–2003
- Subrata Roy, inventor, professor of aerospace engineering at the University of Florida
- Antoinette Rodez Schiesler, chemist, director of research at Villanova University
- Jeremy C. Smith, Governor's Chair and director of UT/ORNL Center for Molecular Biophysics
- Morwen Thistlethwaite, knot theorist
- Peter Tsai, chemist, inventor of the N95 mask
- Vincent Van Brunt, chemical engineer
- E.O. Wilson, biologist and naturalist

== Astronauts ==
- Jeffrey Ashby
- Randolph Bresnik
- Joe Edwards
- Dominic L. Pudwill Gorie
- Chris Hadfield
- Henry Hartsfield
- Charles O. Hobaugh
- Scott J. Kelly
- Donald H. Peterson
- Margaret Rhea Seddon
- Barry E. Wilmore

== Faculty ==
- Sandra Blain (born 1941), ceramicist, potter, and sculptor
- Charles W. Kent (1860–1917), scholar of the English language
- Vernon Lattin (born 1938), president of Brooklyn College
- Carolyn Ringer Lepre, 10th president of Salisbury University
- Jill Mikucki, microbiologist, Antarctic researcher
- Kate Vitasek (born 1968), author and educator, adjunct faculty in the Haslam College of Business Global Supply Chain Institute and the Graduate and Executive Education
- Charles (Mike) Godsey (born 1955), adjunct professor at Ohio Dominican University, teaching Computer Science and Cybersecurity.
