= Bickley (surname) =

Bickley is a surname. Notable people with the surname include:

- Ancella Radford Bickley (born 1930), American historian and educator
- Augustus Charles Bickley (1857–1902), British journalist, novelist, and biographer
- Benjamin Bickley Rogers (1828–1919), British classical scholar and barrister
- Bickley baronets (generations from c.1582–1752), a baronetcy in Norfolk, England
- Clayton Clealand Bickley Mitchel (1900–1988), Australian politician
- Dan Bickley (born 1963), American sports writer and radio host, and guitarist
- George Harvey Bickley (1868–1924), American Methodist Episcopal bishop
- George W. L. Bickley (1823–1867), American Civil War figure, physician, secret society founder, and novelist
- Graham Bickley (born 1958), British actor and singer
- John Bickley (disambiguation), several people
- Joseph Bickley (1835–1923), British builder of real tennis courts
- Howard L. Bickley (1871–1947), American lawyer, politician, and judge
- Mark Bickley (born 1969), Australian rules football player
- Ron Bickley (1926–2020), Australian rules football player
- Susan Bickley, British mezzo-soprano opera singer
- Thomas Bickley (1518–1596), British Protestant bishop, Marian exile, and college warden
- Wallace Bickley (1810–1876), British-born Australian politician
- William E. Bickley (1914–2010), American entomologist
