= Bickley (disambiguation) =

Bickley is an area of London, England.

Bickley may also refer to:

- Bickley (band), a punk rock band from Houston, Texas
- Bickley, Cheshire, England
- Bickley, Georgia, United States
- Bickley (surname)
- Bickley, Western Australia, Australia
- Bickley, Worcestershire, a location in England
- Bickley baronets, a title in the Baronetage of England

== See also ==
- Bickle, a surname
- Bickleigh (disambiguation)
