= 2009 World Series =

105th edition of Major League Baseball's championship series

Team (Wins)	Managers	Season
New York Yankees (4)	Joe Girardi	103–59 (.636), GA: 8
Philadelphia Phillies (2)	Charlie Manuel	93–69 (.574), GA: 6
- Dates: October 28–November 4
- Venue(s): Yankee Stadium (New York); Citizens Bank Park (Philadelphia)
- MVP: Hideki Matsui (New York)
- Umpires: Gerry Davis (crew chief), Jeff Nelson, Brian Gorman, Mike Everitt, Dana DeMuth, Joe West
- Hall of Famers: Yankees: Derek Jeter; Mariano Rivera; CC Sabathia; Phillies: Pedro Martínez

Broadcast
- Television: Fox (United States); MLB International (International)
- TV announcers: Joe Buck and Tim McCarver (Fox); Dave O'Brien and Rick Sutcliffe (MLB International)
- Radio: ESPN; WCBS (NYY); WPHT (PHI)
- Radio announcers: Jon Miller and Joe Morgan (ESPN); John Sterling and Suzyn Waldman (WCBS); Scott Franzke, Tom McCarthy, Chris Wheeler, Larry Andersen and Gary Matthews (WPHT)
- ALCS: New York Yankees over Los Angeles Angels of Anaheim (4–2)
- NLCS: Philadelphia Phillies over Los Angeles Dodgers (4–1)

The 2009 World Series was the championship series of Major League Baseball's (MLB) 2009 season. As the 105th edition of the World Series, it was a best-of-seven playoff contested between the Philadelphia Phillies, champions of the National League (NL) and defending World Series champions, and the New York Yankees, champions of the American League (AL). The Yankees defeated the Phillies, 4 games to 2, winning their 27th World Series championship and their first since 2000.

The series was played between October 28 and November 4, broadcast on Fox, and watched by an average of roughly 19 million viewers. Home field advantage for the Series went to the AL for the eighth straight year as a result of its 4–3 win in the All-Star Game. The Phillies earned their berth into the playoffs by winning the National League East. The Yankees won the American League East to earn their berth, posting the best record in the Major Leagues. The Phillies reached the World Series by defeating the Colorado Rockies in the best-of-five National League Division Series and the Los Angeles Dodgers in the best-of-seven NL Championship Series (NLCS). The Yankees defeated the Minnesota Twins in the American League Division Series and the Los Angeles Angels of Anaheim in the AL Championship Series (ALCS) to advance to their first World Series since 2003. As a result of their loss, the Phillies became the first team since the 2001 Yankees to lose the World Series after winning it the previous year. The Phillies were also the last defending champions to make the World Series until the 2025 Dodgers.

Cliff Lee pitched a complete game in the Phillies' Game 1 victory, allowing only one unearned run, while Chase Utley hit two home runs. In Game 2, solo home runs by Mark Teixeira and Hideki Matsui helped the Yankees win by a score of 3–1. After a rain delayed start, Game 3 featured more offense, with a combined six home runs and thirteen total runs en route to a Yankee victory. The Yankees won Game 4 by scoring the decisive three runs in the ninth inning after an alert base running play by Johnny Damon. The Phillies avoided elimination with a win in Game 5, aided by Utley's second two–home run game of the series. The Yankees secured their World Series championship with a Game 6 victory in which Matsui hit his third home run of the series. He was named Most Valuable Player (MVP) of the series, making him the first Japanese-born player and the first full-time designated hitter to win the award. Matsui was the series' MVP despite starting only the three games that were played at Yankee Stadium, since the designated hitter position was not used in NL ballparks at the time.

Several records were tied, extended, or broken during this World Series, including team championships (Yankees with 27), career postseason wins (Andy Pettitte with 18), career World Series saves (Mariano Rivera with 11), home runs in a World Series (Utley with five), strikeouts by a hitter in a World Series (Ryan Howard with 13), and runs batted in in a single World Series game (Matsui with six).

As of 2026, this remains the Yankees' last World Series championship. They made it to the World Series 15 years later, but were defeated in five games by the Los Angeles Dodgers.

== Teams ==
This was the seventh New York–Pennsylvania matchup in the World Series (1905, 1911, 1913, 1927, 1950, 1960). This was also the fifth meeting between teams from Philadelphia and New York City for a major professional sports championship, which previously occurred in four World Series (1905, 1911, 1913, 1950).

=== Philadelphia Phillies ===
During the off-season, the Phillies promoted assistant general manager Rubén Amaro Jr. to general manager, succeeding Pat Gillick who retired at the end of a three-year contract. Their most notable offseason player change was in left field, as Pat Burrell departed due to free agency and was replaced by free agent Raúl Ibañez. Another notable acquisition was free agent pitcher Chan Ho Park. Park was originally signed as a backup option for the bullpen, as reliever J. C. Romero was assigned a 50-game suspension after violating the Major League Baseball drug policy, but Park won the fifth starter's job in Spring Training.

In July 2009, Phillies scouts evaluated pitcher Pedro Martínez in two simulated games against the Phillies DSL team, leading to a one-year, $1-million contract. Replacing Jamie Moyer as a starter in the Phillies rotation on August 12, 2009, Philadelphia won each of Martínez's first seven starts, the first time in franchise history that this had occurred with any debuting Phillies pitcher. The Phillies made one large acquisition at the trade deadline, trading four minor league players to the Cleveland Indians for pitcher Cliff Lee and outfielder Ben Francisco. Lee won seven of his 12 regular season starts for Philadelphia in 2009.

During the regular season, the Phillies led the National League East for most of the year, taking first place for good on May 30. Ibáñez had started the year strongly, batting well over .300 with 17 home runs and 46 runs batted in (RBI) in the first two months of the season, which led the New York Post to call him an "early MVP candidate". He was placed on the disabled list in mid-June for a groin injury, however, and though he returned he did not bat above .260 for any other month that season. Although Ibáñez did not receive MVP votes his teammates Ryan Howard and Chase Utley had successful years, finishing 3rd and 8th in the balloting respectively. The Phillies finished the season with a record of 93–69 (.574), six games above the second-place Florida Marlins in their division.

The second-seeded Phillies defeated the wild card Colorado Rockies in the National League Division Series (NLDS), three games to one, advancing to the National League Championship Series (NLCS). Facing the Los Angeles Dodgers again, making the first NLCS rematch in back-to-back years since 2004-05 series, when Houston faced St. Louis, and the 3rd LCS rematch in back-to-back years since 2000 (the other in the 2003-04 ALCS between New York and Boston), the Phillies won the NLCS, four games to one, becoming the first team to repeat as National League champions since the 1995–96 Atlanta Braves. Ryan Howard won the NLCS MVP for his strong offensive performance during the series. Howard tied Lou Gehrig's postseason record by having at least one RBI in eight straight games across the NLDS and NLCS. They became the first World Series champion to return to the World Series the following year since the 2000–01 New York Yankees.

=== New York Yankees ===
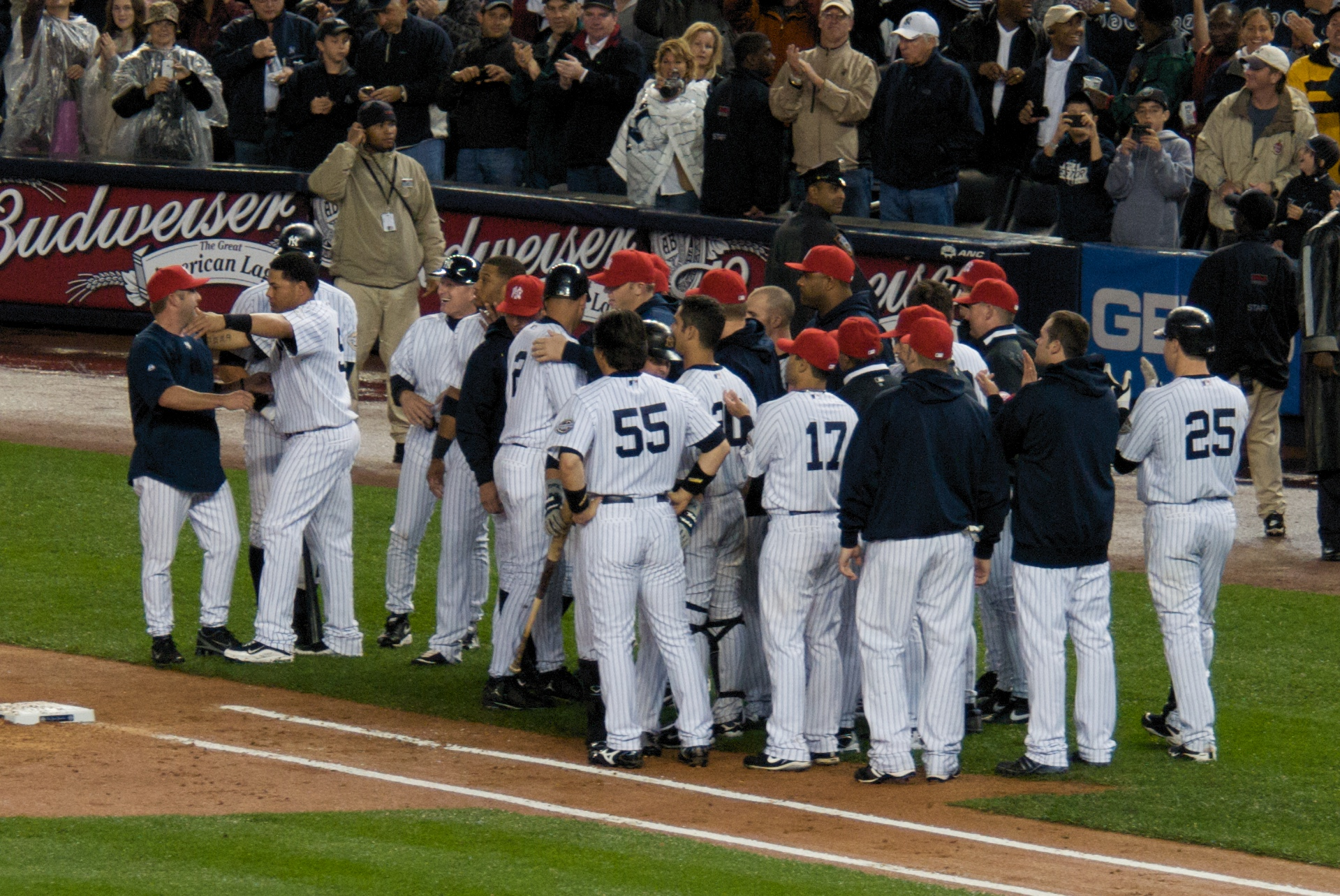
The Yankees celebrate Derek Jeter breaking their franchise career hits record.

The Yankees' offseason began in November 2008 with control over their organization shifting from long-time owner George Steinbrenner to his son Hal Steinbrenner. Notable player departures included Mike Mussina—who announced his retirement on November 20, 2008—as well as Bobby Abreu, Jason Giambi, and Carl Pavano, who all left as free agents. Notable free agent acquisitions included starting pitchers CC Sabathia and A. J. Burnett and first baseman Mark Teixeira. Another major addition was outfielder Nick Swisher, acquired in a trade with the Chicago White Sox.

The Yankees played the 2009 season in "New" Yankee Stadium, their first year in that park after playing for 84 years in "Old" Yankee Stadium. They won the American League East with an eight-game lead over their rivals, the Boston Red Sox, compiling a record of 103–59. Sabathia won 19 games and position players Alex Rodriguez and Teixeira both had strong seasons offensively, Rodriguez with 30 home runs and 100 RBI and Teixeira with 39 and 122 respectively. Closing pitcher Mariano Rivera earned his 500th save against the Yankees' cross-town rival New York Mets, becoming the second pitcher in history to do so. On September 11, 2009, shortstop Derek Jeter recorded his 2,722nd career hit, passing Lou Gehrig to become the all-time leader in career hits recorded as a Yankee.

The top-seeded Yankees defeated the third-seeded Minnesota Twins in three games in the American League Division Series and the second-seeded Los Angeles Angels of Anaheim in six games in the American League Championship Series (ALCS) to win their first American League pennant since 2003. Sabathia was named MVP of the ALCS with two wins in the series. The Yankees' victory in the ALCS earned them their 40th World Series appearance in franchise history, and their first since losing to the Florida Marlins in 2003.

=== Series preview ===
How great would that be? A World Series here, us against the Yankees? We've proved we can put on a pretty good show.

— Jimmy Rollins, discussing the potential of a Yankees–Phillies World Series on May 24, 2009.

The two teams played a three-game interleague series at Yankee Stadium in May 2009, with the defending World Series champion Phillies winning two of the three games. The series included two blown saves by Phillies' closer Brad Lidge in games 2 and 3, although the Phillies came back to win the final game in extra innings.

The Yankees had home field advantage for the Series as the American League had won that year's All-Star Game, a year after the "Old" Yankee Stadium hosted the 2008 All-Star Game. The team match-up was heavily discussed and analyzed in the media prior to the beginning of the series. Both teams' offensive lineups were heavily touted, with the Yankees and Phillies leading their respective leagues in runs scored per game. Yankees third baseman Alex Rodriguez drew particular focus in the media for his success in earlier rounds of the 2009 playoffs in contrast to past postseason performances. The two lineups featured 20 former All-Stars and three former MVP award winners. Only one regular starter between both teams, Phillies catcher Carlos Ruiz, did not have at least ten home runs during the 2009 regular season. The two teams combined for 468 home runs during the season, more than any pair of opponents in World Series history.

The pitching staffs were also the subject of significant discussion prior to the series. The starting pitchers for Game 1, CC Sabathia and Cliff Lee, were regarded as aces who dominated the 2009 postseason with a 0.96 earned run average (ERA) between them. This matchup was of particular note, as Sabathia and Lee were former teammates from the Cleveland Indians and each had won a Cy Young Award with that franchise. Yankees manager Joe Girardi had been using a three-man starting rotation during the playoffs, in contrast to the four-pitcher rotation used by the Phillies. This difference led USA Today to give the Phillies' starting rotation the "edge" in the series, as the World Series had one fewer day off than previous rounds of the playoffs, making the series less conducive to using a three-man rotation. Gene Wojciechowski of ESPN criticized Girardi's strategy, arguing that Chad Gaudin should have pitched in Game 5 or 6, instead of A. J. Burnett or Andy Pettitte on reduced, three days' rest. Wojciechowski argued that while Sabathia had proven his ability to pitch on shorter rest, Burnett and Pettitte should have been given their regular time between starts. Burnett had drawn some criticism, as he performed poorly in his last appearance before the World Series, a start in Game 5 of the ALCS in which he allowed six runs over six innings. However, Burnett had previously been successful on short rest, going 4–0 with a 2.33 ERA in four career starts on short rest before this game. Some believed Girardi settled on a three-man rotation because he had limited options for a fourth starting pitcher, either Gaudin or Joba Chamberlain, who had been inconsistent as starters in the regular season and had been shifted into the bullpen for the postseason.

The matchup of closers, Mariano Rivera and Brad Lidge, also drew attention. Rivera and Lidge were the only closers who had not blown a save during the 2009 postseason, whereas closers on other postseason teams blew 11 saves in the 24 postseason games before the World Series. Both had performed well during the postseason, but Lidge had posted a 7.21 ERA during the 2009 regular season, in contrast to Rivera's 1.76. Lidge's 2009 numbers were in stark contrast to the previous season (41 out of 41 save opportunities, a 1.95 ERA, and 92 strikeouts in 62 games). As a result, USA Today gave the Yankees the edge, noting that Lidge had blown two saves against the Yankees during their regular season series earlier that year.

== Background ==
The Series started on October 28, 2009, which was the latest start in World Series history, beating the previous record held by the 2001 World Series (October 27). Game 4 was played on Sunday, November 1 and the series-winning Game 6 took place on November 4. The Series was only the third to end in a month other than October. The first came in 1918, which was played entirely in September after the regular season was cut short due to World War I. The other such series was in 2001, when the September 11 attacks caused a delay in the baseball season that eventually forced the end of the World Series into November.

Earlier in the season Commissioner Bud Selig expressed interest in scheduling a World Series game during daylight hours instead of the evening. The starting times were ultimately moved before 8 p.m. ET for the first time in 30 years, but no day games were played. The Philadelphia Eagles and New York Giants of the National Football League (NFL) played across the street from Citizens Bank Park at Lincoln Financial Field on the day of Game 4. The NFL moved that game's kickoff time to 1 p.m. to avoid it ending too close to the start of Game 4. Similarly, Game 5 was played at Citizens Bank Park on the same day as the Philadelphia Flyers hosted the Tampa Bay Lightning of the National Hockey League (NHL) at the Wachovia Center. The opening faceoff of the hockey game was scheduled for 7 p.m. but the NHL moved it to 5 p.m. to avoid conflict.

The umpires for the series were Joe West, Dana DeMuth, Gerry Davis, Brian Gorman, Jeff Nelson and Mike Everitt. The World Series crew had included at least 1 umpire who had never worked the World Series in 24 of the past 25 series; however, following several mistakes by umpires in earlier rounds of the playoffs, this crew did not.

The Phillies had won the previous season's World Series against the Tampa Bay Rays for the franchise's second championship. The Yankees had lost their previous World Series appearance to the Florida Marlins in 2003 and had not won since 2000 against the New York Mets. This was the fifth Series played between teams from New York and Philadelphia, the first Yankees–Phillies matchup since 1950, and the seventh New York–Pennsylvania matchup in the World Series (1905, 1911, 1913, 1927, 1950, 1960). The series also was the fourth consecutive time that the Phillies would have faced a team from the current AL East in the World Series, while the Yankees had faced a NL East opponent in four of their five most recent World Series appearances.

This Series had two unofficial nicknames: "Turnpike Series", for the New Jersey Turnpike, which connects New York to Philadelphia through the state of New Jersey, and "Liberty Series", based on the Liberty Bell in Philadelphia and the Statue of Liberty in New York.

== Summary ==
New York (AL) won the series, 4–2.

Game	Date	Score	Location	Time	Attendance
1	October 28	Philadelphia Phillies – 6, New York Yankees – 1	Yankee Stadium	3:27	50,207
2	October 29	Philadelphia Phillies – 1, New York Yankees − 3	Yankee Stadium	3:25	50,181
3	October 31	New York Yankees – 8, Philadelphia Phillies – 5	Citizens Bank Park	3:25	46,061
4	November 1	New York Yankees – 7, Philadelphia Phillies – 4	Citizens Bank Park	3:25	46,145
5	November 2	New York Yankees – 6, Philadelphia Phillies – 8	Citizens Bank Park	3:26	46,178
6	November 4	Philadelphia Phillies – 3, New York Yankees – 7	Yankee Stadium	3:52	50,315

== Matchups ==
=== Game 1 ===
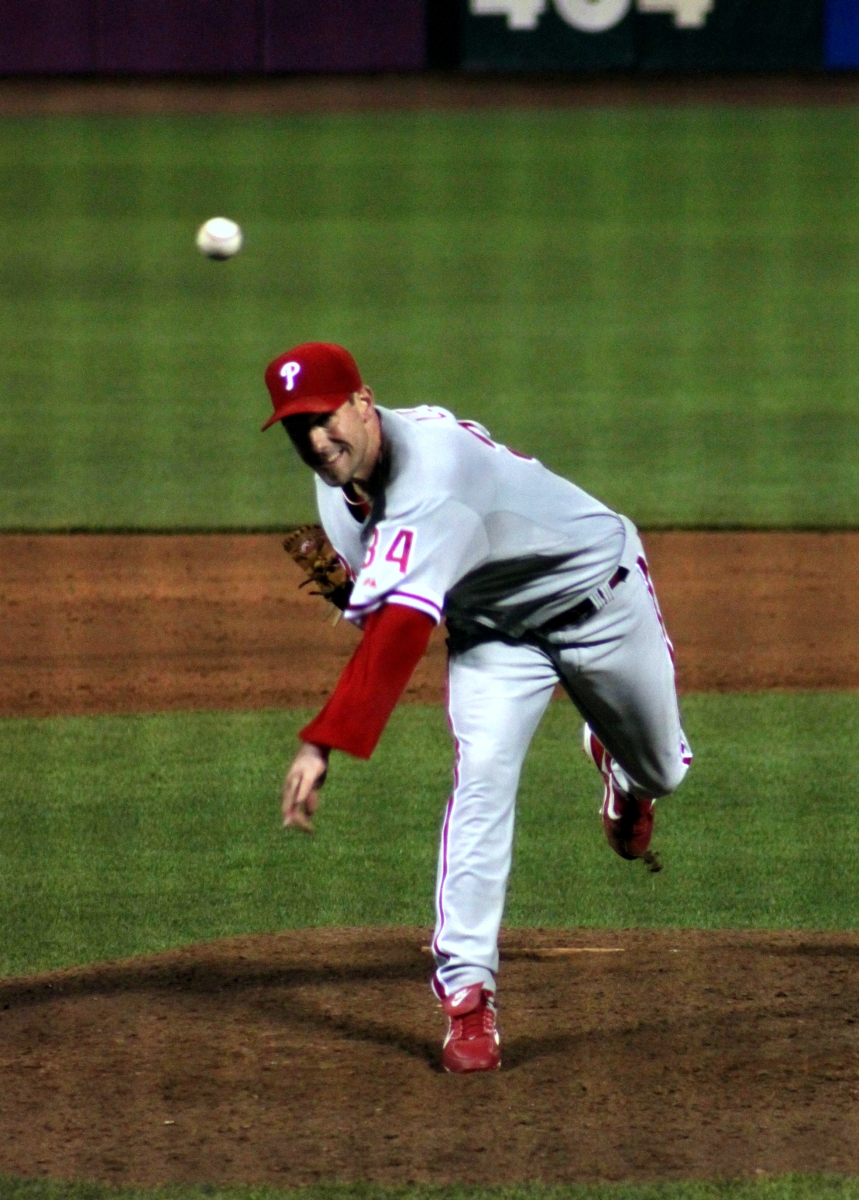
Phillies starting pitcher Cliff Lee, pictured in the 2009 regular season, became the first pitcher to ever throw a postseason series opener complete game against the Yankees without allowing an earned run.

October 28, 2009 7:57 pm (EDT) at Yankee Stadium in Bronx, New York 53 °F (12 °C), chance of rain
Team	1	2	3	4	5	6	7	8	9	R	H	E
Philadelphia	0	0	1	0	0	1	0	2	2	6	9	1
New York	0	0	0	0	0	0	0	0	1	1	6	0
WP: Cliff Lee (1–0) LP: CC Sabathia (0–1); Home runs: PHI: Chase Utley 2 (2); NYY: None; Attendance: 50,207; Boxscore

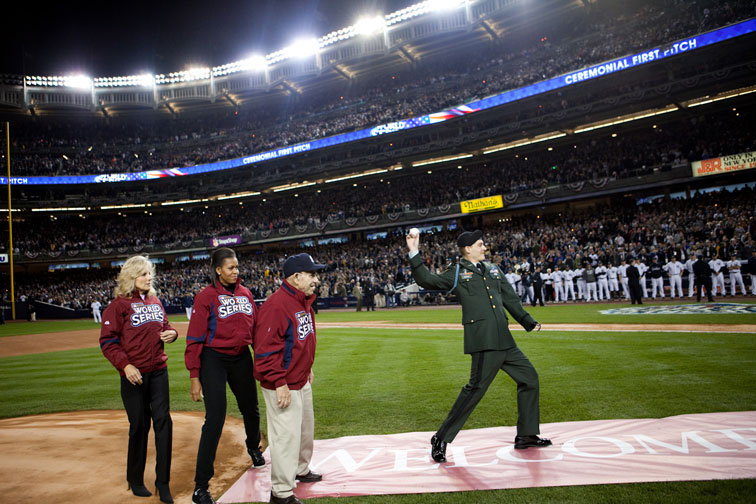
Ceremonial first pitch of the World Series with Michelle Obama, Jill Biden, and Yogi Berra watching

First Lady Michelle Obama and Second Lady Jill Biden escorted former Yankees catcher and World War II veteran Yogi Berra to the mound, where the ceremonial first pitch was thrown by a veteran of the Iraq War. The Phillies' Ryan Howard got the first hit of the 2009 World Series by doubling in the first inning. Howard was stranded in the first and the game was scoreless after two innings. The Phillies scored first with a two-out home run by Chase Utley in the top of the third inning. Through the first five innings, Philadelphia starting pitcher Cliff Lee allowed no runs and three hits, striking out seven Yankees batters. In the top of the sixth, Utley hit another home run to give the Phillies a 2–0 lead. The starting pitchers Lee and CC Sabathia continued to pitch until the top of the eighth when Sabathia was replaced by Phil Hughes. Hughes walked the first two batters and was replaced by Dámaso Marte. Marte got two quick outs and was relieved by David Robertson, who walked Jayson Werth and gave up a two-run single to Raúl Ibañez. The Phillies added two more runs in the ninth with an RBI single by Shane Victorino and an RBI double by Howard. Lee finished with a complete game allowing one unearned run on six hits and striking out ten batters, not walking any of the hitters he faced.

Lee's pitching performance made history in several ways:

- This was the fourth postseason start of Lee's career. In all four starts, he went at least seven innings and gave up no more than one earned run. The only other starting pitcher ever to begin his postseason career with four such starts was Christy Mathewson.
- He was also the first left-handed starter to beat the Yankees in The Bronx to open a World Series since Sandy Koufax in 1963.
- He was the first starting pitcher to throw a complete game without giving up an earned run against the Yankees in Game 1 of a postseason series.
- Lee was the first pitcher ever to strike out at least ten, walk no one, and give up no earned runs in a World Series start.

=== Game 2 ===
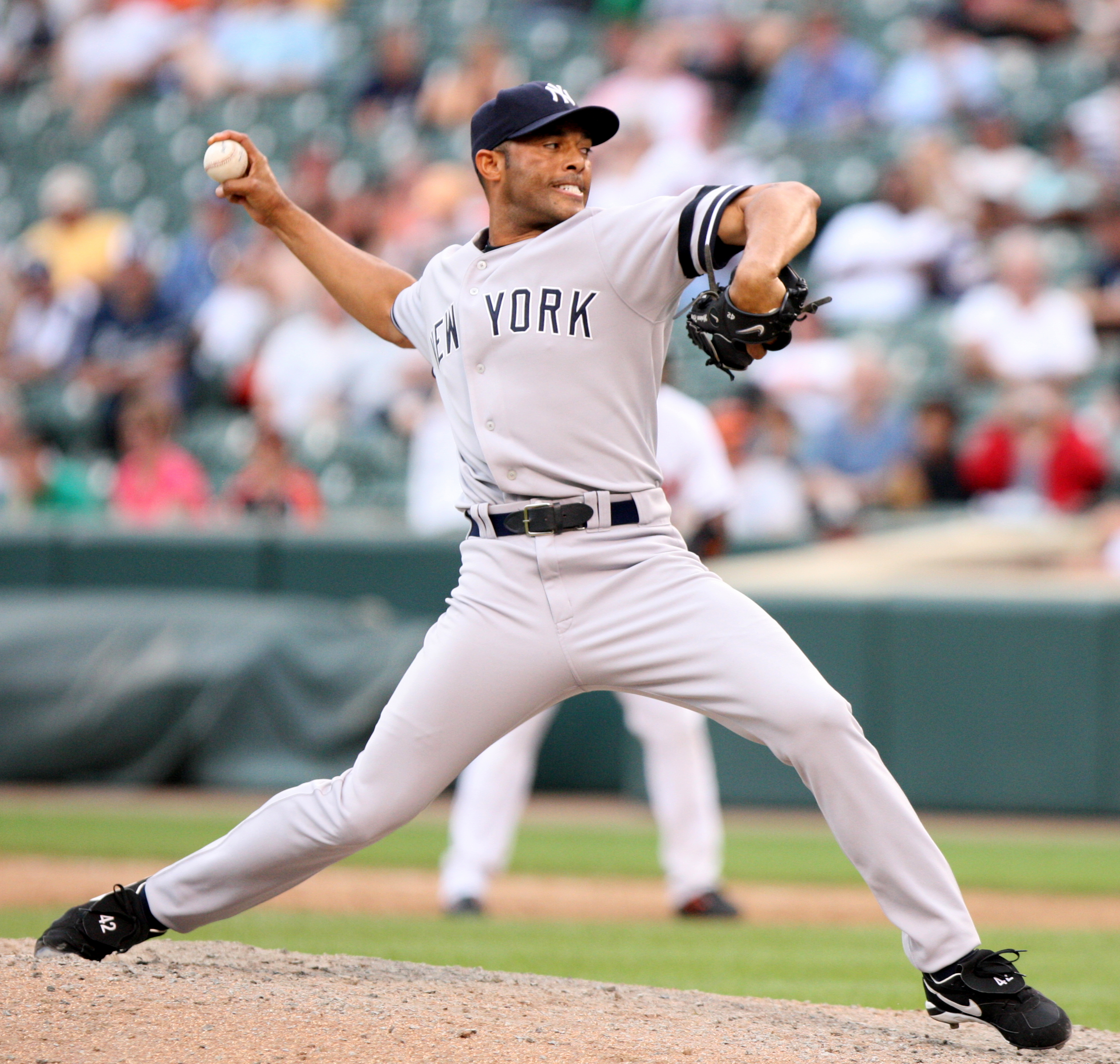
Yankees closer Mariano Rivera, pictured during the 2007 regular season, pitched two scoreless innings in Game 2 for the save.

October 29, 2009 7:57 pm (EDT) at Yankee Stadium in Bronx, New York 52 °F (11 °C), Overcast
Team	1	2	3	4	5	6	7	8	9	R	H	E
Philadelphia	0	1	0	0	0	0	0	0	0	1	6	0
New York	0	0	0	1	0	1	1	0	X	3	8	0
WP: A. J. Burnett (1–0) LP: Pedro Martínez (0–1) Sv: Mariano Rivera (1); Home runs: PHI: None; NYY: Mark Teixeira (1), Hideki Matsui (1); Attendance: 50,181; Boxscore

Prior to the game, Jay-Z and Alicia Keys performed the song "Empire State of Mind" for the Yankee Stadium crowd, while John Legend performed the national anthem. This game marked the first postseason appearance of Pedro Martínez against the Yankees since the 2004 American League Championship Series, when he was with the Boston Red Sox and a part of the two teams' long standing rivalry; it was also the second-ever World Series start that Martínez made. There was much media interest in Martínez's "return to Yankee Stadium" for Game 2, as he told reporters at a pre-game press conference "When you have 60,000 people chanting your name, waiting for you to throw the ball, you have to consider yourself someone special, someone that really has a purpose out there."

The Phillies scored first for the second game in a row, with Raúl Ibañez hitting a ground rule double and then scoring on a Matt Stairs RBI single off A. J. Burnett in the second inning.

Mark Teixeira tied the game with a home run in the fourth inning, and Hideki Matsui broke the tie in the sixth with another homer. Martínez departed the game after giving up consecutive hits to Jerry Hairston Jr. and Melky Cabrera to start the seventh inning, and reliever Chan Ho Park gave up an RBI single to Jorge Posada. With Cabrera at second base and Posada at first, Johnny Damon hit a low line drive at Phillies first baseman Ryan Howard. Howard grabbed the ball and threw to second where Posada was tagged and called out while standing on the base. First-base umpire Brian Gorman ruled that Howard had caught the ball in the air; thus, the result was an inning-ending double play. Both Posada and Joe Girardi vehemently protested the call, claiming that the batted ball had hit the ground before being caught; however, the umpires did not reverse the call. ESPN reported that Gorman blew the call. This was the first of two calls made by Gorman in Game Two that were heavily criticized.

Burnett left the game after seven innings, having given up one run. He was replaced by Mariano Rivera in the eighth inning. With one out in the eighth, the Phillies put two runners on with a walk to Jimmy Rollins and a single by Shane Victorino. However, Chase Utley grounded into an inning-ending double play ending on a close play at first base. The play was the second disputed call made by umpire Brian Gorman in Game Two. Gorman himself later admitted he missed this call, saying, "on a freeze frame, it looks like there's a little bit of a ball outside [Teixeira's] glove when [Utley] hits the bag." Ultimately, Rivera threw 39 pitches and got six outs for his 38th postseason save, his tenth in World Series play.

Burnett earned the win in Game Two.

=== Game 3 ===
October 31, 2009 9:17 pm (EDT) at Citizens Bank Park in Philadelphia, Pennsylvania 69 °F (21 °C), Occasional shower
Team	1	2	3	4	5	6	7	8	9	R	H	E
New York	0	0	0	2	3	1	1	1	0	8	8	1
Philadelphia	0	3	0	0	0	1	0	0	1	5	6	0
WP: Andy Pettitte (1–0) LP: Cole Hamels (0–1); Home runs: NYY: Alex Rodriguez (1), Nick Swisher (1), Hideki Matsui (2); PHI: Jayson Werth 2 (2), Carlos Ruiz (1); Attendance: 46,061; Boxscore

The start of the game was postponed 80 minutes due to a rain delay, pushing the start time to 9:17 p.m. Amber Riley, accompanied by cast members of the television series Glee (Jenna Ushkowitz. Chris Colfer, Lea Michele, Cory Monteith, Mark Salling, Dianna Agron, and Kevin McHale) performed the national anthem, as part of a ceremony featuring a large American flag and several members of the armed services. The Phillies scored first with Jayson Werth's lead-off home run, which was followed by a bases-loaded walk and a sacrifice fly to make the score 3–0 in the bottom of the second inning. Following Mark Teixeira's walk in the top of the fourth inning, Alex Rodriguez hit a deep ball down the right field line. It was originally ruled a double so Teixeira held at third base. The play was reviewed using MLB instant replay, which revealed that the ball had struck a camera sticking over the top of the wall, so the ball was ruled a two-run home run, giving Rodriguez his first World Series hit. This was the first home run reviewed by instant replay in postseason play. Specifically, the ball hit a camera owned by Fox and MLB which extended slightly over the right field wall. The camera was moved back for Game 4 such that its lens was in line with the wall. Coincidentally, Alex Rodriguez also had the first regular season home run reviewed by replay.

Nick Swisher opened the top of the fifth inning with a double and scored on a single to center field by Andy Pettitte. This was Pettitte's first career postseason RBI and the first RBI by a Yankees pitcher in a World Series since Jim Bouton in 1964. Derek Jeter followed Pettitte with another single, and both runners scored on a two-run double by Johnny Damon. Cole Hamels then walked Teixeira and was relieved by J. A. Happ. Happ closed out the fifth without allowing further scoring, but Nick Swisher added to the Yankees lead with a home run off of him in the sixth. Werth hit his second home run of the game leading off the bottom of the sixth to close the Yankees lead to 6–4, becoming the second Phillies player to hit multiple home runs in this World Series.

Chad Durbin relieved Happ in the top of the seventh. He walked Johnny Damon, who then stole second base. Rodriguez was then hit by a pitch, and Damon scored on a single by Jorge Posada. Joba Chamberlain relieved Pettitte in the bottom of the seventh and retired the side in order. Brett Myers retired the first two batters in the top of the eighth, but Hideki Matsui then hit a home run pinch hitting for Chamberlain. Phil Hughes pitched a third of an inning in the bottom of the ninth and allowed a solo home run to Carlos Ruiz before being relieved by Mariano Rivera. Rivera closed out the game, throwing just five pitches to record the final two outs. This game was Pettitte's 17th career postseason win, extending his MLB record.

=== Game 4 ===
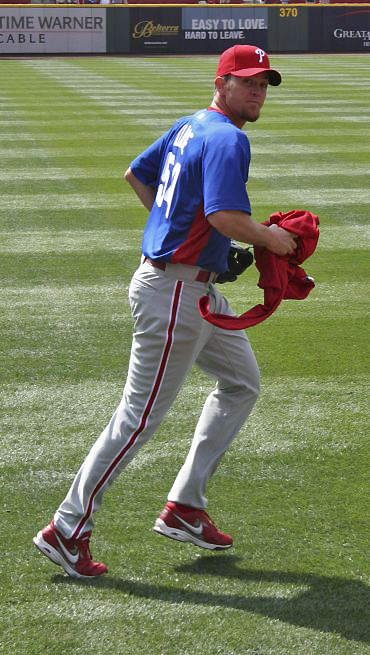
Phillies closer Brad Lidge, pictured during the 2008 regular season, allowed three runs in the ninth inning of a tied Game 4 and took the loss.

November 1, 2009 8:20 pm (EST) at Citizens Bank Park in Philadelphia, Pennsylvania 52 °F (11 °C), Mostly cloudy
Team	1	2	3	4	5	6	7	8	9	R	H	E
New York	2	0	0	0	2	0	0	0	3	7	9	1
Philadelphia	1	0	0	1	0	0	1	1	0	4	8	1
WP: Joba Chamberlain (1–0) LP: Brad Lidge (0–1) Sv: Mariano Rivera (2); Home runs: NYY: None; PHI: Chase Utley (3), Pedro Feliz (1); Attendance: 46,145; Boxscore

This game marked the second time the World Series was held during November. Prior to the start of the game, Derek Jeter and Albert Pujols were named winners of the Hank Aaron Award for their offensive performances in 2009. This was the first game to test manager Joe Girardi's decision to use a three-man starting rotation, as CC Sabathia started the game on three days rest, a shorter period than he normally got during the regular season. Jeter led the game off with a single and advanced to third base on a double by Johnny Damon. Jeter scored via a Mark Teixeira ground out and Alex Rodriguez was hit by a pitch. Rodriguez was hit twice the night before and the umpires issued warnings to both benches. Jorge Posada then added to the Yankees lead that inning with a sacrifice fly. The Phillies answered quickly, scoring a run on successive doubles by Shane Victorino and Chase Utley in the bottom of the first. Sabathia intentionally walked Jayson Werth, but escaped the inning without further scoring. The Phillies tied the game in the bottom of the fourth as Ryan Howard singled, stole second, and scored on a single by Pedro Feliz. Although the run counted, instant replay of Howard's slide showed that he did not touch home plate. As Sabathia threw to second base, Mike Everitt signaled that Howard was safe due to the attempted play on Feliz. Sabathia then pitched to Carlos Ruiz as part of an intentional walk, therefore losing the right to appeal that Howard missed home.

Nick Swisher walked to lead off the fifth inning and advanced to second on a Melky Cabrera single. Swisher restored the Yankees' lead, scoring on a single by Jeter, and Cabrera added to it by scoring a run on a Damon single. Brett Gardner replaced Cabrera in center field as a defensive substitution in the bottom of the sixth inning after Cabrera left the game due to a hamstring injury. Chan Ho Park relieved Phillies starter Joe Blanton in the seventh and held the Yankees scoreless in that inning. Chase Utley hit his third home run of the series in the bottom of the seventh with two outs, bringing the game to 4–3. Dámaso Marte relieved Sabathia and got the final out of the seventh without further scoring.

Ryan Madson relieved Park in the eighth and allowed a walk and a single but held the Yankees scoreless. Joba Chamberlain replaced Marte in the bottom of the inning. He struck out the first two batters he faced but allowed a game-tying home run to Feliz before closing the inning.

Brad Lidge came into the game for the ninth inning, popping out Matsui and striking out Jeter before surrendering a two-out single to Damon—after a nine-pitch at bat with two strikes and four foul balls. Then, with Teixeira batting, Damon stole second and, on the same play, also stole third as the base was uncovered due to a defensive shift against Teixeira. Several news outlets referred to this as a "mad dash". Some believed that Damon's play caused Lidge to avoid throwing his best pitch—a slider with sharp downward movement—for the rest of the inning, as it risked a wild pitch that would have allowed Damon to score from third base. Teixeira was then hit by a pitch and Rodriguez put the Yankees ahead with a double, scoring Damon. Posada added to that lead with a single that scored Teixeira and Rodriguez, but was thrown out at second to end the inning. Mariano Rivera entered in the bottom of the ninth and saved the game for the Yankees on eight pitches for his second save of the series.

=== Game 5 ===
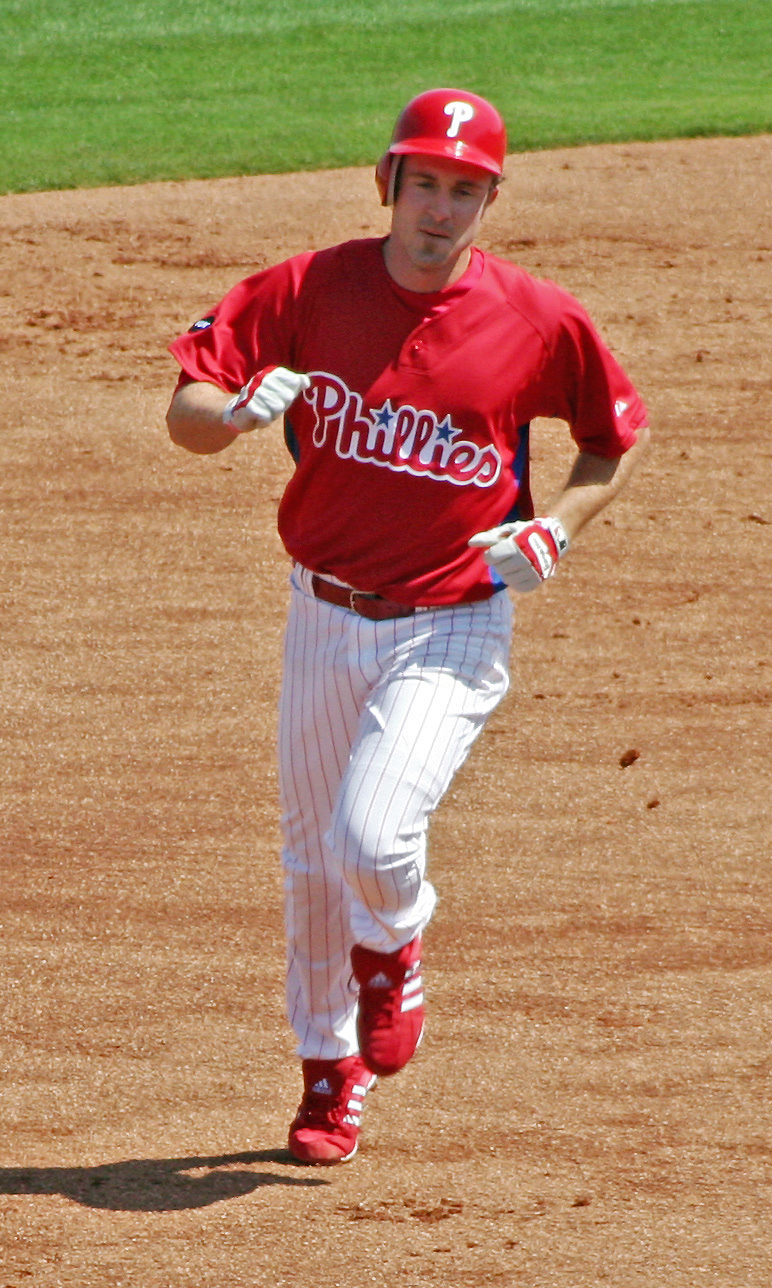
Phillies second baseman Chase Utley, pictured during spring training in 2007, tied a World Series record with five home runs in the series.

November 2, 2009 7:57 pm (EST) at Citizens Bank Park in Philadelphia, Pennsylvania 51 °F (11 °C), cloudy
Team	1	2	3	4	5	6	7	8	9	R	H	E
New York	1	0	0	0	1	0	0	3	1	6	10	0
Philadelphia	3	0	3	0	0	0	2	0	X	8	9	0
WP: Cliff Lee (2–0) LP: A. J. Burnett (1–1) Sv: Ryan Madson (1); Home runs: NYY: None; PHI: Chase Utley 2 (5), Raúl Ibañez (1); Attendance: 46,178; Boxscore

Canadian singer Alanis Morissette sang the national anthem. The Yankees replaced Melky Cabrera on their postseason roster with Ramiro Peña due to his injury in Game 4, while Brett Gardner took Cabrera's place in center field. A. J. Burnett, the Yankees' Game 2 starter, started Game 5 on three days rest, one less than the Phillies' Cliff Lee. The Yankees scored first in the first inning, with Johnny Damon reaching base with a single and then scoring on a two-out double by Alex Rodriguez. The Phillies responded in the bottom of the inning with a single by Jimmy Rollins, Shane Victorino reaching after being hit by a pitch, and finally a three-run home run by Chase Utley to take the lead. The Phillies added to their lead in the third inning with Utley and Ryan Howard drawing walks followed by RBI singles by Jayson Werth and Raúl Ibañez. With no outs in the inning, Burnett was relieved by David Robertson, who allowed another run to score on a Carlos Ruiz ground out.

Robertson held the Phillies scoreless for a second inning in the fourth. Jorge Posada entered as a pinch hitter in the fifth inning for José Molina and grounded out. Eric Hinske then pinch hit for Robertson and walked, advanced to third on a Derek Jeter single, and scored on a ground out by Damon. Alfredo Aceves entered as the new Yankee pitcher in the bottom of the fifth. The first batter he faced, Jayson Werth, hit a deep drive to center field but it was caught for an out by Gardner, who collided with the outfield wall to complete the play. Aceves completed the inning without a run scoring, inducing ground outs from Ibáñez and Ruiz. Phil Coke relieved Aceves in the seventh inning and allowed two Phillies players to tie World Series records. First, Utley tied Reggie Jackson's record for most home runs in a World Series with a home run, his fifth of the series. Coke then struck out Howard, Howard's 12th strikeout in the series, tying Willie Wilson's record for most strikeouts in a World Series. Finally, Coke was driven from the game after allowing another home run, this time to Ibáñez, and was relieved by Phil Hughes.

Victorino was replaced defensively in the eighth inning by Ben Francisco. Lee was driven from the game after allowing a single to Damon, followed by a double by Mark Teixeira, and then a double by Rodriguez that scored both runners. Chan Ho Park relieved Lee and induced a ground out from Nick Swisher, which advanced Rodriguez to third base. Rodriguez scored on a sacrifice fly by Robinson Canó. Ryan Madson entered in the ninth to close the game, allowing a double to Posada and a single to Hideki Matsui without recording an out. Batting with men on first and third base, Jeter grounded into a double play, allowing Posada to score but emptying the bases. Damon singled to bring Teixeira to bat as the potential tying run, but Madson struck him out to record his first World Series save. Members of the news media, such as Gene Wojciechowski, were critical of the three-man starting rotation strategy following Game 3, and contended that Burnett's poor performance was caused by insufficient rest in between starts. However, Burnett had been successful up to this point in such situations, going 4–0 with a 2.33 ERA in four career starts on short rest (less than the normal four days between starts) before this game.

=== Game 6 ===
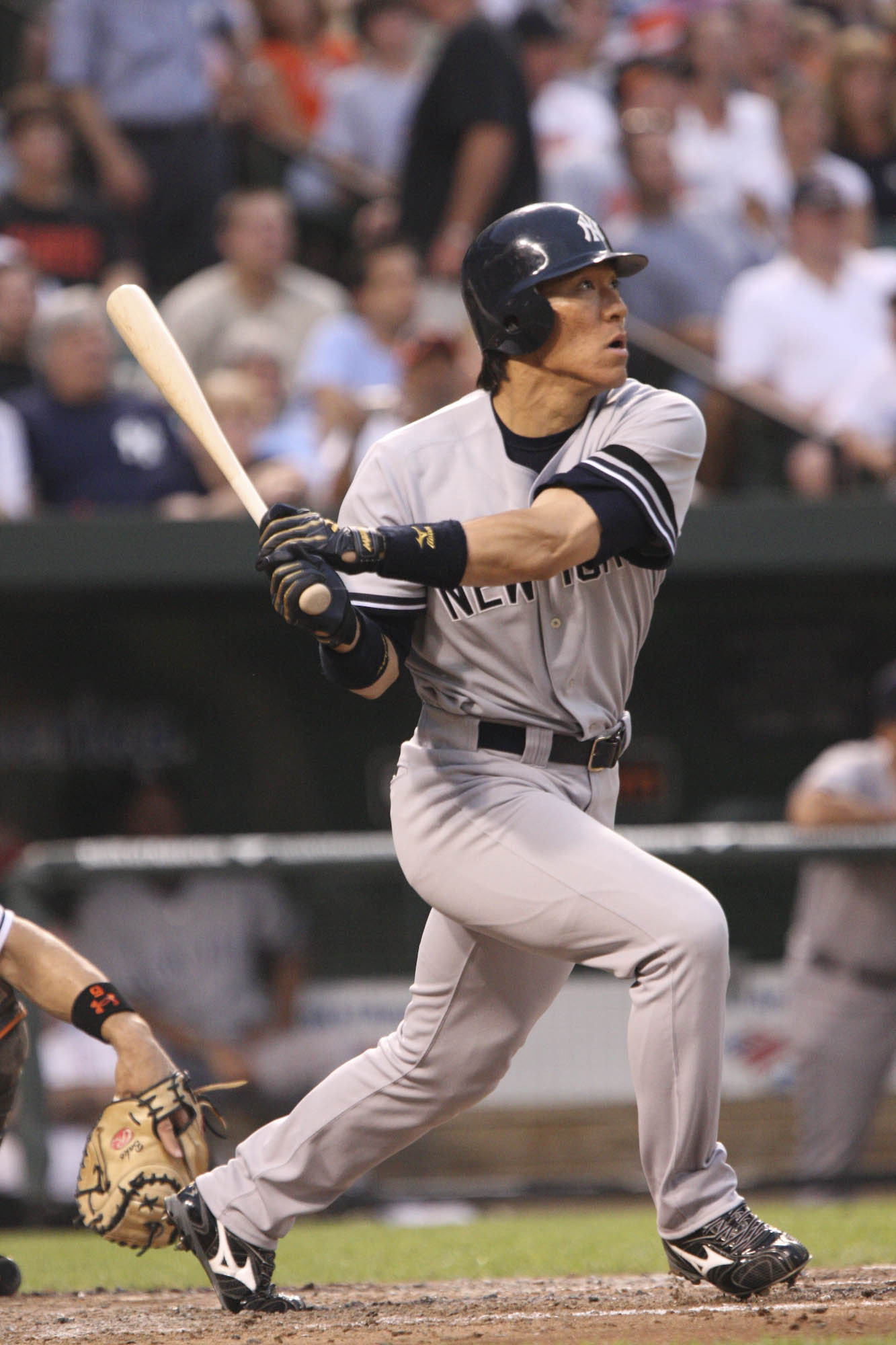
Yankees designated hitter Hideki Matsui, pictured here in the 2007 regular season, tied a World Series record for most RBIs in a single game and won the World Series MVP award.

November 4, 2009 7:57 pm (EST) at Yankee Stadium in Bronx, New York 50 °F (10 °C), Clear
Team	1	2	3	4	5	6	7	8	9	R	H	E
Philadelphia	0	0	1	0	0	2	0	0	0	3	6	0
New York	0	2	2	0	3	0	0	0	X	7	8	0
WP: Andy Pettitte (2–0) LP: Pedro Martínez (0–2); Home runs: PHI: Ryan Howard (1); NYY: Hideki Matsui (3); Attendance: 50,315; Boxscore

This game was the first Game 6 in a World Series since the 2003 World Series six years earlier, the longest such gap in the history of the World Series. Mary J. Blige, a Bronx native, performed "The Star-Spangled Banner". Andy Pettitte started on three days rest, the third straight game in which the Yankees fielded a pitcher on short rest. The Phillies started Pedro Martínez, who called himself and opposing pitcher Andy Pettitte "old goats" and acknowledged that Red Sox fans were rooting for him: "I know that they don't like the Yankees to win, not even in Nintendo games."

The Yankees scored first with an Alex Rodriguez walk opening the bottom of the second inning followed by a two-run home run by designated hitter Hideki Matsui. The Phillies quickly responded with a triple by Carlos Ruiz who then scored on a sacrifice fly from Jimmy Rollins in the top of the third. Matsui answered back, adding to the Yankees lead again with a single with the bases loaded in the bottom of the third, scoring Derek Jeter and Johnny Damon. Damon, injured running the bases while scoring, was replaced defensively in the top of the fourth by Jerry Hairston Jr.

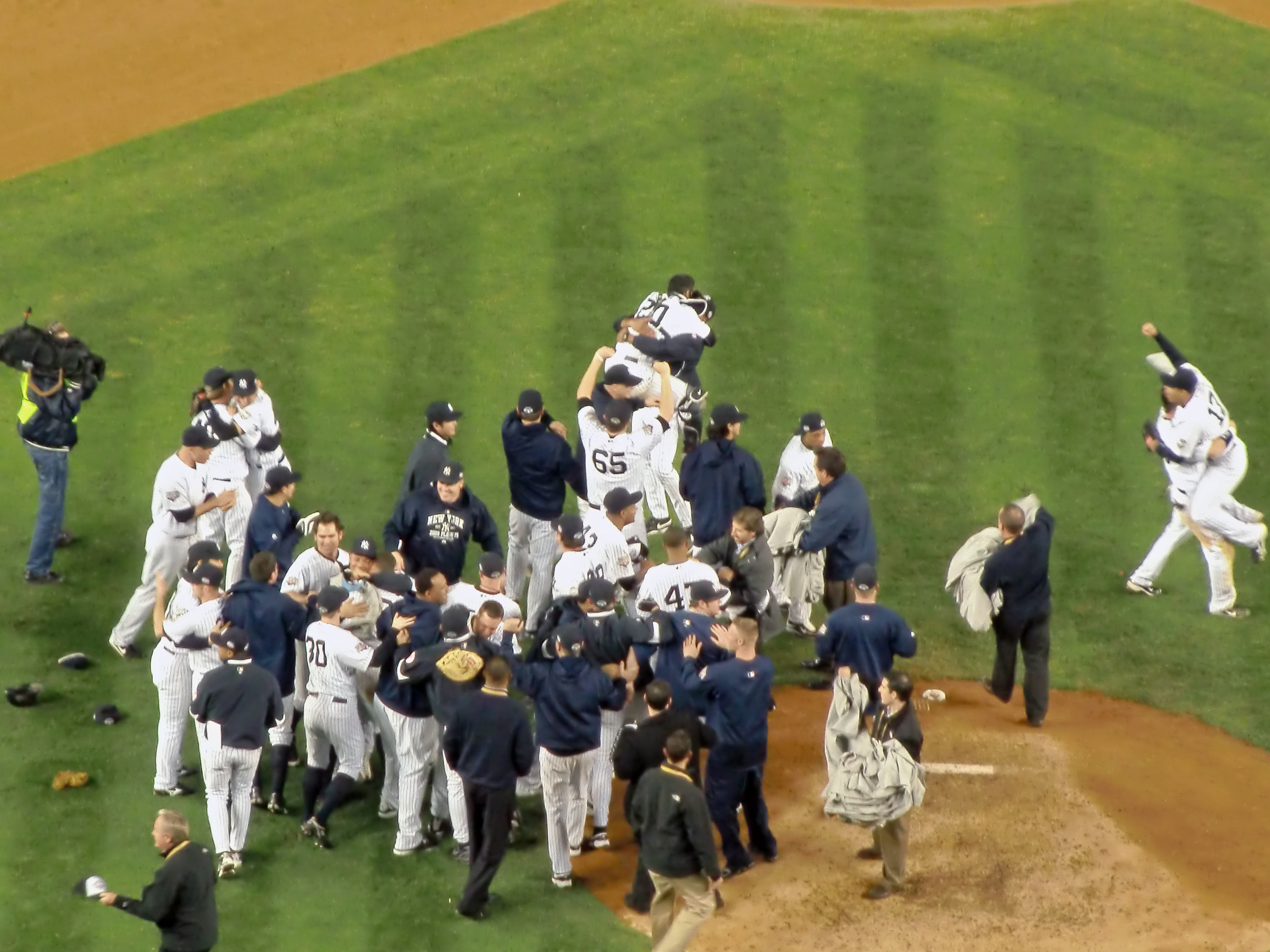
The Yankees celebrate their 7–3 win and the franchise's 27th World Series championship.

Phillies starter Pedro Martínez was removed after allowing four runs in four innings, relieved in the fifth by Chad Durbin. Durbin allowed a ground rule double to Jeter, who advanced to third on a sacrifice bunt by Hairston and scored on a single by Mark Teixeira. Durbin then hit Rodriguez with a pitch and was relieved by J. A. Happ after recording just one out. Happ allowed a two-run double to Matsui, his fifth and sixth RBI of the game, which tied a World Series record for most RBI in a single game set by Bobby Richardson in the 1960 World Series.

The Phillies made the game closer in the top of the sixth inning, as Chase Utley drew a walk and Ryan Howard followed him with a two-run home run, bringing the score to 7–3. After Raúl Ibañez hit a double into right field, Joba Chamberlain relieved Andy Pettitte and closed the sixth without allowing the Phillies to score. Chan Ho Park came in for Happ, ending any Yankees threat that inning. Chamberlain was relieved by Dámaso Marte in the top of the seventh after allowing two baserunners, but Marte struck out Utley to end the inning scoreless. After Park allowed a single to Rodriguez, Scott Eyre replaced him. Eyre allowed Rodriguez to steal second and intentionally walked Jorge Posada but escaped the inning without allowing a run.

Marte recorded one out, a strikeout of Howard, in the top of the eighth inning. With it Howard set a new World Series record for most strikeouts by a hitter in a single series with a total of 13. After the out, Marte was relieved by Yankees closer Mariano Rivera in a non-save situation. Rivera allowed a double to Ibáñez, but no runs, in the eighth. After retiring the first two batters in the eighth, Eyre gave way to Ryan Madson, who allowed a single to Jeter before ending the bottom of the eighth inning. Matt Stairs led off the ninth as a pinch hitter, but lined out. Ruiz worked a walk from Rivera, but successive outs by Rollins and Victorino ended the game 7–3 to clinch the World Series for the Yankees. Pettitte added to his own record for most playoff wins, bringing his career total to 18.

== Composite line score ==
2009 World Series (4–2): New York Yankees (AL) beat Philadelphia Phillies (NL).

Team	1	2	3	4	5	6	7	8	9	R	H	E
Philadelphia Phillies	4	4	5	1	0	4	3	3	3	27	44	2
New York Yankees	3	2	2	3	9	2	2	4	5	32	49	2
Total attendance: 289,087 Average attendance: 48,181; Winning player's share: $350,029.99 Losing player's share: $265,357.50

== Broadcasting ==
For the tenth consecutive year in the United States, Fox Sports televised the Series. Joe Buck called play-by-play and Tim McCarver provided analysis. The Series was also broadcast on ESPN Radio, with Jon Miller and Joe Morgan calling the action. Fox Sports en Español also broadcast the Series for the US Spanish-speaking audience. The flagship radio stations of the respective teams broadcast all Series games with their local announcers. In Philadelphia, WPHT carried the Phillies' English-language broadcasts, with Scott Franzke, Larry Andersen, Tom McCarthy, Gary Matthews, and Chris Wheeler announcing, while WUBA aired the team's Spanish broadcasts. In New York, WCBS-AM carried the Yankees' English broadcasts with John Sterling and Suzyn Waldman announcing. This broadcast made Waldman the first woman to announce a World Series game on radio. XM Satellite Radio offered multiple feeds of each game to its subscribers.

== Ratings ==
The 2009 World Series earned high television ratings. Game 1 attracted 19.5 million viewers, second only to the opening of the 2004 World Series for a series opener since 2000 and 29% higher than 2008's opening game. Game 4 produced the highest total viewership of the series with 22.8 million viewers, the highest for any World Series game since 2004 and the highest for a "non-decisive Game 4" since 2001. At 11.7 overall, the 2009 World Series was at the time the highest rated World Series since 2004 and one of the only World Series to average double digits since 2007, the other being the 2016 World Series.

Game	Ratings (households)	Share (households)	American audience (in millions)
1	11.9	19	19.5
2	11.7	19	18.9
3	9.1	18	15.4
4	13.5	22	22.8
5	10.6	16	17.1
6	13.4	22	22.3

== Series overview and aftermath ==
Many players with both teams won awards for their performances during the 2009 season. Teixeira and Jeter each won a Gold Glove and Silver Slugger Award; Jimmy Rollins and Shane Victorino won Gold Gloves, as well; and Chase Utley won a Silver Slugger Award. Rivera was named the 2009 DHL Delivery Man of the Year, as well as Sporting News' Pro Athlete of the Year. Along with the Hank Aaron Award announced before Game 4, Jeter won the Roberto Clemente Award and was named Sports Illustrated's Sportsman of the Year for 2009. Matsui won the World Series MVP for his play, becoming the first Japanese player and first full-time designated hitter to win the award. He joined 1987 and 1991 championship Minnesota Twins player Dan Gladden as members of the 1994 championship-winning Yomiuri Giants team who have won championships in North America and Japan. Several items related to the series were sent to the National Baseball Hall of Fame and Museum including bats from Jeter and Matsui; caps from Rivera, Lee, and Pettitte; and Johnny Damon's cleats.

This was the last World Series between two teams from the Eastern Time Zone (EST).

=== Yankees ===
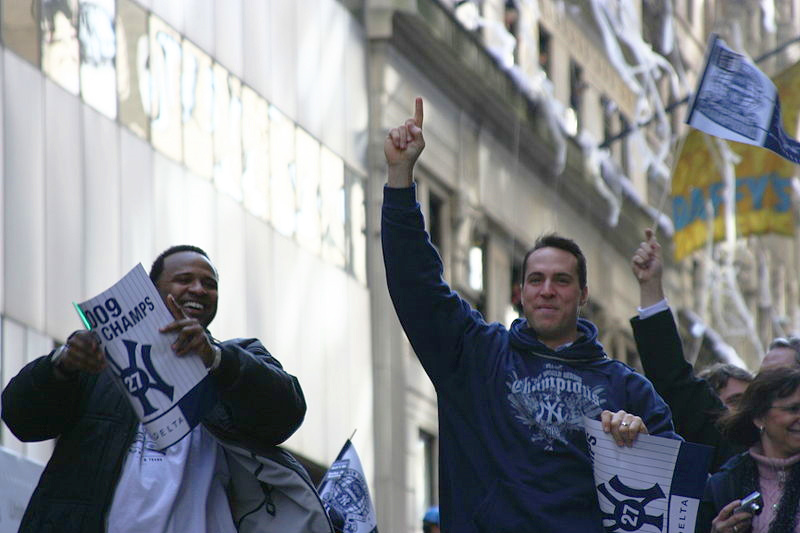
CC Sabathia and Mark Teixeira during the victory parade

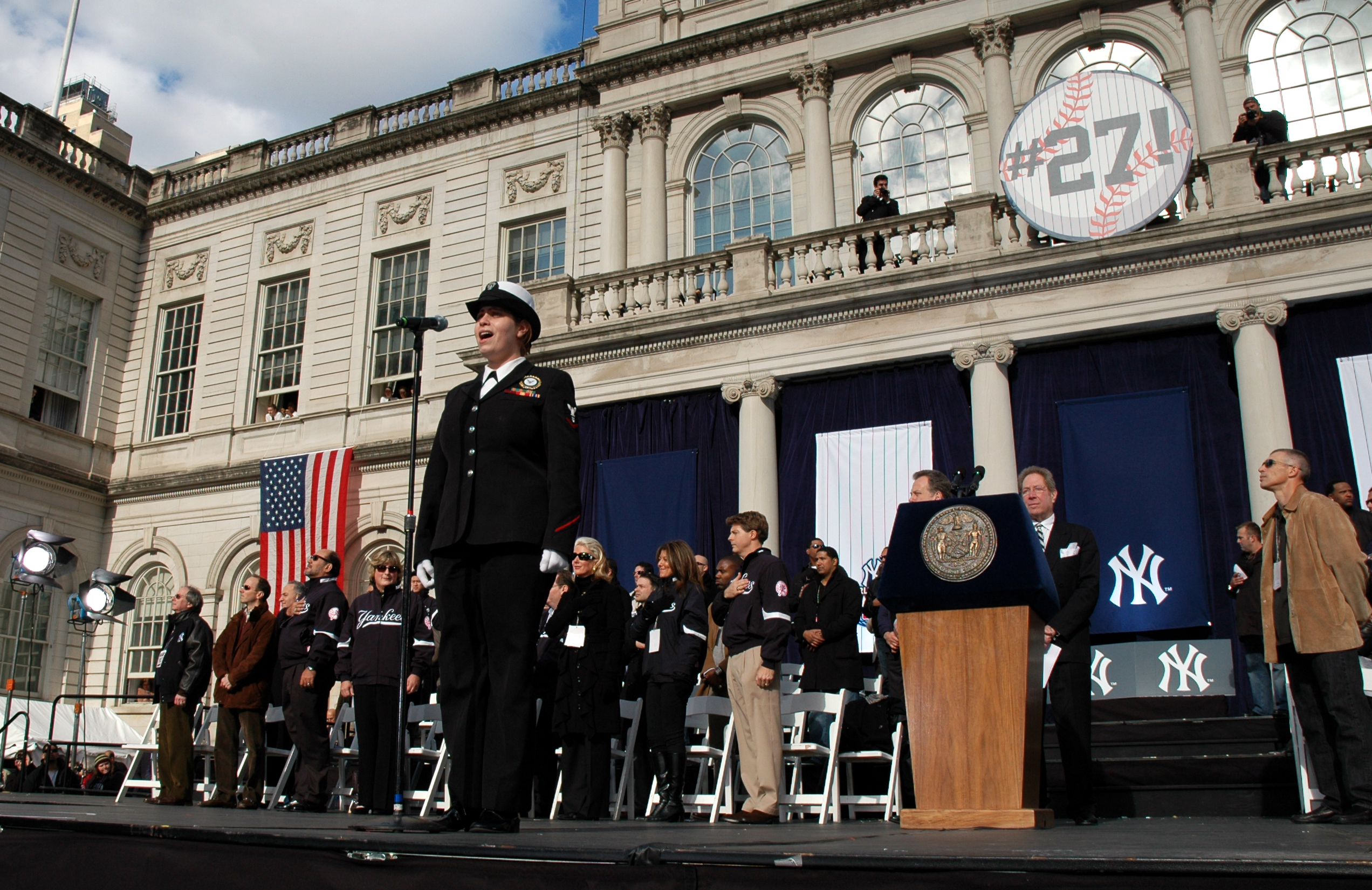
Ticker-tape parade at New York City Hall

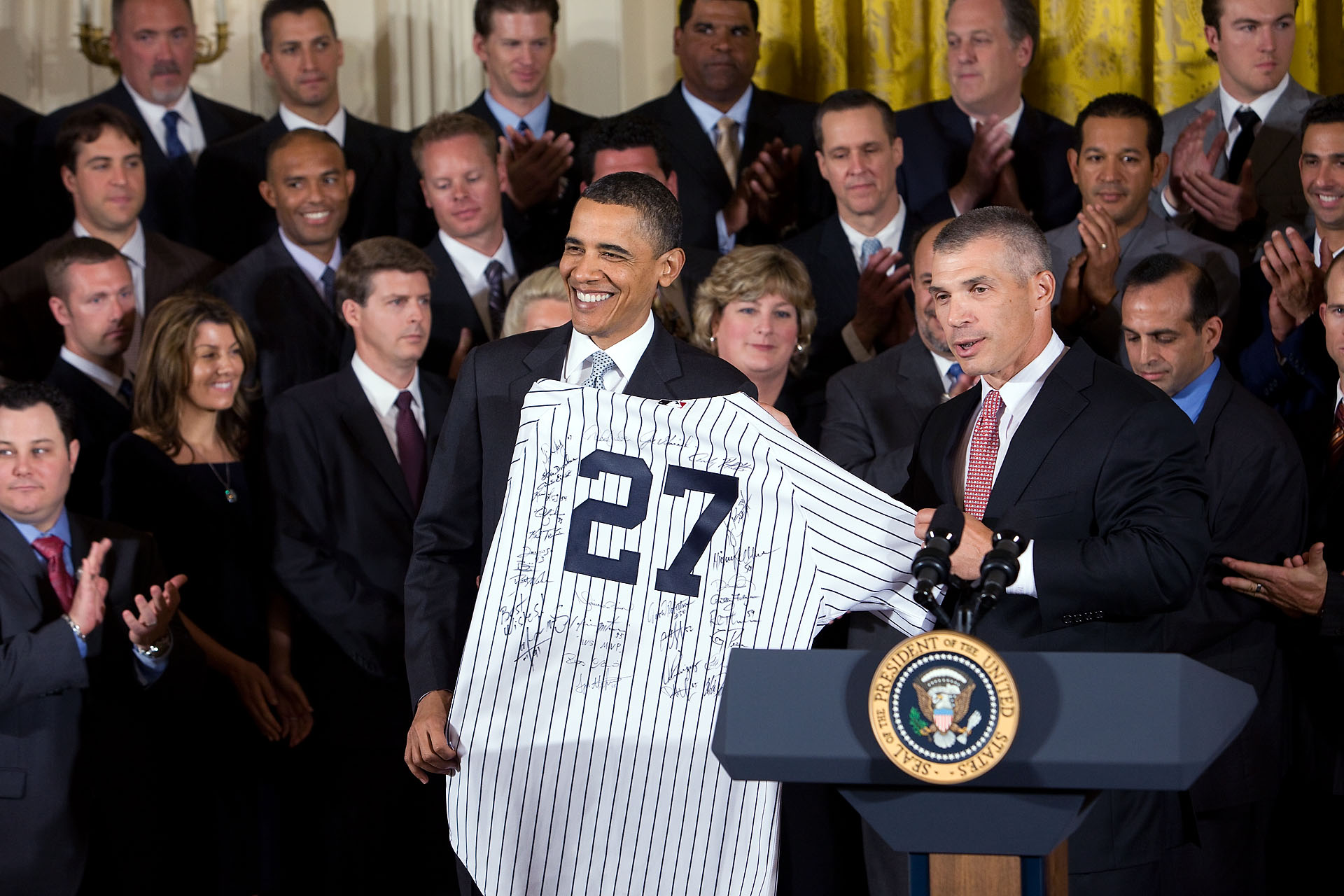
President Barack Obama meets with the 2009 World Series champion New York Yankees at the White House.

The series win brought the Yankees' franchise championship total to 27, more than any other North American professional sports franchise. This championship came in the Yankees' first year in their new stadium. They had also won the 1923 World Series, the opening year of the previous Yankee Stadium. The victory was noted by some sportswriters as a personal success for Alex Rodriguez, winning his first and only world championship and succeeding in the playoffs where some had previously claimed he was a "choker and a loser". Prior to this series, Rodriguez had appeared in 2,166 regular season games without a World Series appearance, then the second-most among active players to Ken Griffey Jr.

The Yankees' victory was credited to a number of different sources. Many players drew praise for their performances, including Series MVP Hideki Matsui; free agents signed the previous offseason including Mark Teixeira, CC Sabathia, and A. J. Burnett; and the so-called "Core Four" of Derek Jeter, Mariano Rivera, Andy Pettitte, and Jorge Posada, who had all played a large role in the Yankees' past success in the 1990s. Manager Joe Girardi was also credited for his management of the team, particularly in his decision to use only three starting pitchers in the Yankees postseason starting rotation. The Yankees were the first team to use only three starters in a World Series since the San Diego Padres in the 1998 Series.

Several members of the Yankees franchise dedicated the World Series in part to team owner George Steinbrenner, who had recently stepped back from his once prominent position with the team. Steinbrenner died on the day of the All-Star Game the following season at the age of 80. On November 6, a victory parade took place for the Yankees in the "Canyon of Heroes" in Manhattan, New York City. The Yankees sent a group of players, coach Tony Peña, and team Senior Vice President Felix Lopez with the Commissioner's Trophy to the Dominican Republic in early January 2010 to meet with President Leonel Fernández. Most of the 2009 Yankees received their championship rings on Opening Day the next season. Matsui was on the Angels in 2010 and when the Angels played their first series of the season in the Bronx, the Yankees home opener, they presented him with his ring. They also visited U.S. President Barack Obama in the White House in April 2010, presenting him with a signed jersey.

The Yankees returned to the playoffs the following season, as the wild card. They lost to the Texas Rangers in the 2010 ALCS; which included an 8–0 shutout in Yankee Stadium by former Phillie ace Cliff Lee; it was Lee's seventh straight postseason win, which included three victories against the Yankees (two as a Phillie in the 2009 World Series, and in 2010 during the ALCS). The Yankees tried to acquire Lee from the Seattle Mariners during the 2010 season, but a potential trade fell through. The Yankees returned to the American League Championship Series in 2012, 2017, 2019, and 2022, and 2024 losing the first four times and becoming the first team to lose five straight LCS, ultimately winning in 2024, but would go on to lose the World Series to the Dodgers. With the losses by the Mets in 2015 and the Yankees in 2024, this remains the most recent World Series championship by a team from New York City, and is the most recent major professional sports championship won by a New York City-based team at their home venue.

=== Phillies ===
Following Game 4, after the Yankees took a 3–1 series lead, The Philadelphia Inquirer accidentally printed a three-quarters-page Macy's advertisement congratulating the Phillies for winning the World Series, along with a picture of a Phillies championship T-shirt. The newspaper subsequently apologized for the mistake.

Lee Jenkins of Sports Illustrated attributed Philadelphia's loss to a lack of pitching depth, noting that three different Yankees starters managed to win games in the series, while only Cliff Lee won games for the Phillies. The Phillies' 2008 postseason star pitchers, starter Cole Hamels and closer Brad Lidge, struggled in their only appearances of the 2009 World Series. The Phillies bullpen which did well in the NLCS performed poorly in the World Series, allowing seven runs in just 11 2/3 innings with a 5.40 ERA. Jorge Arangure Jr. of ESPN partially attributed the Phillies' loss to their lack of offensive production, citing the team's .227 batting average in the World Series. Only Chase Utley performed well with 5 home runs and 22 of the Phillies' 90 bases, while Shane Victorino and Jimmy Rollins struggled at the plate, and Ryan Howard struck out a record 13 times in the World Series after his NLCS MVP performance.

The Phillies swapped ace pitchers, acquiring Roy Halladay from Toronto and simultaneously sending Cliff Lee to Seattle. Despite this, the Phillies were odds on favorite to win their third pennant in a row in 2010. However, they were instead upset by the eventual World Series champion San Francisco Giants in the National League Championship Series in six games. They would reacquire Cliff Lee and trade for Roy Oswalt in the 2010 off-season, which formed a "Four Aces" rotation of Halladay, Hamels, Lee, and Oswalt. They won 102 games in 2011, but were again upset by an eventual World Series champion, the St. Louis Cardinals, in the National League Division Series in five games. Afterwards, they would enter a long dry spell of postseason baseball and not make another appearance until their 2022 season.

2009 Yankees third base coach Rob Thomson later managed the Phillies from 2022–2026.

=== David Paterson ticket scandal ===
Among those in attendance during Game 1 was New York Governor David Paterson, whose party had five tickets behind home plate. On March 3, 2010, the New York Commission on Public Integrity found that Paterson had violated state laws concerning gifts to public officials, and that he lied under oath to the commission about his intent to pay for the tickets. The commission further found that Paterson used his position to solicit and receive the five tickets—valued at US$425 each—free of charge from the Yankees, that he had never intended to pay for the tickets despite testimony to the contrary, and that he or a person acting on his behalf wrote a backdated check to pay for them only after scrutiny in the case arose. The Commission ultimately fined Paterson $62,125 for his actions.

== See also ==
- 2009 Asia Series
- 2009 Japan Series
- 2009 Korean Series
