= Bickle =

Bickle is an English surname. Notable people with this name include:

- Rich Bickle (born 1961), American former professional stock car racing driver
- Mike Bickle
- Berry Bickle, Zimbabwean artist
- Penny Bickle, British archaeologist and academic
- Robert Bickle (1929–1974), American boxer
- Trevor Bickle (born 1943), Australian pole vaulter
- Travis Bickle
- Michael Bickle (born 1948), British geophysicist
- Thomas A. Bickle (born 1940), British/Swiss microbiologist
- Lois Moyes Bickle (1881–1952), Canadian tennis player
- Mike Bickle (minister) (born 1955), American writer and priest
- Mike Bickle (footballer) (1944–2023), English footballer
- Phyllis Bickle (1915–2002), British actress
- Purvis Bickle
- Caitlin Bickle (born 2000), American professional basketball player

== Other ==
- Jesse C. Bickle House
- Bickle Knob

== See also ==
- Bickley (disambiguation)
