= Bickler =

Bickler is a surname. Notable people with the surname include:

- Dave Bickler (born 1953), American singer
- Jacob Bickler (1849–1902), German-born American scholar and educator

== See also ==
- Bickle
