= John Bickley =

John Bickley may refer to:

- John Bickley (cricketer) (1819–1866), English cricketer
- John Bickley (Huntingdon MP), English Member of Parliament for Huntingdon in the 15th century
- John Bickley (Stafford MP), English Member of Parliament for Stafford in the 16th century
