= Mike Bickle =

Mike Bickle may refer to:

- Mike Bickle (minister) (born 1955), American evangelical Christian leader
- Mike Bickle (footballer) (1944–2023), English footballer
- Michael Bickle (born 1948), British Earth scientist
