= Bickleigh =

Bickleigh may refer to the following places in Devon, England:

- Bickleigh, Mid Devon, a village near Tiverton
  - Bickleigh Castle
- Bickleigh, South Hams, a village near Plymouth

== See also ==
- Bickley (disambiguation)
