= Richard Ernsberger Jr. =

American journalist and author

Richard Ernsberger Jr. is a journalist and author of non-fiction.

== Education ==
Ernsberger received his undergraduate degree from the University of Tennessee and master's degree in journalism from Columbia University.

== Career ==
He spent 20 years as a writer, correspondent, and senior editor at Newsweek. Ernsberger was also a former editor of Virginia Living Magazine.

== Selected works ==
- Lynch, Allen J., and Richard Ernsberger. Zero to Hero: From Bullied Kid to Warrior. Chicago: Pritzker Military Museum & Library, 2019. ISBN 0998968927
- Kershaw, Alex, Richard Ernsberger, and Jennifer N. Pritzker. The General: William Levine, Citizen Soldier and Liberator. Chicago: Pritzker Military Museum & Library, 2016. ISBN 9780989792882
- Calhoun, Jim, and Richard Ernsberger. A Passion to Lead: Seven Leadership Secrets for Success in Business, Sports, and Life. New York: St. Martin's Griffin, 2008. ISBN 9780312384661
- Ernsberger, Richard. God, Pepsi, and Groovin' on the High Side: Tales from the NASCAR Circuit. New York: M. Evans and Co, 2003. ISBN 0871319969
- Ernsberger, Richard. Bragging Rights: A Season Inside the SEC, Football's Toughest Conference. New York: M. Evans and Co, 2000. ISBN 0871319268

== Personal life ==
Ernsberger is married and has a daughter.
