= Defensive substitution =

Substitute fielder in baseball or softball

A defensive substitution in the game of baseball occurs when a currently non-playing player is placed into the field in place of another player, typically due either to injury or the appearance of a pinch hitter.

In the American League, a pinch hitter is usually substituted for the position player in whose place he batted (although another common substitution is pinch-hitting a utility infielder for a second baseman and subsequently switching him for the shortstop in the field while moving the shortstop over to the now-vacant second base position). In the National League (which, until 2022, did not use the designated hitter rule), pinch hitters sometimes bat for pitchers. However, another common pitcher-substitution strategy in the NL is the double switch, in which a pitching change is coupled with a pinch-hitter who is also defensively substituted for a second player.
