= Stephen Wallace Taylor =

American historian

Stephen Wallace Taylor (born 1965) is an American historian and former chair of the Department of History and Political Science at Middle Georgia State University, in Macon, Georgia.

Taylor is the author of The New South's New Frontier: A Social History of Economic Development in Southwestern North Carolina (New Perspectives on the History of the South), released in 2001, which one reviewer called "a concise and provocative economic history." Taylor has presented his research to national and international scholarly audiences, including the Organization of American Historians, the American Studies Association, the American Society for Environmental History, the Appalachian Studies Association, and the Southern Historical Association. His current research focuses on federal environmental policy and the uses of technology in the Great Smoky Mountains.

His other published research includes From Tomato Fields to Tourists: the Development of Hilton Head Island, (with Margaret A. Shannon) in Richard Starnes, ed., Southern Journeys: Tourism, History and Culture in the Modern South (University of Alabama Press, 2003), Citizens against Wilderness: Environmentalism and the Politics of Marginalization in the Great Smoky Mountains” in Heather Goodall, Paul Rosier, and Sylvia Washington, eds., Echoes from the Poisoned Well (Lexington Books/Rowman and Littlefield, 2006), and Technocracy on the March: The Tennessee Valley Authority and the Promotion of Technology, 1943-1982, in Susanna Delfino and Michele Gillespie, eds., Technology, Innovation, and Southern Industrialization: From the Antebellum Age to the Computer Age (University of Missouri Press, 2008).

Taylor received his Ph.D. in History at the University of Tennessee, in Knoxville, Tennessee. His doctoral dissertation, Building the Back of Beyond: Government Authority, Community Life and Economic Development in the Upper Little Tennessee Valley, 1880-1992 was the winner of the King Award for Best Dissertation in Southern History.

He has specific interests in history of tourism and economic development, especially the socioeconomic history of the American South. Taylor’s general research areas include American Studies; Business and Commerce History; Environmental / Rural / Agricultural History / Geography; Labor History / Studies; State and Local History / Museums;Teaching;U.S. History and Culture; and African-American Studies.

Taylor lent his knowledge to and was featured in a television documentary called Hillbilly: The Real Story that aired on The History Channel and was hosted by Billy Ray Cyrus.
