= Penny Bickle =

British archaeologist and academic

Penny Bickle is Professor of Funerary Archaeology at the University of York and her research focuses on daily routine in the Neolithic period.

== Research ==
Bickle researches life in the Neolithic period. She is Principal Investigator for the Counter Culture project, which investigates social diversity in central Europe across one thousand years of the Neolithic period.

She was an adviser on Consuming Prehistory project, which examined food consumption at Stonehenge. She was featured on BBC Radio 3 discussing the importance that finds of pig bones could have for the site. She has researched the role that dairy played in prehistoric diet, and collaborated on the NeoMilk Project which examined the role of cattle and dairy products in Neolithic Europe.

The role of gender in prehistoric societies is a research interest for Bickle, on the differences between male-sexed and female-sexed bodies in Linearbandkeramik (LBK) culture. This research includes examining isotopic, archaeological and osteological data from Moravia and western Slovakia. She has also examined ageing and childhood in the LBK culture and how it intersects with social identity. Bickle led a research project examining the Neolithic at Wildmore Fen, Lincolnshire.

Bickle is also interested in different theoretical approaches to archaeology. Bickle wrote the entry for 'Science and Feminism' in the Encyclopaedia of Archaeological Sciences.

== Career ==
Bickle graduated from the University of Sheffield with a degree in Archaeology in 2002. She worked in commercial archaeology before moving to Cardiff University to study for her MA, graduating in 2004. She studied for a PhD examining at Neolithic architecture in northern France, entitled "Life and death of the longhouse: Daily life during and after the early Neolithic in the river valleys of the Paris Basin", which was awarded in 2009. Post-doctoral projects included: Linearbandkeramik (LBK) culture in Europe, as part of a research team at the Universities of Bristol, Oxford and Durham; then at the University of Cardiff on The Times of Their Lives, which used Bayesian statistical analysis to create more precise chronologies for the Neolithic.

Bickle was appointed Lecturer in Archaeology at the University of York in 2014, was promoted to Senior Lecturer in 2019, and was named Professor in 2024.
