= Rex Repass =

- Born: Rex L. Repass; Charleston, West Virginia, U.S.
- Occupations: Public opinion researcher; marketing research executive; consultant
- Years active: 1980s–present
- Employers: Research America Inc.; MarketVision Research; R.L. Repass & Partners
- Organization: American Association for Public Opinion Research
- Known for: Founder of The West Virginia Poll; Young Thundering Herd player (1970s); President of Research America Inc.
- Awards: Marshall University JMC Hall of Fame (1994); Marshall University Distinguished Alumnus (2017)

Rex L. Repass is a US-based public opinion and marketing research executive. He is formerly the president of Research America. Research America Inc. acquired R.L. Repass & Partners, Inc. in 2016.

== Biography ==
Repass is a native of Charleston, West Virginia and a 1976 graduate of Marshall University in Huntington, West Virginia. He was a member of the Young Thundering Herd football team in the early 1970s following the plane crash of Southern Airways Flight 932. In 1977, Repass received a Master of Science degree in communications from the University of Tennessee-Knoxville, with a special emphasis in public opinion and advertising research.

In 1980, Repass developed The West Virginia Poll for the Charleston Daily Mail, WSAZ Television and the Associated Press. The West Virginia Poll was the first media sponsored scientific measurement of public opinion in West Virginia. The West Virginia Poll is sponsored by the MetroNews Radio Network.

In 1988, Repass moved his research practice from Charleston, West Virginia to MarketVision Research Inc. in Cincinnati, Ohio where he was president of the organization. In 2001, he sold his interest in MarketVision and formed what became R.L. Repass & Partners Inc.

Repass is a member of the American Association for Public Opinion Research.

== See also ==
- Quantitative marketing research
- Qualitative marketing research
- Brand Equity
- Advertising Research
- Observational techniques
- Online research communities
