= John Bickley (Stafford MP) =

English politician

John Bickley was Member of the Parliament of England for Stafford in 1529.
