= Antoinette Rodez Schiesler =

American educator and former nun

Mary Antoinette Rodez Schiesler
- Born: Carole Virginia Rodez; December 13, 1934; Chicago, Illinois, U.S.
- Died: April 8, 1996 (aged 61)
- Education: College of Notre Dame of Maryland (B.A.); University of Tennessee, Knoxville (M.S. in Chemistry); University of Maryland, College Park (1977, Ph.D.)
- Spouse: Robert Alan Schiesler (m. 1973)
- Scientific career
- Fields: Chemistry
- Workplaces: Bowie State College; Oak Ridge National Laboratory; University of Maryland, College Park; Eastern Michigan University; Villanova University; Cabrini College
- Thesis: Locus-of-Control and Academic Achievement in Remedial Chemistry (1977)

Mary Antoinette Rodez Schiesler (December 13, 1934 – April 8, 1996; née Carole Virginia Rodez) was an American chemist and director of research at Villanova University. She was also a former Roman Catholic nun and Episcopal deaconess.

== Early life ==
Carole Virginia Rodez was born in Chicago, Illinois. Her mother, Gladyce (Cunningham) Rodez, was a singer from New Haven, Connecticut, who had moved to Chicago to search for work with the big bands. There, at the age of 26, she was raped by a "Cuban man named Rodriguez", and became pregnant. Gladyce raised her daughter as a single mother, choosing to move back to familiar New Haven rather than raise her daughter in a strange city, despite knowing that she would be shame and excluded from her family for having a child out of wedlock. Carole only discovered her history when she was in her mid-thirties.

Carole described her mother as having a "terrible, terrible temper", but explained that "when she could manage it, gave her all." Sara Lawrence-Lightfoot, in her book I've Known Rivers: Lives of Loss and Liberation, writes: "Toni remembers sitting on her grandmother's knees by the radio listening to her mother sing, loving the mellow, soothing voice. She aches in knowing that her mother had wonderful talents but was unable to make it as a musician 'because of the circumstances'." Carole knew that her mother considered her to be gifted and tried to nurture her talents, but that she had not wanted to have children.

Carole's early life was tumultuous. Her relatives treated Gladyce like "sort of an outcast". Her mother did domestic work but often struggled to find jobs, so Carole was sometimes left with acquaintances while her mother worked out of state. When Carole was seven years old, Gladyce married a cook named Lafayette, whom Carole described as "the meanest man I'd ever known". Carole travelled down to Florida for the wedding, and stayed there for a year with Lafayette's sister Betty. She then returned to New Haven to live with her mother and Lafayette in the projects. Lafayette was cruel and abusive, and Gladyce eventually sent him away.

A bright child, she learned to read by reading advertisements on the bus, dismantled her toys to understand how they worked, and performed chemistry experiments with a set she was given for her birthday. In New Haven, she attended public school, and was so far ahead of her peers that her teachers suggested she skip fifth grade. When Carole was twelve, Gladyce enrolled her as a boarder at St. Frances Academy, in order to provide her with a stable life and a proper education. St. Frances Academy was a Catholic girls' school for "colored girls" grades eight to twelve, run by the Oblate Sisters of Providence. It was the first school for black children in the city, run by free black Roman Catholic nuns of mainly of Haitian descent: "disciplined, proud impeccable black nuns".

According to Lawrence-Lightfoot, Carole "was 'terrified' of being taken to a convent, terrified of the isolation, the mystery, the shroud of secrecy." However, Carole explains that she "ended up loving the place" and in particular the rules, the discipline and the righteousness of the academy. Lawrence-Lightfoot writes: "For the child whose real mother was in Philadelphia 'floating around someplace' looking for work, St. Frances, with so many motherly holy women, must have felt like heaven. [Carole] seized the opportunity to be mothered and worked diligently and earnestly to be the perfect child."

Carole's poverty was a constant source of anguish, since the other girls at school were predominantly middle-class: "I always felt inferior because I always felt poor". Lawrence-Lightfoot explains that she was lonely and shy, keeping herself apart from her peers "because of a constant worry that they would exclude and humiliate her". In an attempt to overcome her shyness, Carole taught herself the guitar, and used it as an icebreaker.

Her summers away from the academy were particularly chaotic. In the summer after ninth grade, her mother Gladyce had been fired, so the pair were homeless and destitute, sleeping rough and wandering the streets during the day in search of work and lodgings. They stayed for several months in a hotel run by Father Divine, a religious figure with a cult-like following, while her mother looked for work. Carole was devastated to learn that they did not have the money to pay the tuition at St. Frances, and that she would have to go to the local school, West Philadelphia School. She wrote to the sisters at St Frances about her grief at not being able to return, and after six weeks they wrote back to offer her a scholarship, on the condition that she work two jobs to earn her keep. "Within twenty-four hours, she was on the bus heading south to St. Frances," Lawrence-Lightfoot writes.

She was an excellent student, and graduated high school top of her class. She studied chemistry as a senior, where she excelled, sometimes even running the lab and teaching other students when the teacher was absent. She explained: "I was looking for answers as an adolescent, and chemistry provided them. I was extremely scrupulous."

When Carole joined St. Frances Academy, she was an Episcopalian. However, she was drawn to the nuns, and within months, Carole had decided that she also wanted to be a nun. She converted to Catholicism after the tenth grade, and was baptised on December 7, 1950. She applied to join the convent, although she decided to hedge her bets by also applying to the air force.

On September 8, 1952, at the age of seventeen, she entered the Convent of the Immaculate Conception. At the convent, she followed a daily schedule full of hard manual labour, hours of prayer and imposed silence, but she relished this routine and the structure it provided: "The regularity was wonderful. It gave me the security I always craved.". She was given the name of Mary Antoinette when she became a novice on March 9, 1953, and kept the name for the rest of her life.

== Career and education ==
Mary Antoinette Schiesler did her teacher training at the Oblate Institute (later the Mount Providence Junior College). She began working as a teacher at the St. Augustine elementary school in Washington, D.C. She hated her time there because she had never been taught how to keep control of a class, and was bullied and humiliated by the institution's mother superior. She went so far as to petition the mother superior at St Frances to be allowed to return to the convent, but was denied. She transferred to St. Joseph's School in Alexandria, Virginia, after a year, where she taught for four years, then returned to the Mother House for a year of hard labour and prayer before taking her final vows on August 15, 1960. Lawrence-Lightfoot writes that "The grueling physical labor of the convent felt light in comparison to the demands of the students." Her third teaching mission was at Saint Cecilia's in Baltimore, where she was able to pass on her passion for math and science to older students.

Schiesler would have liked to study at university full time. Instead, she studied for her undergraduate degree in chemistry while working as a teacher, attending college classes on Saturdays and enrolling full time during the summer. She earned her BA in 1967 from the College of Notre Dame of Maryland.

Even though she was only an elementary school teacher, Schiesler secretly applied for a highly selective graduate program for junior-college teachers of math and science, sponsored by the National Labs in Oak Ridge, Tennessee. The program would involve a full year of scientific immersion followed by a summer of thesis writing for a Master of Science degree. Schiesler was one of only twenty students accepted into the program, and the only African American student. She convinced her mother superior to let her attend, and was given permission, despite the mother superior's fear that if she were allowed to leave she would not return.

Her schedule at Oak Ridge was so exhausting that she was allowed to live in an apartment rather than at the convent; this was the first time she lived on her own. Schiesler had never been taught any physics, so she taught herself some of the curriculum's prerequisites in order to understand her nuclear physics classes. She had also never studied biochemistry, but her advisor at Oak Ridge was a biochemist. He assigned her a piece of his research as a thesis topic, working on the effect of radioactivity on enzymes. Through mostly independent study, she earned a master's degree in chemistry in 1969 from the University of Tennessee, Knoxville, with a thesis titled "The Inactivation of Pancreatic Lipase by Gamma Radiation".

Schiesler returned to the convent, working as a math teacher for a year, then as the academic dean, registrar, housemother, and physical science teacher. Her new routine and structure was "claustrophobic". Schiesler was undecided about her life, and began looking for ways to take time away from the community. She consulted with a clinical psychologist who advised her that her indecision was the source of her anxiety. In 1971, at the age of thirty-seven and after nineteen years as a nun, she left the religious order to pursue a career in chemistry.

Schiesler taught at Bowie State College, before she returned to graduate school to earn a PhD in chemical education at University of Maryland, College Park. For a time, she worked as a lecturer and lab coordinator for the University of Maryland, and rewrote the math and science workbooks because "they were not good".

Throughout her career, Schiesler held positions with the Maryland State Board of Higher Education, as a program manager at the National Science Foundation, and as director of research at Eastern Michigan University, before becoming director of research at Villanova University. Her last position before her retirement from academic life in 1993 was as dean of academic affairs at Cabrini College in Radnor, Pennsylvania. She described the life of an administrator as hectic, demanding and eclectic.

Schiesler was ordained as an Episcopal deacon in 1994, and wanted her ministry to be different from her husband's, who was also an Episcopal priest. She served as associate to the dean at the Cathedral of St. John in Wilmington, Delaware, until her death. She also served on the executive board of the Episcopal Women's Caucus, and on the executive council of the Episcopal Diocese of Delaware.

== Personal life and beliefs ==
Schiesler had a sister, Arvella, two years younger (to the day) than her, a fact she herself only discovered when she was in her twenties. Her mother had felt unable to take care of two children and had given the child up for adoption to a family in New York City. She later managed to reunite with her sister.

In her book I've Known Rivers: Lives of Loss and Liberation (1994), Sara Lawrence-Lightfoot describes her first meeting with Schiesler: "Toni does not fit my fantasy of what a former nun would look like. She is exuberant in her style and carriage. Tall and lean, she is wearing purple from head to toe: purple stockings, a purple leather purse, a purple silk blouse, a large purple scarf over her white coat, and even purple eye shadow behind her large modern glasses. She is medium-brown-skinned with chiseled features, large expressive eyes, and a halo of white hair."

During her time as a nun, Schiesler describes several "particular friendships", including one with her colleague at St. Joseph's School, Sister Esther. Lawrence-Lightfoot writes: "They not only helped each other with teaching and schoolwork; they also became each other's favourite companion and confidante. The trust and respect turned into a deepening love, a love that often got expressed physically." She explains that "despite the official regulations against particular friendships and the harsh admonitions from superiors, there was a lively underground of these illicit love affairs, and everyone knew of their existence. The friendships brought joy and comfort as well as surreptitiousness and guilt." Schiesler fell in love with Father Joseph Walker, a Josephite priest, after completing her master's degree at Oak Ridge. The relationship lasted several years on and off. She explains: "I was in love with this guy... and he was in love with me... but from the beginning, he was clear and emphatic that he was going to be a priest forever... that he would never leave religious life." She later met Hugh Tornabene, an English physicist, shortly before she left the religious order. He was a Jesuit who had recently left the priesthood, and it was he who encouraged her to teach with him at the Bowie State Teachers College.

Mary Antoinette Rodez met Robert Alan "Bob" Schiesler (b. 1949) soon after she quit religious life. He was a former Roman Catholic seminarian who had left the seminary and taught school for a while before becoming an Episcopal priest. They were married on October 20, 1973. They were a controversial couple for their time, since he was a white man, fourteen years her junior (at the time, some states still outlawed interracial marriage), but Schiesler described him as "perfect for me". According to Lawrence-Lightfoot, Schiesler described the marriage as "satisfying and rewarding, a marriage that [gave] her room to be herself and pursue her interests." Schiesler resisted the pressure to become a clergy spouse, since she was a professional and wanted to remain so. She saw herself as a "radical feminist type, although many do not see me that way."

Schiesler described her husband as "very understanding and supportive of anything I choose to do." However, her husband initially opposed her decision to leave academia to become an Episcopal priest, explaining that she was too old to start a new career (she was fifty-two at the time), and would have to take a major cut in salary. Schiesler eventually realised that his real fear was that this career change might create some competition between them, and that his wife might be better liked by their parishioners.

While at Cabrini College, Schiesler started a woman's spirituality group which met once a week to "discover the spirit". She wanted it to be a circle of equals with a broad definition of spirituality which included "taking care of yourself, growing up, understanding yourself, your talents and strengths... It includes being aware of how we deal with one another... determining the power we have and how we use it... It includes creating the time for prayer, exercise, mediation, reading".

Schiesler did not see any contradictions between her love of science and her love of religion. Rather, she believed that each reinforced and strengthened the other, stating: "The beauty of chemistry and astronomy say so much to be about the beauty and wonder of God... How could you take a chemistry course and not believe in God?... the order, the fitting together... all God's work. Chemistry is the microworld, disciplined and ordered, and astronomy is the macroworld, harmonious and ordered."

She died suddenly from a brain tumor in 1996, age 61.

== Legacy ==
Since 1996, there has been an M. Antoinette Schiesler Memorial scholarship at Cabrini University (a college until 2016), sponsored by her family, reserved for African-American or Hispanic-American women students in education.
