= Anna Maria Parry =

American fabric designer

- Born: 1972 (age 53–54)
- Education: University of Tennessee
- Known for: artist, author, fabric designer
- Website: annamariaparry.com

Anna Maria Parry (formerly Anna Maria Horner) is an artist, author and fabric designer in Nashville, Tennessee, known for her colorful fabric designs, quilts, and sewing patterns. In addition to teaching classes and selling items globally under her namesake brand, she has written several books about sewing, quilting, and needlework. Parry has appeared on The Martha Stewart Show and been featured in Better Homes and Gardens. In May 2015 she opened Craft South, a craft store and studio in Nashville.

Parry comes from a family of artists, including painters, weavers, and knitters, and learned to sew as a child. She later attended the University of Tennessee, where she earned a fine arts degree in drawing and was introduced to patchwork quilting. Parry founded a clothing and housewares boutique called Handmaiden in 1995. She continued to design clothes, paint and quilt. In 2001, Parry began work on her personal brand Anna Maria.

Formerly Anna Maria Horner, Parry changed her surname in 2023 on her second marriage. She has seven children with her first husband Jeff Horner; her eldest daughter, Juliana, is also a designer and works for her mother's brand.

This fabric design ("Honorable Mention" in the "Gold" colorway) shows Parry's characteristic use of color, geometry, and floral motifs.

== Work ==
Parry's fabric designs have been sold around the world. She is a designer for FreeSpirit Fabrics and serves as a curator for Anna Maria's Conservatory, collecting work by other fabric design artists. Parry is known for colorful designs that often feature geometric and floral motifs. As a quilter, Parry combines her knowledge of traditional handcraft with her fine arts degree knowledge to create new designs rooted in traditional handcraft techniques.

== Books by Anna Maria Parry ==
- Seams to Me: 24 New Reasons to Love Sewing (2008)
- Handmade Beginnings: 24 Sewing Projects to Welcome Baby (2010)
- Anna Maria's Needleworks Notebook (2012)
- Anna Maria's Blueprint Quilting (2024)
