= Sarah Webb (painter) =

American painter

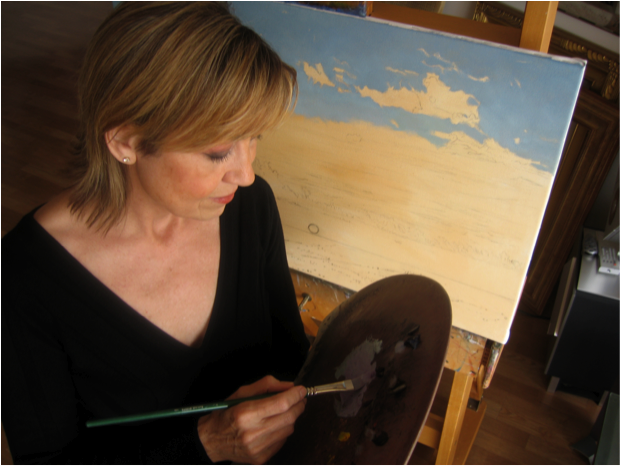
- Sarah Webb working on Chicago Sunset Series
- Born: February 1948 (age 78); Nashville, Tennessee
- Known for: First American inducted into British Society of Women Artists
- Parents: Samuel Stone Butler (father); Carolyn Horton (mother)

Sarah Webb is an American painter closely associated with Contemporary Realism. She is best known for her realist portrayal of contemporary European society and figurative studies of the modern woman.

== Early life and studies ==
Sarah Webb was born in February 1948 in Nashville, Tennessee, where she was the fourth of five children born to Samuel Stone Butler and Carolyn Horton. Webb developed an early interest in art and by the age of twelve was taking classes in general art and oil painting. Settling on a career in fine art, she received her formal art training at the University of Tennessee, earning a Bachelor of Arts degree with honors. Later she did post graduate work at Vanderbilt University.

In 1977, she took the first of many trips to the United Kingdom and Europe to continue her art studies on an independent basis. In addition to attending studio courses in figure painting, Webb followed the tried-and-true techniques of classical art training and copied works of the Old Masters at the Tate Gallery (1981) and the National Gallery (1983) in London, England.

== Career ==
Ladies Day at Royal Ascot (2005, oil on canvas)

In 1983 Webb moved her studio to London, where over the next twenty years she focused on capturing the transformation of contemporary London and Europe and her Blue Jean series of the modern woman in denim.

In 2004 she closed her London studio and relocated to Chicago, Illinois. This move resulted in an unexpected and unique series of Chicago Sunsets, viewed from her studio on the 57th floor just off of Michigan Avenue. By the end of the decade, Webb returned to her native Nashville and began working on The Big Splash, a series of women in water.

Although Webb is best known for her works in oils, she is also known for her black and white photography.

== Works ==
Webb’s paintings combine a strong emphasis on composition with a mastery of light and color in order to create realistic paintings that capture the diversity and spirit of the times and place. She has exhibited both nationally and internationally and having won numerous awards such as, Best of Show (1987) and Athena Award (1992) Annual Central South Art Competition (USA) and the winner at the American Artist National Art Competition at the Grand Central Gallery (N.Y. 1985), while being the first American to be inducted into the 158-year-old British Society of Women Artists. She has been the subject of profiles and reviews in print, public TV and radio. Her work is represented in the permanent collection of the Tennessee State Museum and numerous private and corporate collections in the United States, Canada, Europe, Dubai and the Far East.

== Additional References ==
- Hieronymus, Clara."Oh, How She Loves Paris," The Tennessean, December 27, 1987, Arts & Leisure, F-1.
- McNeilly, Caroline. "Artist Style Drawn From Masters," The Nashville Banner, March 12, 1981, Lifestyles, p. 1.
- Webb, Gary A. Sarah Webb: A Contemporary Realist Abroad. Artistic Legacy, LLC, 2022. ISBN 979-8-9857563-0-2.
- Who's Who in American Art ISBN 978-0-8379-6316-7.

== Film and Radio ==
- Elmore, Joe. "Profiling International Artist Sarah Webb in London, England". Tennessee Crossroads. WDCN-TV, Nashville. Aired on June 23, 1994.- IMDb
- "A Conversation with International Artist Sarah Webb." Coffee Break Show, WPLN-FM (Nashville). Aired on February 6, 1985.
