= Ron Bickley =

Australian rules footballer (1926–2020)

Personal information
- Full name: Ron Bickley
- Born: 21 October 1926
- Died: 11 October 2020 (aged 93)
- Original team: University Blacks
- Height: 171 cm (5 ft 7 in)
- Weight: 72 kg (159 lb)

Playing career^{1}
Years	Club	Games (Goals)
1949–51	Fitzroy	29 (0)
- ^{1} Playing statistics correct to the end of 1951.

Ron Bickley (21 October 1926 – 11 October 2020) was an Australian rules footballer who played with Fitzroy in the Victorian Football League (VFL).
