= Bickley baronets =

Extinct baronetcy in the Baronetage of England

The Bickley Baronetcy, of Attleborough in the County of Norfolk, was a title in the Baronetage of England. It was created on 3 September 1661 for Francis Bickley. The title became extinct on the death of the sixth baronet in 1773<Complete Baronetage v. III p. 230>

== Bickley baronets, of Attleborough (1661) ==
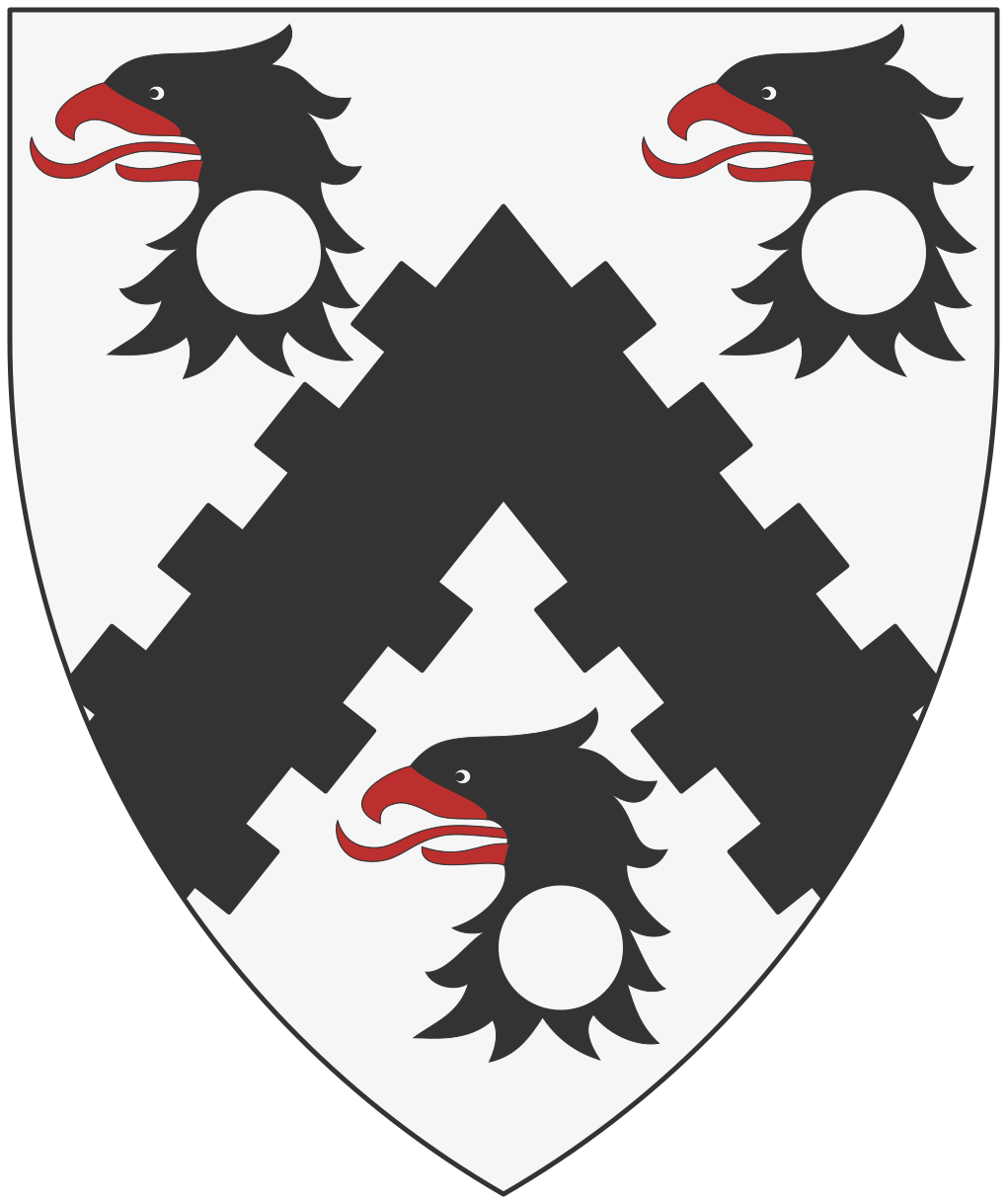
Arms of Bickley of Attleborough

- Sir Francis Bickley, 1st Baronet (c. 1582–1670)
- Sir Francis Bickley, 2nd Baronet (c. 1623–1681)
- Sir Francis Bickley, 3rd Baronet (1644–1687)
- Sir Francis Bickley, 4th Baronet (1667–1746)
- The Reverend Sir Humphrey Bickley, 5th Baronet (d. 1752 b. Attleborough 17 August 1752
- The Reverend Samuel Bickley, 6th Baronet.(1661-Jul 1773 Enfield, Middlesex, England)
