= William E. Bickley =

American entomologist

William Elbert Bickley (1914 - August 2, 2010) was an American entomologist.

== Biography ==
Bickley was born in Knoxville, Tennessee. He attended the University of Tennessee and earned a bachelor's degree in agriculture (1934). He attended the University of Maryland for graduate work in entomology, earning his master's degree in 1936 and his doctorate degree in 1940.

After graduating, Bickley worked for the University of Maryland Extension service as an entomologist (1940-1942). During World War II, Bickley served as a Captain in the U.S. Public Health Service. He then began work as an Assistant Professor of Biology at the University of Richmond (1947 to 1948).

Bickley was an entomologist and professor at the University of Maryland from 1949-1978. During his time working at University of Maryland, he also served as Head of the Entomology Department from 1957 to 1972.

Bickey was the president of the American Mosquito Control Association (1961-1962) and president of the Entomological Society of Washington (1963).

He volunteered at the Smithsonian Institution, and he later donated his entomological findings to the National Museum of Natural History.

== Works ==
He wrote 4 volumes:

- Description of The Pupa of Aedes
- The Anal Gills of Mosquito Larvae
- Notes on Distribution of Mosquitoes in Maryland and Virginia
- Separation of Variable Culex territans Specimens Cuiex (Neoculex) in North America from other

== Life ==
Bickley was married to Elizabeth Macgill Bickley for 56 years. He died while living at his daughter's home in Annapolis, Maryland in 2010.
