= Michael Bickle =

British geologist

Michael Bickle FRS
- Born: 26 February 1948 (age 78)
- Awards: Coke Medal, 2003, Murchison Medal, 2022
- Scientific career
- Fields: Geology
- Institutions: University of Cambridge
- Thesis: Studies of thrust sheets across the Matrei Zone in the Eastern Alps (1973)
- Doctoral advisor: Ron Oxburgh
- Website: www.esc.cam.ac.uk/directory/michael-bickle

Michael James Bickle FRS is a British geologist, and professor in the Department of Earth Sciences at the University of Cambridge. He was awarded the Coke Medal of the Geological Society in 2003, and the Murchison Medal of the Geological Society in 2022. Bickle was elected Fellow of the American Geophysical Union in 2002, and Fellow of the Royal Society in 2007.

His research combines fieldwork, geochemical analysis and physical modelling, including carbon capture and storage. Bickle is best known for his work in the 1980s with Dan McKenzie on the compositions of melts produced during mantle melting, and for his subsequent work on silicate weathering, the carbon cycle and geological storage of carbon.
