= Gene Wojciechowski =

American sportswriter

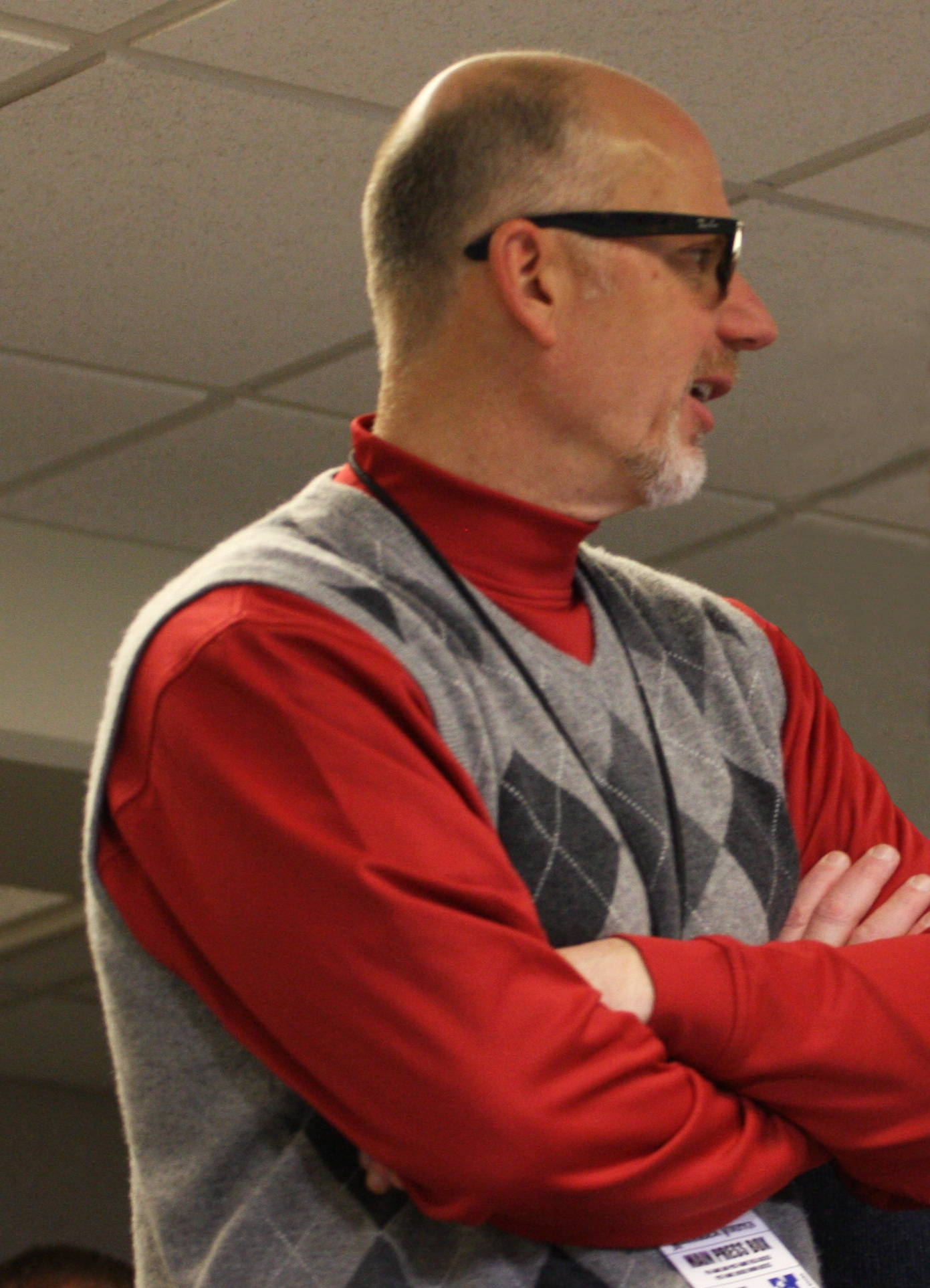
- Wojciechowski in 2010
- Education: University of Tennessee
- Occupations: Sports journalist, author

Gene Wojciechowski (/wɒtʃəˈhaʊski/) is an American sportswriter, best known for his time with ESPN, from 1998 to 2023.

== Early life ==
Born in Salina, Kansas, Wojciechowski received a bachelor's degree in communications and journalism from the University of Tennessee and began his career as a sports writer covering college football and college basketball. His work has included stints with the Chicago Tribune, Dallas Morning News, The Denver Post, and the Los Angeles Times; he became a senior writer for ESPN The Magazine in January 1998, having worked as a football reporter for the network since 1992. He was named a senior national sports columnist for ESPN in June 2005.

== Career ==
Prior to joining ESPN, Wojciechowski was the national college football and college basketball columnist for the Chicago Tribune (1996–97). He also reported on the NFL for both The Denver Post (1983–1984) and The Dallas Morning News (1984–1987) before switching to back to college football and basketball for the Los Angeles Times (1987–1996). Wojciechowski authored a novel, About 80 Percent Luck, plus a non-fiction book, Cubs Nation: 162 Games. 162 Stories. 1 Addiction (Broadway Books), following the Cubs for a full season.

Wojciechowski has also co-authored autobiographies with several sports personalities. These works include The Bus: My Life In and Out of a Helmet (Doubleday 2007) with Jerome Bettis; I Love Being the Enemy: A Season on the Court with the NBA’s Best Shooter and Sharpest Tongue (Simon & Schuster 1995) with Reggie Miller; Nothing but Net: Just Give Me the Ball and Get Out of the Way (Hyperion Books 1995) with Bill Walton; and My Life on a Napkin: Pillow Mints, Playground Dreams and Coaching the Runnin’ Utes (Hyperion 1999) with Rick Majerus.

The Last Great Game: Duke vs. Kentucky, and the 2.1 Seconds That Changed Basketball by Wojciechowski was released by Blue Rider Press in 2012. He is also the author/co-author of nine books.

On July 3, 2023, Wojciechowski was laid off by ESPN.

== Controversies ==
While he has won numerous peer awards, Wojciechowski wrote an article in the fall of 1997 for the Chicago Tribune that included negative stereotypes of an Indian or Pakistani cab driver, prompting the Tribune to offer a formal apology. At the time, he was the paper's national college football and college basketball columnist.
